= St John's, Monmouth =

Grade II listed building in Monmouth, Wales

St John's
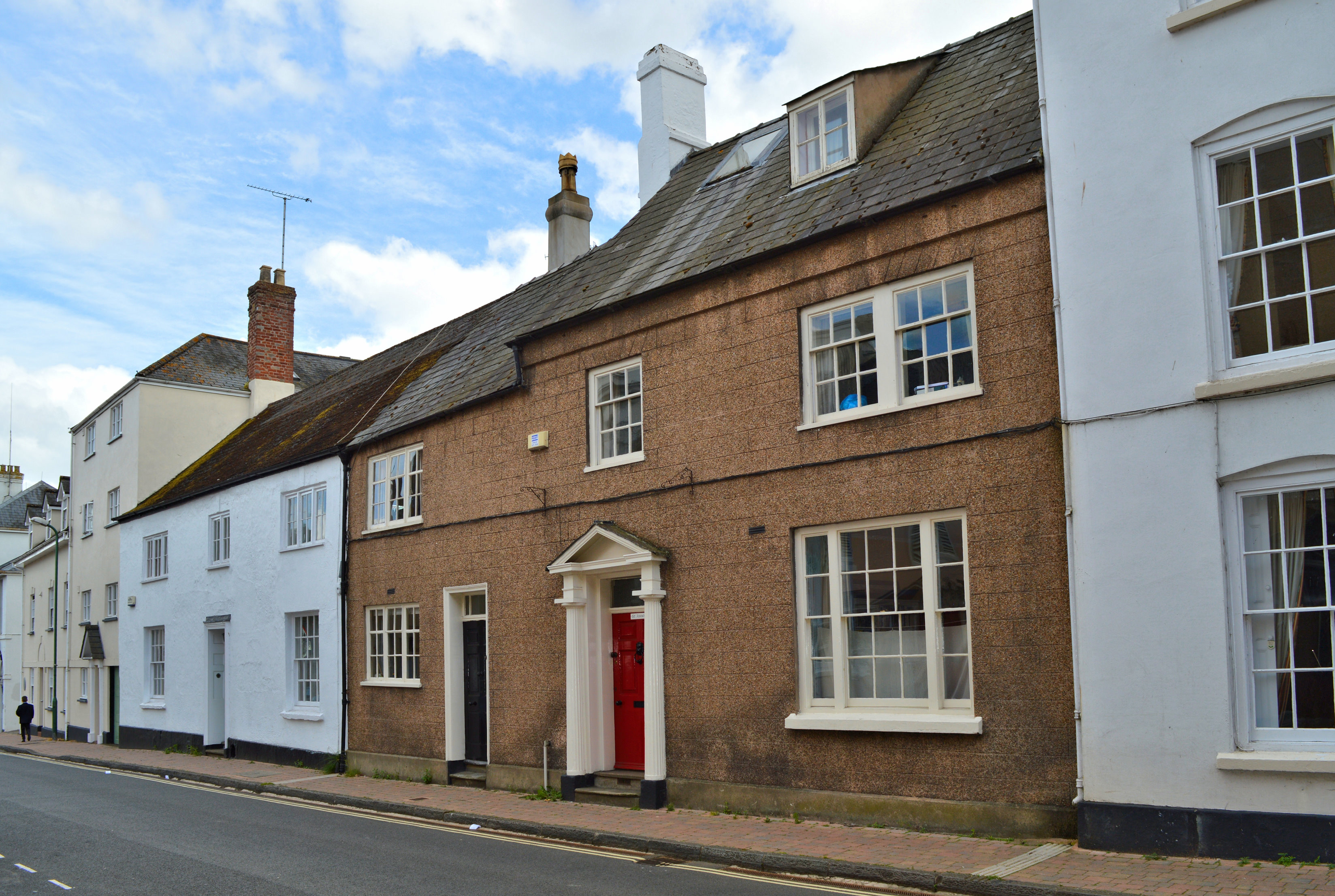
- St John's in 2017
- Interactive map of the St John's area

General information
- Location: 11 Glendower Street, Monmouth, Wales
- Coordinates: 51.811074°N 2.714656°W

Design and construction
- Designations: Grade II listed building / Cadw/ICOMOS Register of Parks and Gardens of Special Historic Interest in Wales

St John's is a grade II listed building in the town centre of Monmouth, Wales. It is located in Glendower Street within the medieval town walls. The house is most remarkable for the rear of the property which features a Coalbrookdale verandah and formal walled garden that have been separately grade II listed with the Cadw/ICOMOS Register of Parks and Gardens of Special Historic Interest in Wales. The villa's garden is also registered with the Welsh Historic Gardens Trust.

== History ==
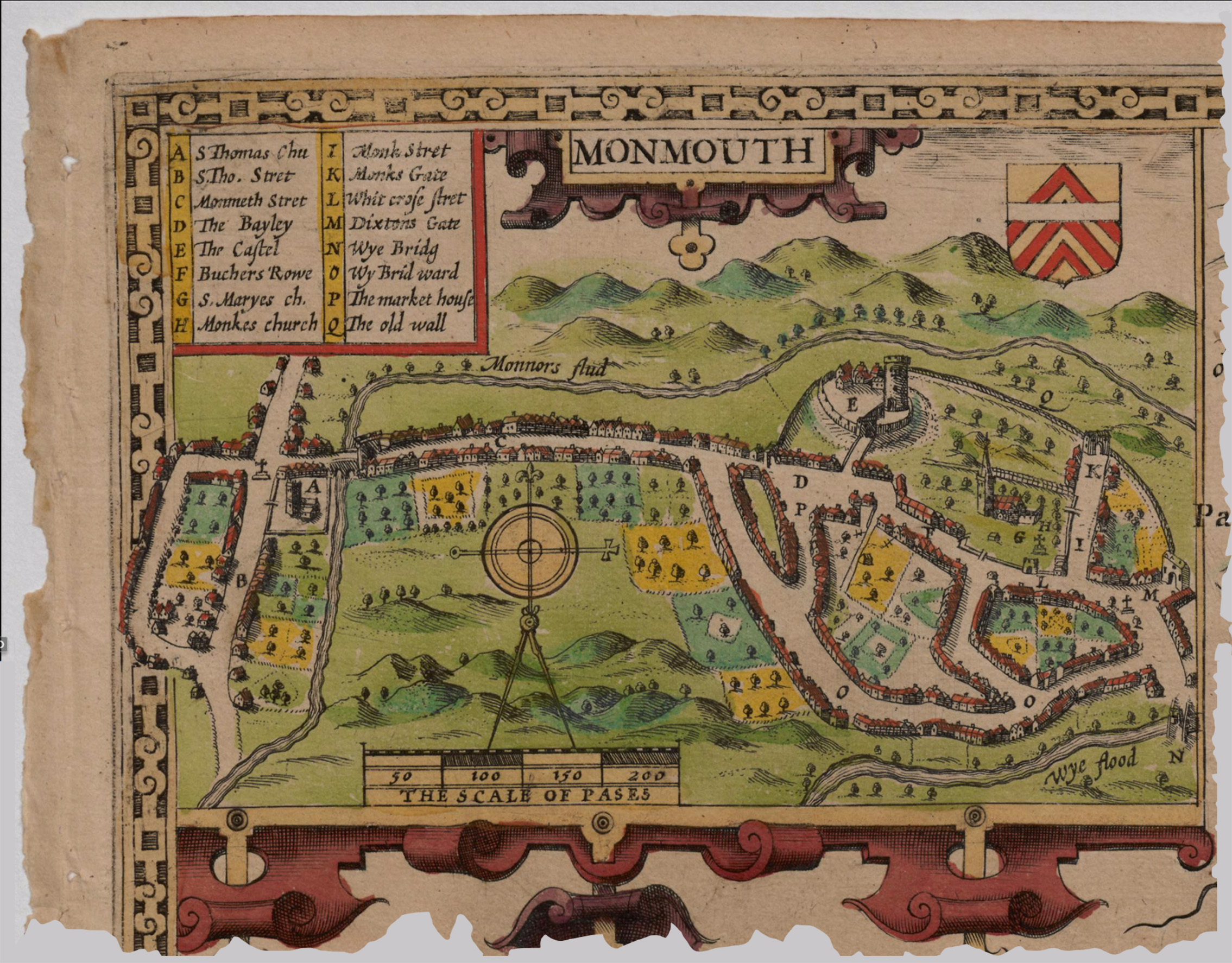
1610 map of Monmouth by John Speed

St John's (pictured) at 11 Glendower Street has been described as "one of Monmouth's best-kept secrets." It is an 18th-century, grade II listed building. St John's derived its name from a mistaken assertion by the antiquarian and bookseller Charles Heath at the turn of the 19th century. He had claimed that a monastery of St John was once located on the site. St John's is located on the south side of Glendower Street, within the medieval walls of Monmouth that were built around 1300 and are shown on Speed's map of the town (pictured).

In the mid-19th century, St John's was the residence of a physician. In 1891 a school operated at the house. The property is included on the 1901 Second Edition Ordnance Survey map of Monmouthshire. Details of the garden depicted on the map include a conservatory, kitchen garden, and tennis court.

The house has a two-storey, somewhat unimposing, street elevation and a three-storey rear elevation. The three-bay street elevation has a pedimented entrance flanked by fluted columns. There is a roughcast exterior and a slate roof.

The rear of the property is remarkable for the mid 19th-century, cast iron, Coalbrookdale verandah which runs the length of the rear elevation. There is a 19th-century, formal, walled garden between the villa and Chippenham Park to the south. High brick walls are present on the east and west sides of the garden. The south end of the garden is wider than that closer to the house, with a low stone wall and a gate that gives access Chippenham Park. Lawn has replaced the early 20th-century tennis court. The site of the former kitchen garden, east of the formal garden, was sold in the 1920s and has been redeveloped.

The house was grade II listed on 9 April 1973. Later, the garden, including the verandah, was grade II listed, and registered by 1994 with the Cadw/ICOMOS Register of Parks and Gardens of Special Historic Interest in Wales, ICOMOS a reference to the International Council on Monuments and Sites. The garden is registered with the Welsh Historic Gardens Trust.

== See also ==
Glendower Street, Monmouth
