= Glendower =

Glendower may refer to:

== Places in South Africa ==
- Glendower Golf Club, golf complex in Edenvale, South Africa

== Places in the United Kingdom ==
- Glendower House, Monmouth, historic house in Monmouth, Wales
- Glendower Preparatory School, preparatory school in London
- Glendower Street, Monmouth, historic street in Monmouth, Wales

== Places in the United States ==
- Glendower State Memorial, a historic house in Lebanon, Ohio
- Shandon, Ohio, which was originally called Glendower
- Glendower, Virginia

== Other meanings ==
- Glendower as featured in The Raven Cycle

== See also ==
- Owen Glendower (disambiguation)
- Glyndŵr (disambiguation)
