= Nelson Rooms, Monmouth =

Grade II listed building in Monmouth, Monmouthshire, Wales

The Nelson Rooms, Monmouth
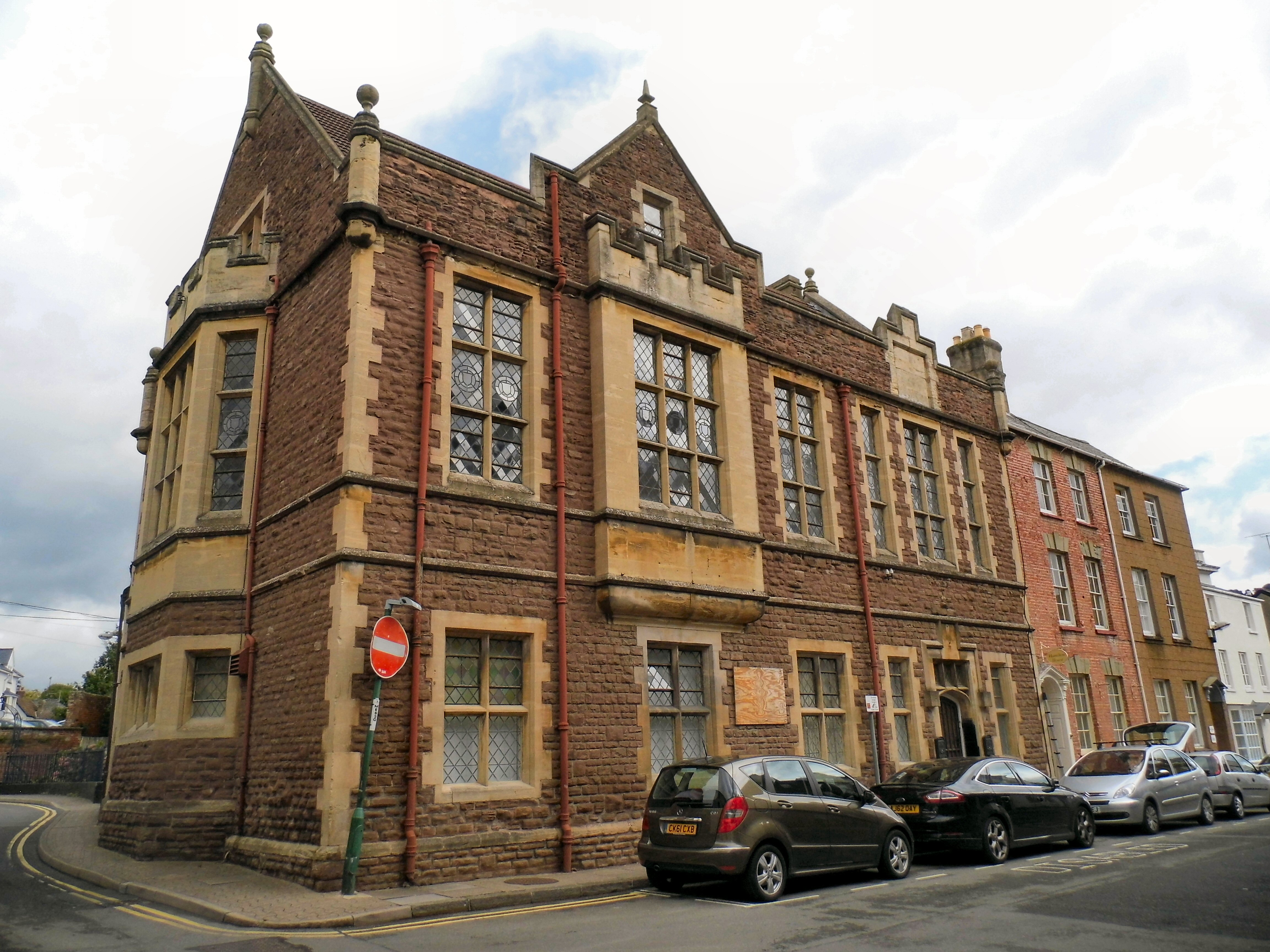
- Interactive map of the The Nelson Rooms, Monmouth area
- Alternative names: Working Men's Gymnasium; The Nelson Museum

General information
- Location: 2 Glendower Street, Monmouth, Wales
- Coordinates: 51.8113°N 2.7150°W

Design and construction
- Architect: Benjamin Lawrence
- Designations: Grade II Listed

The Nelson Rooms is a grade II listed building in Monmouth, Monmouthshire, Wales. It is in the historic Glendower Street and Agincourt Street neighbourhood, within the medieval town walls. The building initially served as a gymnasium and was a gift from Lady Llangattock to the town of Monmouth. In 1924, after the benefactor's death, it reopened as the Nelson Museum, and showcased the collection of memorabilia related to Admiral Horatio Nelson that had been amassed by the baroness. The Nelson Museum moved to new quarters at the Market Hall in 1969. The former gymnasium and museum is now an apartment building.

== History ==
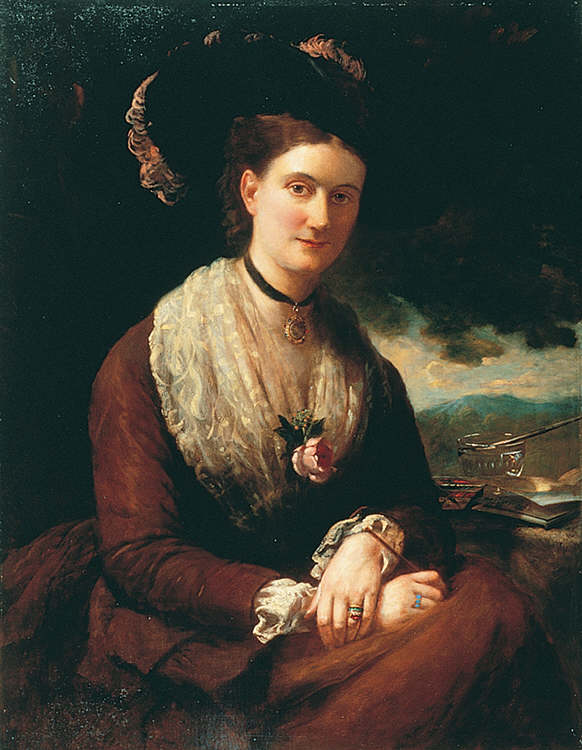
Portrait of Lady Llangattock by H. Groves

The Nelson Rooms at 2 Glendower Street in Monmouth is a 19th-century, grade II listed building. It is located at the corner of Glendower Street and Agincourt Street, within the medieval town walls. The street on which it is situated was referred to as Grinders Street in the medieval period. The building was constructed in the late 19th century and has undergone little alteration of its exterior in the interim. It was built by Lady Llangattock (1837–1923) as the Working Men's Gymnasium.

Lady Llangatock, née Georgiana Marcia Maclean, was the wife of John Allan Rolls, 1st Baron Llangattock (1837–1912). Lord and Lady Llangattock were the parents of four children, including their youngest son Charles Stewart Rolls (1877–1910). Their son Charles co-founded Rolls-Royce Limited and was an aviation enthusiast. In 1910, he became the first Englishman to die in an aviation accident when his Wright biplane crashed at Bournemouth. Lady Llangattock lost her husband and all three of her sons in a six-year period. Lord Llangattock died in October 1912, and their two surviving sons, John Maclean Rolls and Henry Allan Rolls, both died in 1916 during World War I.

Georgiana Rolls donated the Working Men's Gymnasium to the town of Monmouth in the late 19th century. In 1901, Kelly's Directory of Monmouthshire referred to the gym on Glendower Street as the Monmouth Gymnasium and revealed that it was staffed by John B. Hyam and Ernest William Hyam. The former, with the title Honorable Secretary, presumably was the John Benjamin Hyam who appeared on the same record as a manufacturer and merchant at Hyam's Mineral Water Works. While the connection of Horatio Nelson, 1st Viscount Nelson to Monmouth was somewhat tenuous, Georgiana, Lady Llangatock, became an avid collector of memorabilia related to the admiral. The Nelson Collection was a bequest to Monmouth from Lady Llangattock upon her death in 1923.

The Nelson Museum was established at the former Monmouth Gymnasium in 1924 and the collection amassed by Lady Llangattock formed the core of its offerings. One of the most renowned items in the museum's collection is the set of leather-bound volumes containing the letters of Horatio Nelson to his spouse, one of them holding the wedding ring of Lady Nelson. In 1934, the Misses F. and G. Thomas were the museum curators. The Nelson Museum moved from the former gymnasium on Glendower Street to its present quarters at the Market Hall on Priory Street in 1969, six years after a fire that had ravaged the Market Hall. In addition to the admiral's relics, the Monmouth Museum's collection includes information about Lady Llangattock's famed son Charles Stewart Rolls. After the museum's transfer to Priory Street, the history collections for Monmouth were included in the exhibits. Accordingly, the Monmouth Museum is also referred to as the Nelson Museum and Local History Centre.

== Design ==
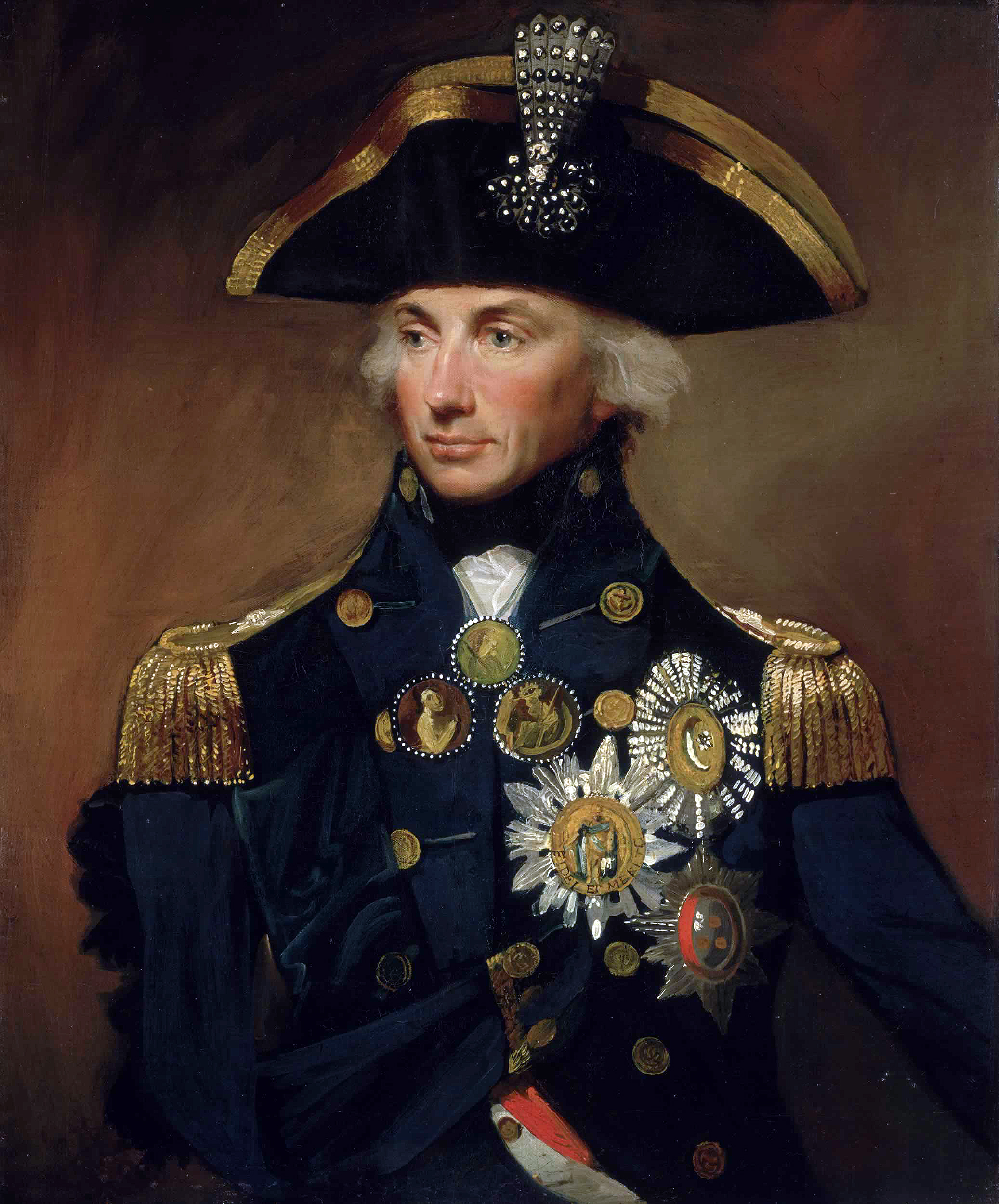
Horatio Nelson, 1st Viscount Nelson

The building at Glendower Street is thought to have been the design of Benjamin Lawrence, a Newport architect who designed the Working Men's Free Institute at 1 Monk Street for Lady Llangattock as well. Lawrence was also the architect of the Monmouth Baptist Church on Monk Street. The building derives its current name, The Nelson Rooms, from the Nelson Museum which was housed there before the museum's move in 1969. It was grade II listed on 8 October 2005.

During the interval since the move of the museum, the building served for a time as an auction venue, and more recently has been converted to residential apartments. In February 2006, an application was submitted to the Monmouthshire County Council, requesting permission to convert the listed building to three flats; approval was granted the following August. In April 2008, another application was submitted to the Monmouthshire County Council, requesting that further renovation of the Glendower Street building be permitted for its continued use as apartments; the modifications were approved the following June.

The building is situated with one elevation along Glendower Street and its gable end facing Agincourt Street. The 19th-century, two storey building has a first floor which is of substantially greater height than the ground floor. It is constructed of red sandstone rubble, and has contrasting Bath Stone quoins and trim. The Glendower Street elevation features an oriel window with a castellated parapet and stone apron. The Agincourt Street facade features a canted bay and another window with castellated parapet and apron. Three band courses run the length of the circumference of the building.

== See also ==
- Monmouth Museum
- Lady Llangattock
- Horatio Nelson, 1st Viscount Nelson
