= MOSP =

MOSP may refer to:

- Mathematical Olympiad Summer Program, at Carnegie Mellon University, US
- PTPMT1 or MOSP, a protein
- DUSP23 or MOSP, an enzyme
- Monmouth Off Street Project, of the Gwent Police; See Monmouth Police Station
