= Monmouth Museum =

Museum in Monmouth, Wales

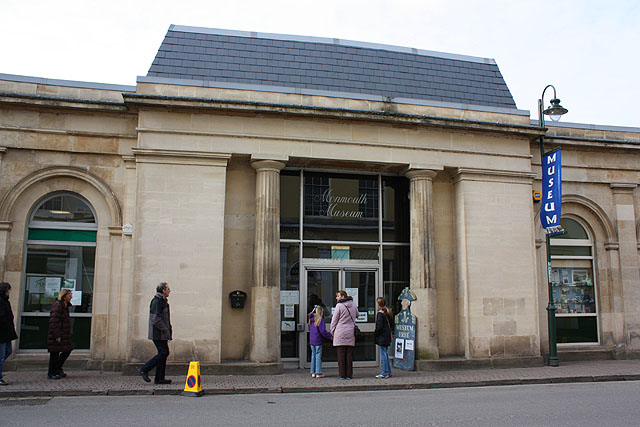
- Dissolved: 2022
- Location: Market Hall, Monmouth, Wales
- Coordinates: 51.8131°N 2.7156°W

The Monmouth Museum, previously known as The Nelson Museum and Local History Centre, was a museum in Monmouth, Monmouthshire, south east Wales. It featured a collection of artefacts associated with Admiral Horatio Nelson, and a local history collection. The museum was located in the Market Hall in the town centre. It was closed during the COVID-19 pandemic in the United Kingdom and did not re-open thereafter. In 2021 Monmouthshire County Council announced plans to move the museum collection to the Shire Hall in Agincourt Square. The five-year project, supported by the National Lottery Heritage Fund, will see a new museum open at the Shire Hall by 2027. The Market Hall site will be let as commercial premises.

== History ==
=== Collections ===
The Nelson collection was a bequest to the town of Monmouth on the death of Lady Georgiana Llangattock in 1923. Lady Llangattock, wife of the local landowner and town benefactor, John Rolls, 1st Baron Llangattock, and mother of Charles Rolls, had amassed a collection of Admiral Horatio Nelson memorabilia during the late nineteenth and early twentieth centuries.

The collection includes Nelson's naval officers fighting sword (and those of the surrendered French and Spanish naval commanders at Trafalgar); letters from Nelson both to his wife and to Lady Hamilton; and various items commemorating Nelson's victories, his Royal Navy career and his visit with the Hamiltons to Monmouth town, The Kymin, and South Wales. Also on display are commemorative silverware, prints, paintings, glassware, pottery and models of the Battle of Trafalgar. Among the items from Nelson's visit is the table used when he dined at the Kymin Round House.

The collection also comprises some Nelson fakes, including a glass eye purported to be his, even though he had lost his sight, not the eyeball itself; it is a surgeon's teaching model. The museum also holds items relating to Monmouth town's history and archaeology, and an archive relating to Charles Rolls and his family. One notable example of this is the only known example of an original Monmouth Cap, dating from the 16th century.

=== Sites ===
The museum has been located at three separate sites within the town. In 1891 Lady Llangattock established a gymnasium in Glendower Street. The building was a gift to the town to mark the coming of age of John Maclean Rolls. After Lady Llangattock's death in 1923, the gymnasium reopened as the Nelson Museum in 1924. When the museum moved to new premises in 1969, the Glendower Street site was renamed the Nelson Rooms.

In 1969 the museum moved to a new location in the Market Hall on Priory Street. Following a major fire in 1963 which destroyed the upper floor and cupola of the Market Hall, the site was refurbished and redesigned. The museum re-opened at the Market Hall and was termed The Nelson Museum and Local History Centre.

In June 2021, while the museum was closed during the COVID-19 pandemic in the United Kingdom, Monmouthshire County Council announced that the museum would not reopen in its Market Hall location and that the collections would be relocated to the Shire Hall in Agincourt Square. The five-year project, supported by the National Lottery Heritage Fund, will see a new museum open at the Shire Hall by 2027. The Market Hall site will be let as commercial premises.

== Museum Collection ==
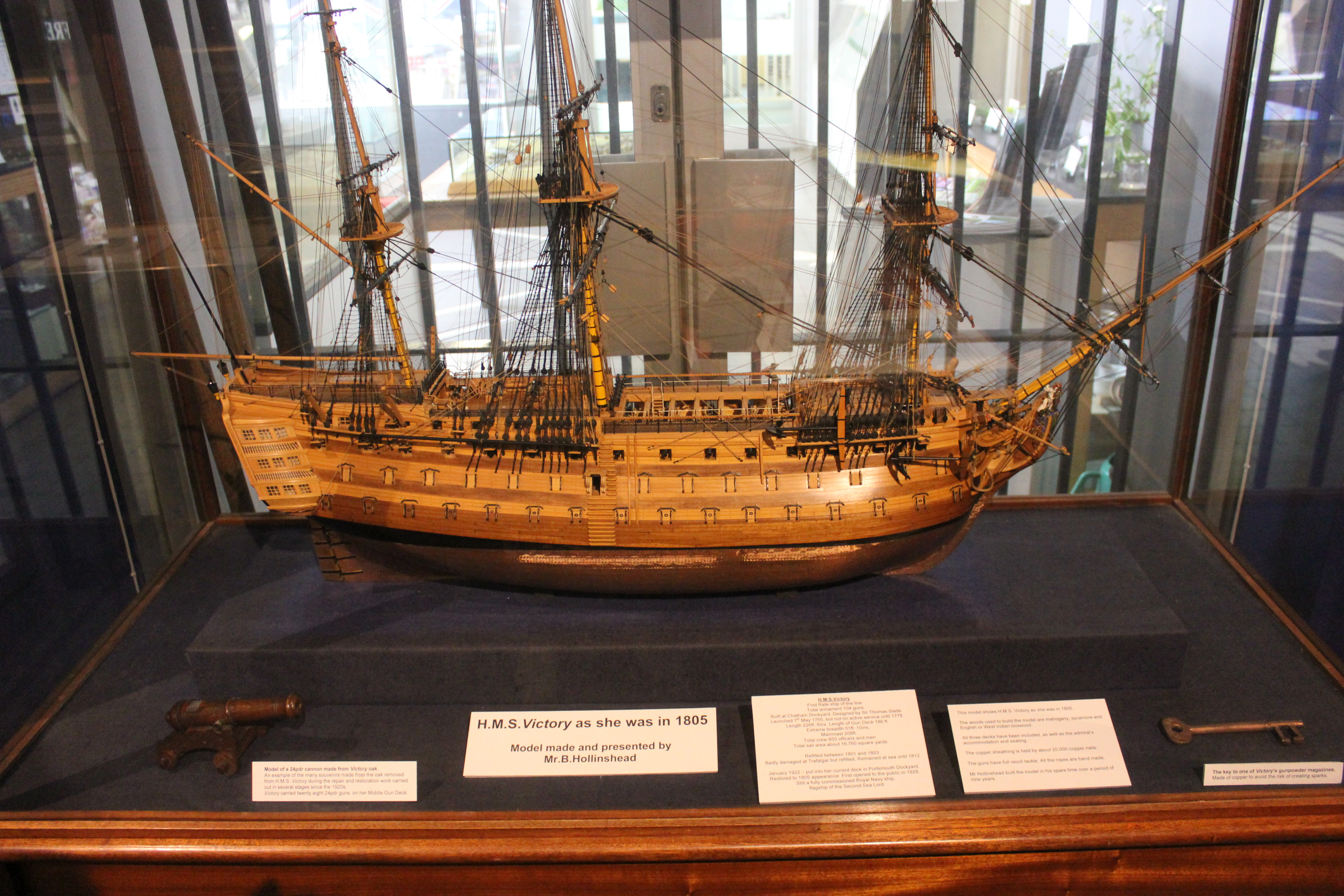
A model of HMS Victory

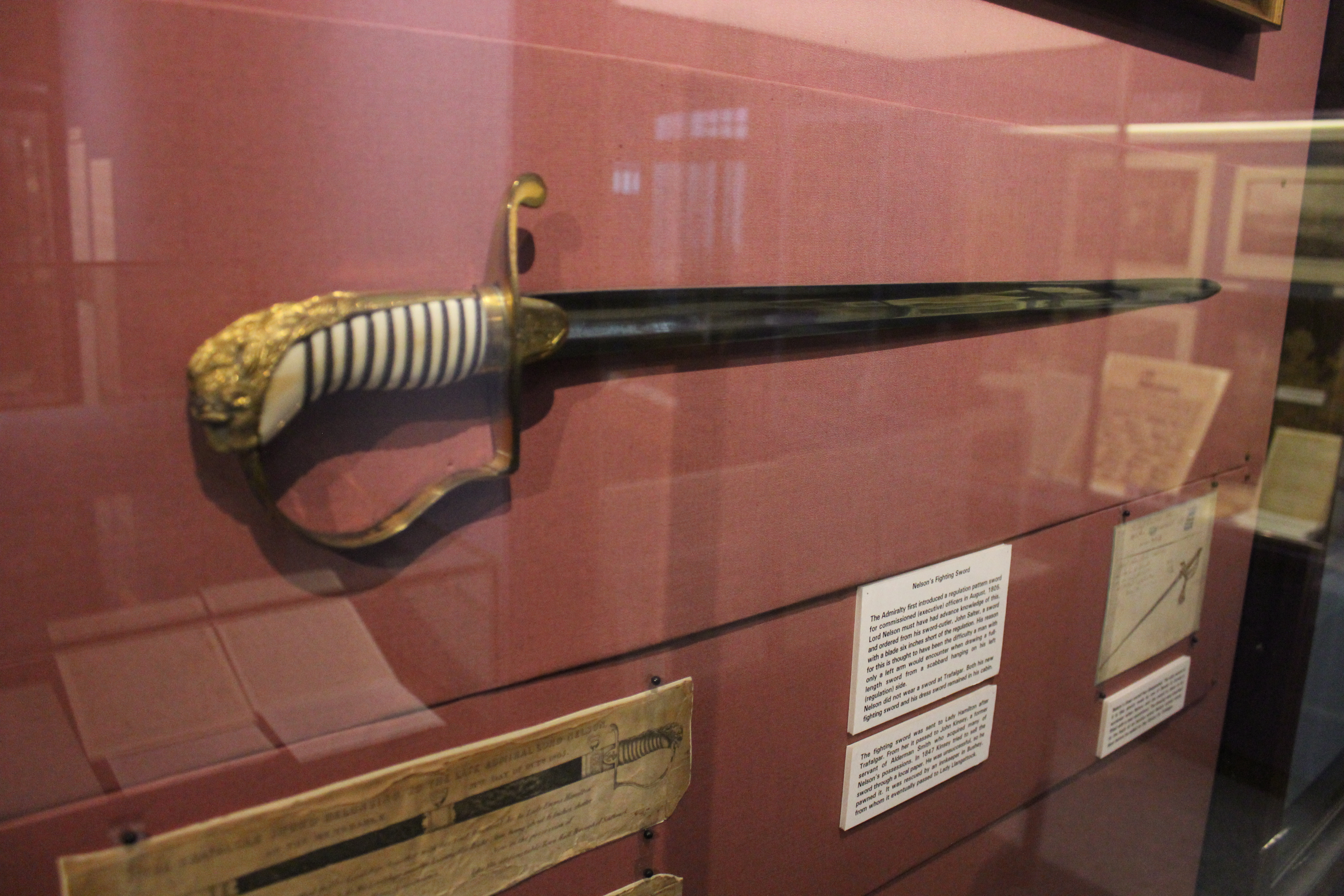
Horatio Nelson's fighting sword

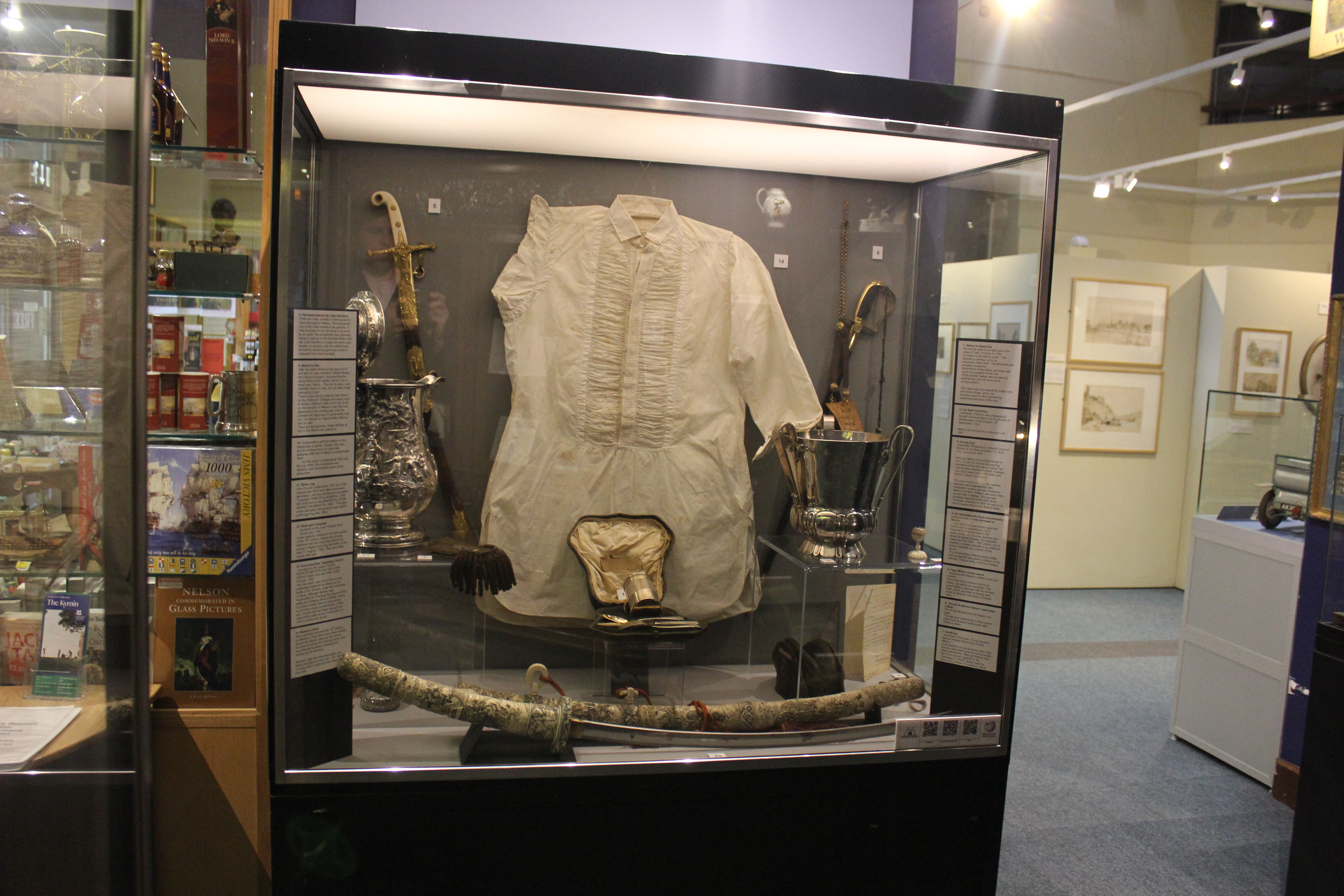
Cabinet of Admiral Nelson fakes and forgeries

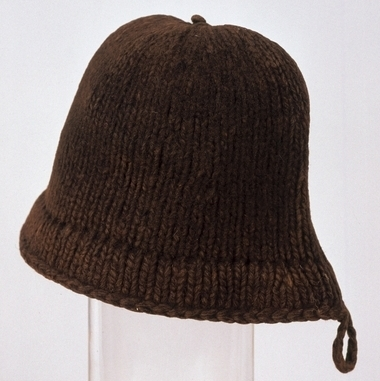
The only known example of an original Monmouth cap, dating from the 16th century on display at the museum

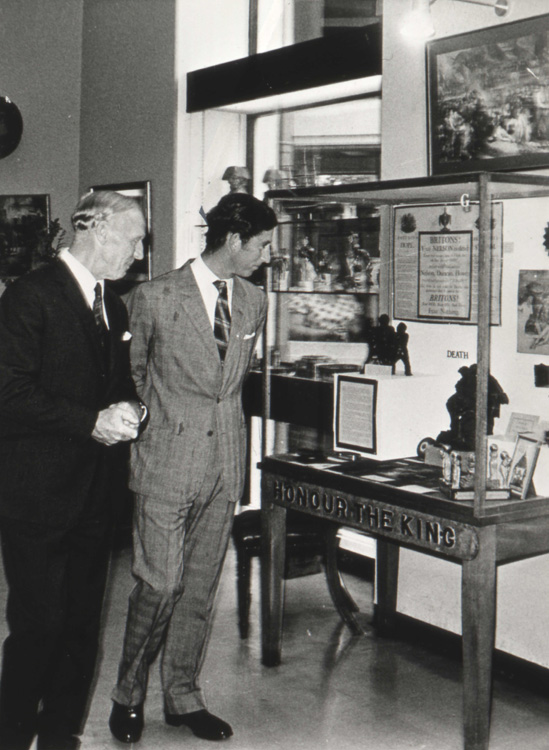
Keith Kissack with Charles III, then Prince of Wales, at the museum in its Priory Street location in 1975
