= Glendower Street, Monmouth =

Historic street in Monmouth, Monmouthshire, Wales

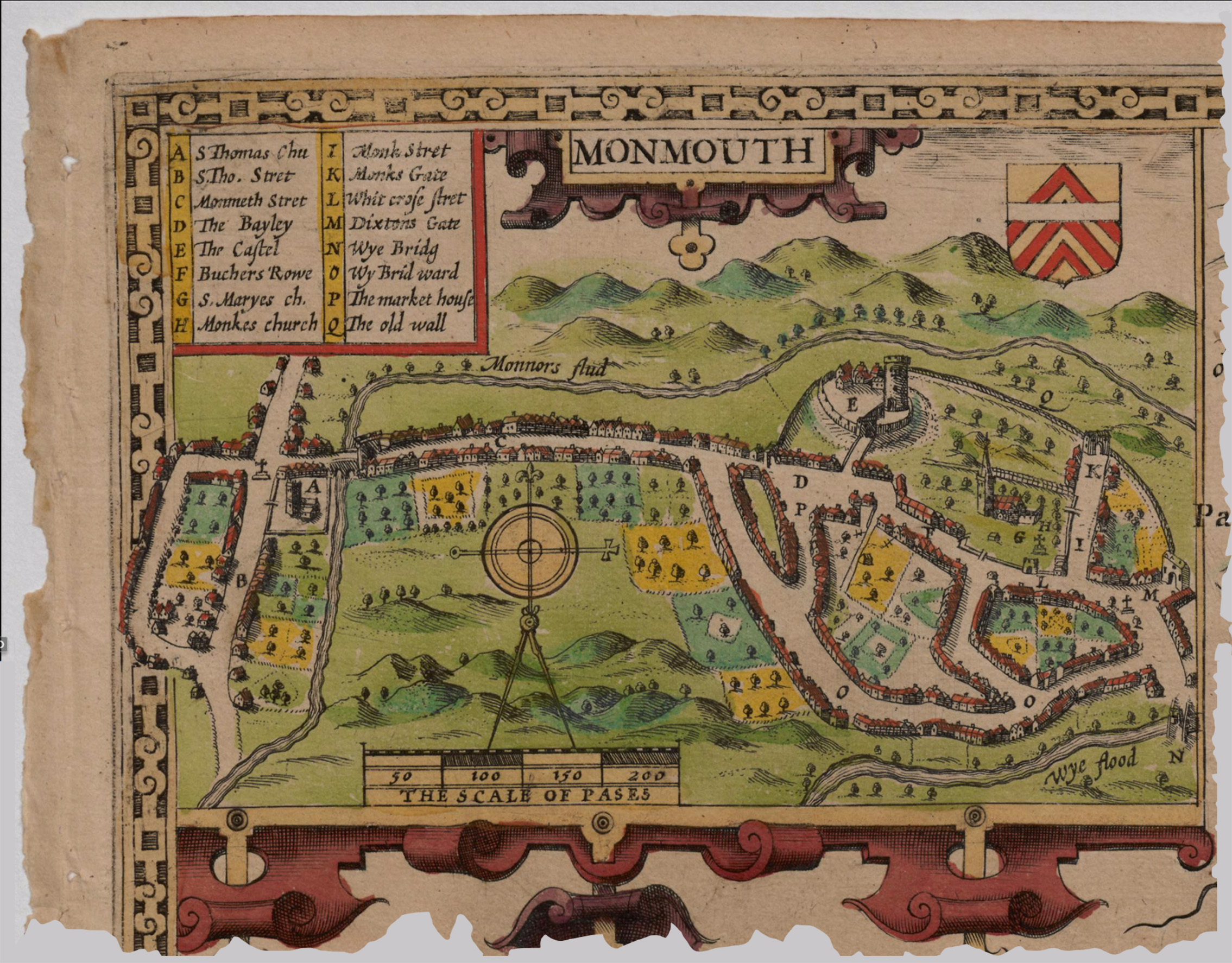
- 1610 map of Monmouth by John Speed
- Interactive map of Glendower Street, Monmouth
- Location: Monmouth, Monmouthshire, Wales
- Coordinates: 51.8111°N 2.7144°W
- West: St John's Street; Agincourt Street

Glendower Street is a historic street in the town centre of Monmouth, Monmouthshire, Wales. It extends to the southeast from the intersection of Agincourt Street and St John's Street, within the medieval town walls. Glendower Street is lined with numerous listed buildings, including one of the 24 blue plaque buildings on the Monmouth Heritage Trail.

== History and location ==
The Telegraph of 25 February 2006 praised Glendower Street as one of the most beautiful in Monmouth, singling out its "charming townhouses." Glendower Street is home to a number of listed buildings, some of the most notable including an award-winning residence converted from a chapel, an apartment building that has seen use first as a gymnasium and then as a museum, and a blue plaque building on the Monmouth Heritage Trail. Glendower Street is located within the medieval walls of Monmouth that were built around 1300 and are shown on Speed's map of the town (pictured). In the medieval and post-medieval period, extending into the mid 19th century, Glendower Street was referred to as Grinder Street or Grinders Street.

In 1804, author Charles Heath indicated that Monmouth was formerly divided into four parochial wards: Wye Bridge Ward, Castle Bailey Ward, Monnow Street Ward, and Over Monnow Ward. Glendower Street was split between two of the wards, with Castle Bailey Ward containing the left side of Grinder Street and Monnow Street Ward containing the right side of Grinder Street. The street now bears the anglicised version of the name of Welsh leader Owen Glendower (Owain Glyndŵr). Glendower Street extends to the southeast from the intersection of Agincourt Street and St John's Street. In 1960, the Monmouthshire County Council ordered that the two streets at the west end of Glendower Street both be made one-way streets, such that traffic proceeded on Agincourt Street from Agincourt Square to Glendower Street (west to east), and traffic proceeded on St John's Street from Glendower Street to Monnow Street (east to west). Since the Coflein listings, there has been at least a partial renumbering of the buildings on Glendower Street (see below).

== Buildings ==
1 and 3 Glendower Street are listed together. They are both 18th-century, three-storey buildings. 1 Glendower Street has a brick exterior and pantile (clay tile) roof. 3 Glendower Street has a stucco finish, with a roof that is a mix of slate and pantile.

The Nelson Rooms (pictured below) at 2 Glendower Street is a 19th-century, Grade II listed building. Thought to have been designed by Newport architect Benjamin Lawrence, the building initially served as a gymnasium and was a gift from Lady Llangattock to the town. It was known as both the Working Men's Gymnasium and the Monmouth Gymnasium. In 1924, after Lady Llangattock's death, the building reopened as the Nelson Museum. It showcased the collection of memorabilia of Admiral Horatio Nelson that the baroness had amassed. The Nelson Museum transferred to the Market Hall in 1969. Since the move of the museum, the building at 2 Glendower Street served for a time as an auction venue. In 2006, the building was converted to residential apartments. The building derives its name, The Nelson Rooms, from the museum that was housed there from 1924 to 1969. It is situated with one elevation along Glendower Street and its gable end along Agincourt Street. The two-storey building has first floor ceilings which are substantially higher than those of the ground floor. The exterior is of red sandstone rubble with contrasting Bath Stone quoins and trim. Both the Glendower Street and Agincourt Street elevations have windows with castellated parapets and aprons.

4 (Hamilton House) and 6 Glendower Street are listed together. They are both 18th-century, three-storey houses with roughcast exteriors and slate roofs.

5 and 7 Glendower Street are listed together. The 18th-century, three-storey listed dwellings have a brick exterior and slate roof.

8 and 10 Glendower Street are listed together. The mid 19th-century, three-storey listed buildings have a roughcast exterior and a slate roof.

9 Glendower Street is an 18th-century, three-storey listed building. It has a two-bay elevation, with a stucco finish and slate roof.

St John's has been described as "one of Monmouth's best-kept secrets." It has had its address recorded at 11 Glendower Street in the late 19th through early 21st centuries. The villa is an 18th-century, Grade II listed building. The eight-bedroom home includes a main building and an annex. It has a two-storey, three-bay street elevation, and a three-storey rear elevation. The facade has a roughcast exterior and fluted columns which flank the pedimented entrance. The property is remarkable for a cast iron, Coalbrookdale verandah along the rear elevation, as well as a formal, Victorian, walled garden which has been separately listed with the Cadw/ICOMOS Register of Parks and Gardens of Special Historic Interest in Wales and is also registered with the Welsh Historic Gardens Trust.

Cranford, formerly at 13 Glendower Street, is thought to be of the early 17th century. The building was altered around 1800 and the current exterior is primarily from that period. The two-storey, three-bay elevation has a painted finish. There is a Welsh slate roof with two chimneys, one to the left and a taller one in the back to the right. The doorway is centrally positioned, and has a six paneled door with fanlight. Early 19th-century windows flank the door and the first floor windows are small, with keystones. In 2012, Cranford has a 15 Glendower Street address.

15 and 17 Glendower Street are listed together.

16 Glendower Street is the premises of a funeral director.

The Monmouth Police Station (pictured below), currently at 19 Glendower Street, is a mid 19th-century, Grade II listed building. The main building is three storeys and there is a two-storey extension to the right. The exterior is stucco and there is a hipped tile roof. The police station was formerly at 17 Glendower Street. 19 Glendower Street had a separate Coflein listing. It described an old pub with a two-storey, two-bay elevation and a roughcast exterior. This is a reference to the Druid's Head Inn next door (see below). The police station not only houses the local police; it serves as a response center for the Gwent Police. The station was one of the Monmouth facilities that welcomed visitors in September 2011 during Open Doors 2011, European Heritage Days in Wales. On 13 March 2012, the BBC News reported that in July 2012 the Monmouth Police Station would be one of seventeen police stations in South East Wales that would no longer be open to the public.

The Druid's Head Inn (pictured below) on Glendower Street is now home to the Monmouth Rugby Football Club. 19th and early 20th century proprietors of the Druid's Head Inn included William Beavan, David Evans, John Mills, and John Pembridge. One of them, David Evans, went on to the Black Swan on nearby St John's Street as an innkeeper by 1881, despite having declared bankruptcy in 1877. The Druid's Head Inn was Grade II listed on 15 August 1974. The Monmouth Rugby Football Club purchased the public house as its headquarters by 1969. The address of the Druid's Head Inn was previously 19 Glendower Street. The facade has a two-storey, two-bay elevation with a roughcast exterior.

22 and 26 Glendower Street are listed together.

Hyam's Mineral Water Works (pictured below) at 23 Glendower Street is one of 24 blue plaque buildings on the Monmouth Heritage Trail. The listed building had served as a bottling plant for mineral water. The proprietor in 1901, John Benjamin Hyam, was described as a "mineral & aerated water manufacturer & ale & porter merchant." Charles Nathaniel Ballinger, manufacturer of "Ballinger's Famous Mineral Waters" since the 1890s, purchased the building at Glendower Street in the 20th century. (Ballinger had been at the Griffin inn at the corner of St Mary's Street and Whitecross Street in 1901.) The Glendower Street building was eventually converted into residential apartments and is now known as Hyam Court. Hyam Court Management Limited incorporated in 1991.

Glendower House (pictured below) was formerly the Glendower Street Congregational Church. It is a 19th-century, Grade II* listed building that was originally built in 1834, and then reconstructed in 1844, designed by William Armstrong of Bristol and built by Lawrence of Monmouth. The three bay, classical facade on Glendower Street features a central entrance flanked by elaborate columns. The bays are square-headed on the ground floor, and round-headed on the first floor. The building was listed on 27 October 1965; its gates and railings were listed on 15 August 1974. In 2002, the chapel which had stood vacant for forty years (the last service in 1962) was restored and converted into an award-winning residence. The original design of the exterior was maintained, exceptions including the addition of two round bays in the back elevation to permit visualization of the garden, and the reduction in height of some of the windows on the sides to match the front facade. The bedroom was on the ground floor, owing to the large amount of daylight on the first floor.

The Glover Music School was considered by author John Newman to be one of two notable buildings on Glendower Street, the other being the Congregational Church.

The Glendower Street Smithy, a listed building, was a blacksmith's workshop.

Henry Burton Court (pictured below) on the south side of Glendower Street provides housing for older people through an almshouse charity managed by Burton Trust. The eight apartments were constructed in 1928 and redeveloped in 1991. The one-bedroom flats are reserved for people who have lived for at least five years in the county. The Henry Burton Almshouse Charity operates in Monmouthshire. The charitable activities of the organization focus on housing and the elderly. At least six of the apartments were Grade II listed on 8 October 2005.

== Gallery ==
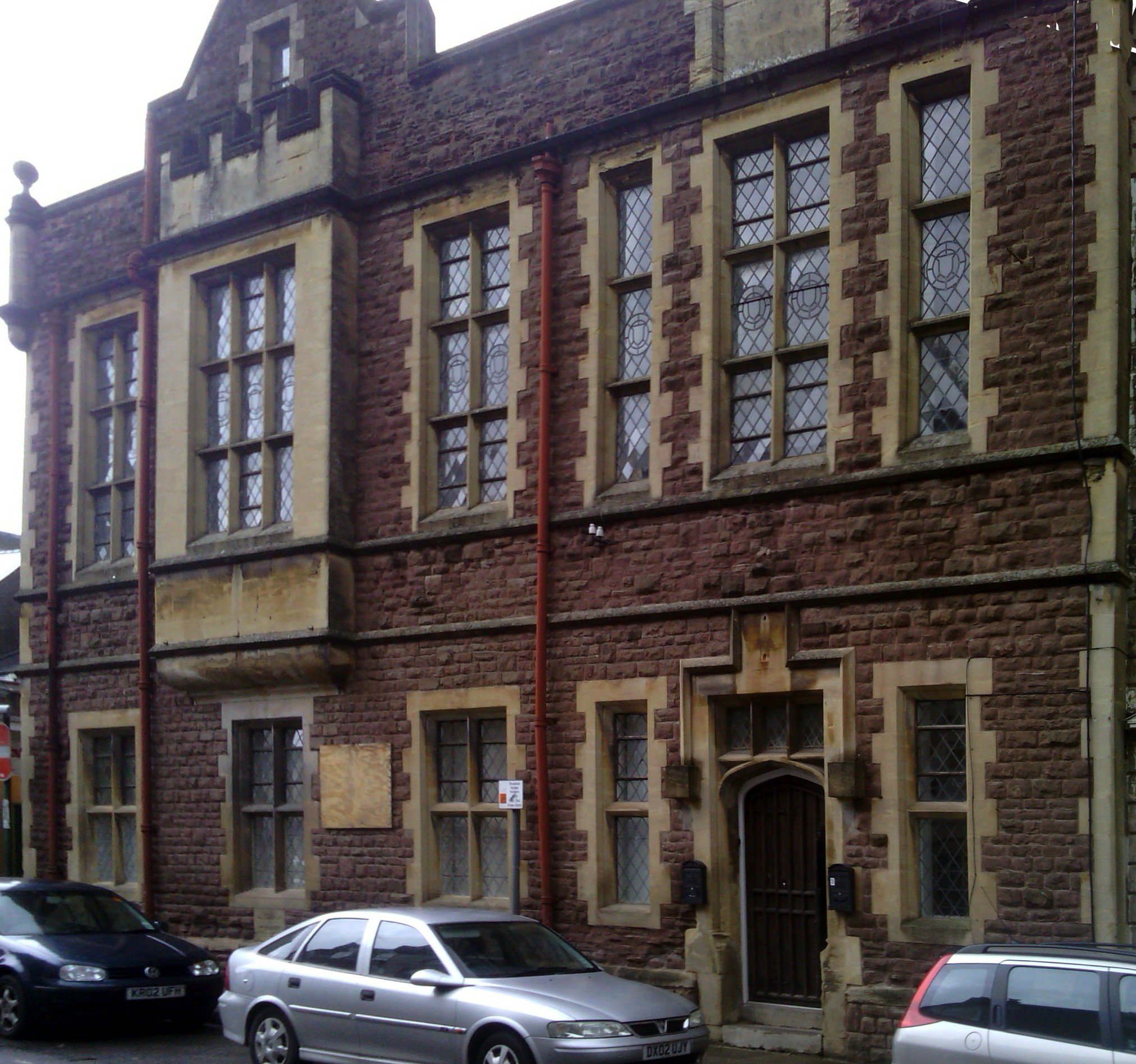
The Nelson Rooms

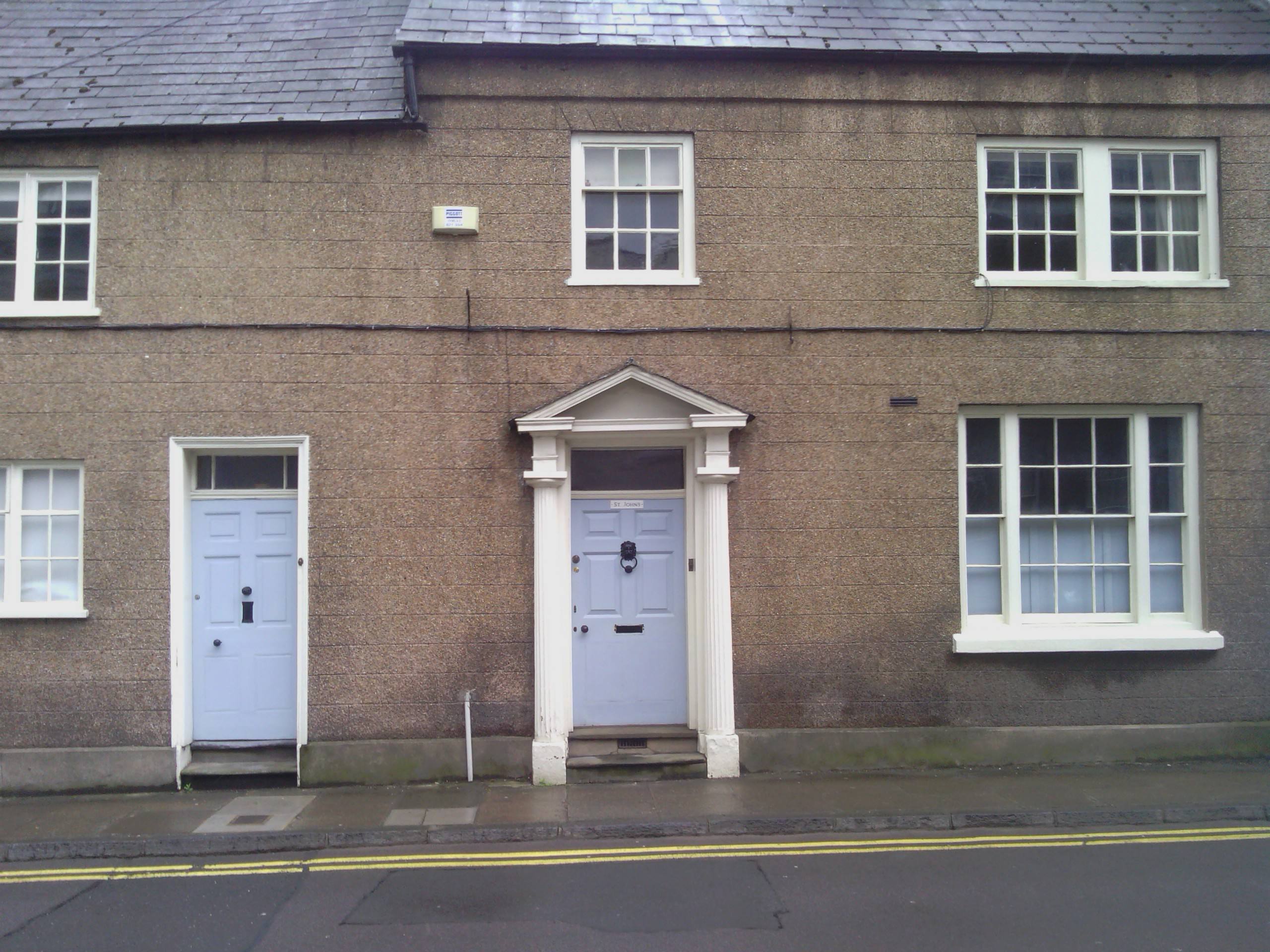
St John's

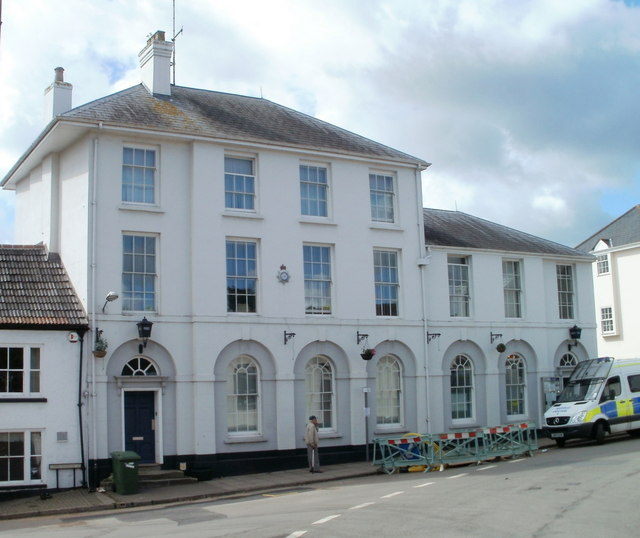
Monmouth Police Station

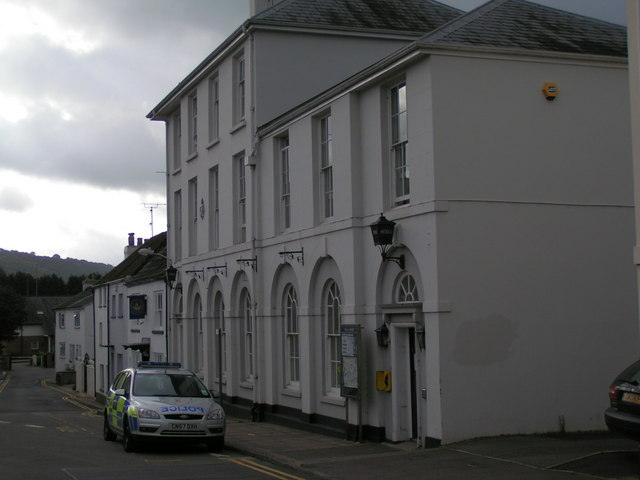
Monmouth Police Station

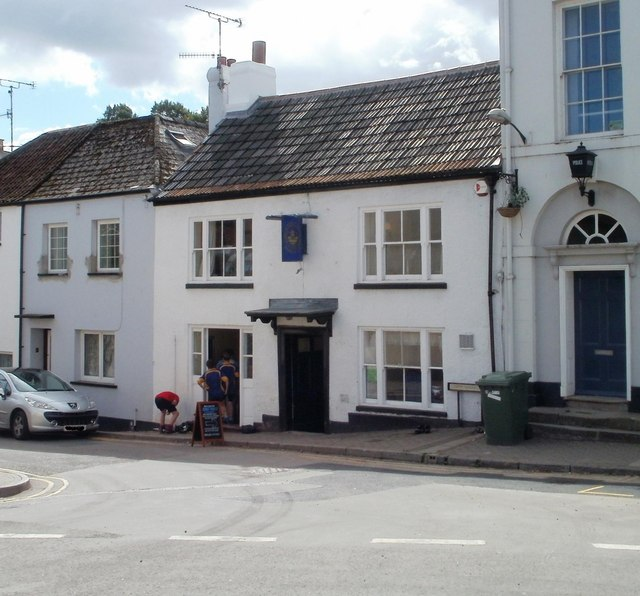
Druid's Head Inn

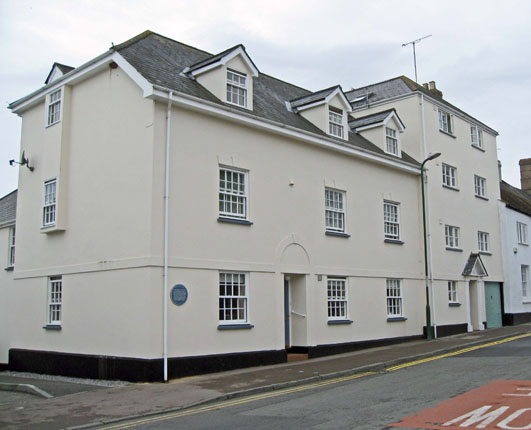
Hyam's Mineral Water Works

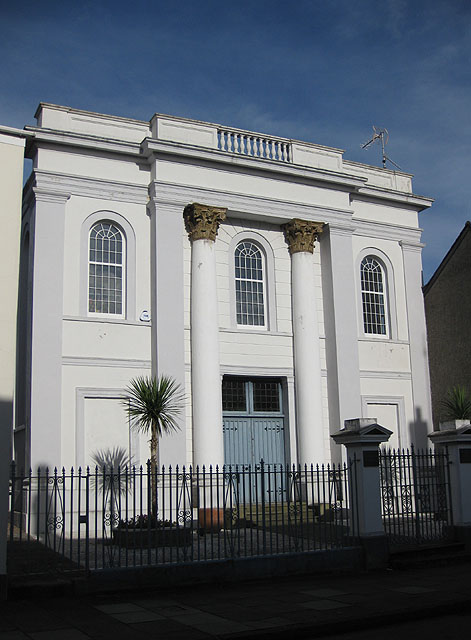
Glendower House

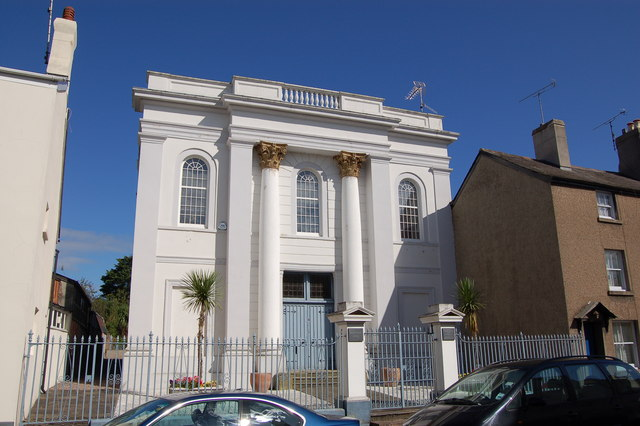
Glendower House

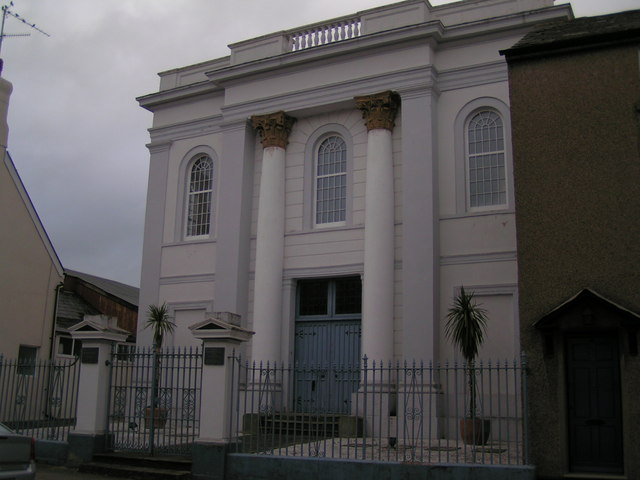
Glendower House

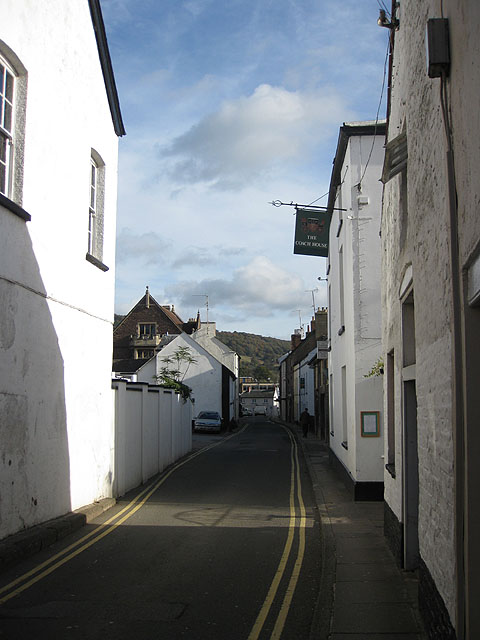
Glendower Street

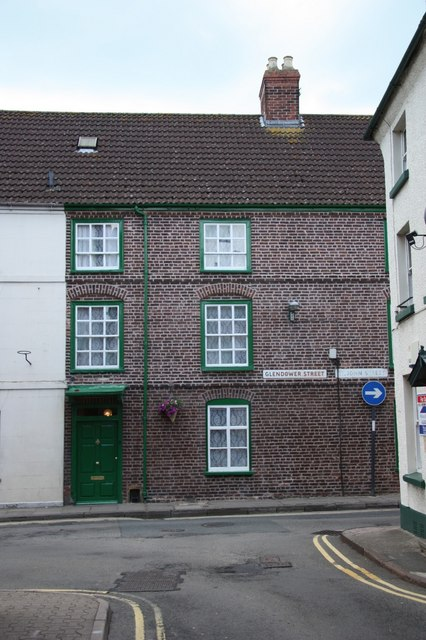
Glendower Street

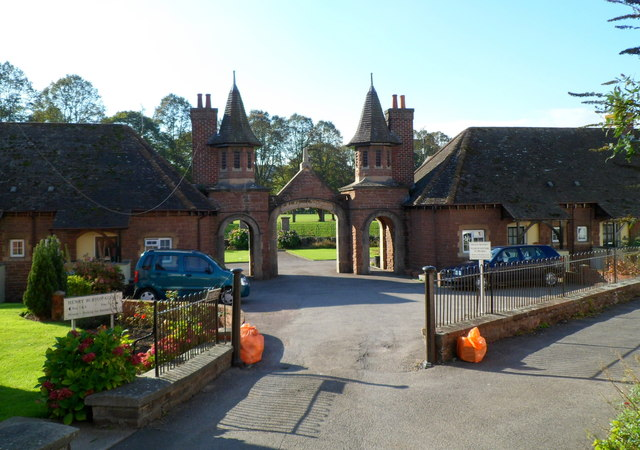
Henry Burton Court

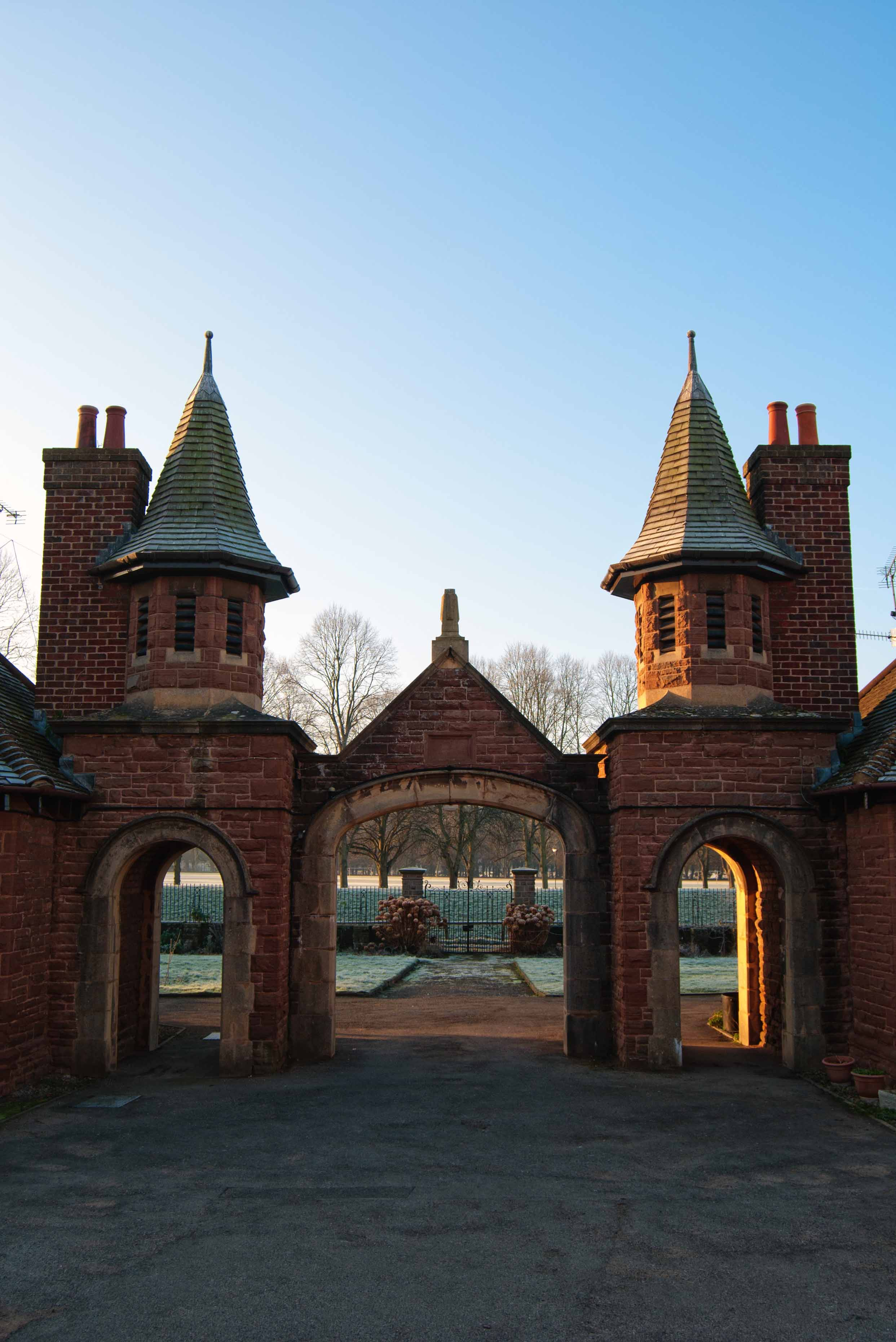
Henry Burton Court

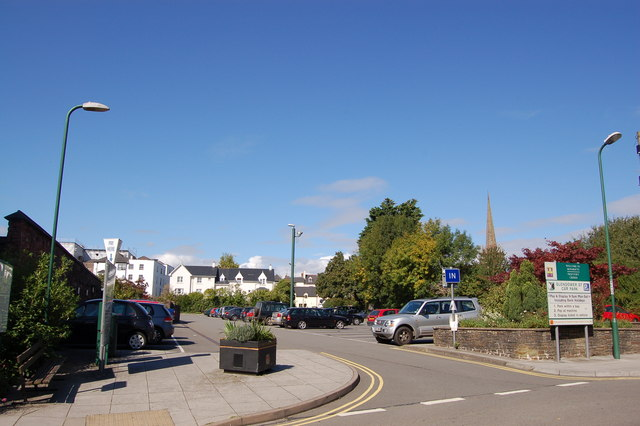
Glendower Street Car Park

== See also ==
- The Nelson Rooms, Monmouth
- St John's, Monmouth
- Monmouth Police Station
- Druid's Head Inn, Monmouth
- Hyam's Mineral Water Works
- Glendower House, Monmouth
