= Druid's Head Inn =

Grade II listed building in Monmouth, Monmouthshire, Wales

Druid's Head Inn, Monmouth
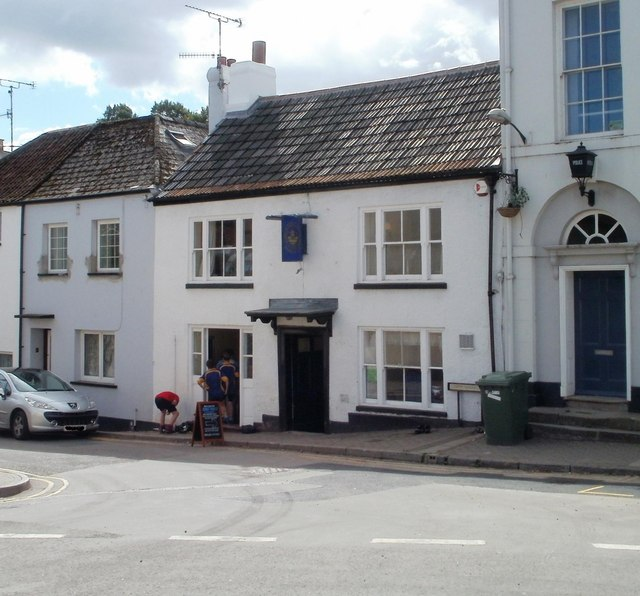
- Druid's Head Inn
- Interactive map of the Druid's Head Inn, Monmouth area

General information
- Location: Glendower Street, Monmouth, Wales
- Coordinates: 51.810845°N 2.713690°W
- Owner: Monmouth Rugby Football Club

Design and construction
- Designations: Grade II Listed

The Druid's Head Inn is a grade II listed building in the town centre of Monmouth, Monmouthshire, Wales. It is located in the historic Glendower Street and Chippenhamgate Street neighbourhood, within the medieval town walls. The building served as a public house during most of its history, but for the last several decades has been the headquarters of the Monmouth Rugby Football Club.

== History ==
The Druid's Head Inn on Glendower Street in Monmouth is a grade II listed building. It is located on the south side of Glendower Street, within the medieval town walls that were built around 1300. The building is adjacent to the Monmouth Police Station, and both have had the 19 Glendower Street address at times (see below). The street on which the Druid's Head Inn is situated was referred to as Grinder Street or Grinders Street in the medieval and post-medieval periods, as late as the mid nineteenth century. The building is located at the corner of Glendower Street (where it veers to the north) and Chippenhamgate Street and, at times, the address has been recorded as Chippenhamgate Street (see below).

Pigot's Directory of Monmouthshire for 1844 indicated that the proprietor of the Druid's Head on Grinder Street was William Beavan.

The London Gazette of 16 October 1877 reported that David Evans, tailor and licensed victualler of the Druid's Head Inn, Glendower Street, Monmouth, had declared bankruptcy.

In Kelly's Directory of Monmouthshire for Monmouth in 1901, John Pembridge is listed as the proprietor of the Druid's Head Inn at Chippenhamgate Street.

By 1969, Monmouth Rugby Football Club purchased the public house as its headquarters. The Druid's Head Inn was grade II listed on 15 August 1974. The listing text indicated that there was a nameplate on the house which claimed a Chippenhamgate Street address, but asserted that it was in error. The pub has a two-storey, two-bay elevation with a roughcast exterior. During the mid-1980s, the club added an extension which included a lounge and dressing rooms. A two-storey extension was constructed in 1998, to accommodate a larger bar on the ground floor and a function room and kitchen on the first floor. The second renovation cost more than £85,000 and was realised through the fundraisers held by the club's volunteers. The Druid's Head Inn remains the headquarters of the Monmouth Rugby Football Club. Over the years, the pub has been known by slightly different names, including the Old Druid's Head and Old Druids Meads.

== See also ==
- Glendower Street, Monmouth
- Monmouth RFC
