= Glyndŵr =

Glyndŵr, also spelled Glyndwr, may refer to:

- Owain Glyndŵr – Medieval Welsh prince and leader
  - Glyndŵr rebellion – 15th century Welsh uprising
- Glyndŵr (district) – District of Wales (1974–1996)
  - Montgomeryshire and Glyndŵr (UK Parliament constituency) – UK Parliament constituency in Wales (2024–)
- Glyndŵr University, now Wrexham University, university in Wales
- Glyndŵr National Park, proposed national park in north-east Wales
- Glyndwr Hackett, Welsh Anglican priest
- Glyndwr Michael, true identity of "Major William Martin" in the British World War II deception Operation Mincemeat
- Glyndwr Renowden, British military chaplain
- Glyndwr Williams, British historian

== See also ==
- Glendower (disambiguation)
