= Baron Llangattock =

Extinct barony in the Peerage of the United Kingdom

- Arms of Rolls of The Hendre, near Monmouth, Barons Llangattock: Or, on a fesse dancettée with plain cotises between three billets sable each charged with a lion rampant of the field, as many bezants. Motto: Celeritas et veritas.
- Creation date: 1892
- Created by: Queen Victoria
- Peerage: Peerage of the United Kingdom
- First holder: John Rolls, 1st Baron Llangattock
- Present holder: Extinct
- Seat: The Hendre

Baron Llangattock, "of the Hendre in the County of Monmouth", was a title in the Peerage of the United Kingdom. It was created in 1892 for John Rolls, of The Hendre in the parish of Llangattock-Vibon-Avel, about 4 miles north-west of Monmouth, Member of Parliament for Monmouthshire from 1880 to 1892. He was succeeded by his eldest son, John Maclean Rolls, the 2nd Baron, who was killed in action at the Battle of the Somme in 1916. As the 2nd Baron was unmarried and his two younger brothers had predeceased him, the title became extinct upon his death. The family estates, including The Hendre in Monmouthshire, passed to the 2nd Baron's only sister Eleanor Rolls, a scientist and balloonist. She was the wife of Sir John Courtown Edward Shelley, 6th Baronet (1871–1951), of Castle Goring, who in 1917 assumed by royal licence the additional surname of Rolls, after which she became known as Eleanor Shelley-Rolls. They had no children and The Hendre estate passed to the Harding-Rolls family, descended from Patricia Rolls, sister of the 1st Baron, which resided at The Hendre until 1987.

The Honourable Charles Rolls, third and youngest son of the 1st Baron, was the co-founder of the Rolls-Royce car manufacturing firm.

== Barons Llangattock (1892) ==
- John Allan Rolls, 1st Baron Llangattock (1837–1912)
- John Maclean Rolls, 2nd Baron Llangattock (1870–1916)
