= Georgiana Rolls, Baroness Llangattock =

British socialite and benefactor

Georgiana, Lady Llangattock
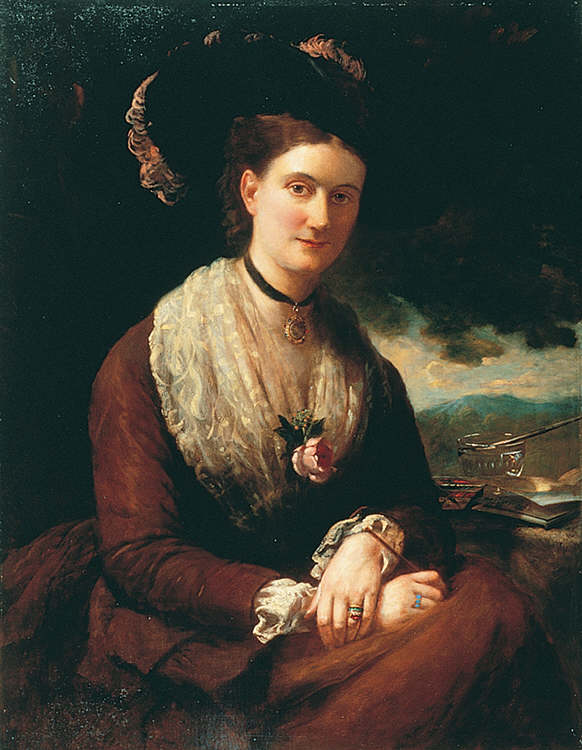
- Portrait by H.Groves
- Born: c. 28 February 1837; Kirkby Overblow, Yorkshire, England
- Died: 1 April 1923 (aged 86)
- Other names: Georgiana Marcia Maclean; Georgiana Marcia Rolls
- Spouse(s): John Allan Rolls, 1st Baron Llangattock
- Children: John Rolls, 2nd Baron Llangattock; Henry Alan Rolls; Eleanor Shelley-Rolls; Charles Stewart Rolls
- Parent: Sir Charles Fitzroy Maclean

Georgiana Marcia Rolls, Lady Llangattock, (née Maclean; 28 February 1837 (baptised) – 1 April 1923) was a British socialite, benefactor and an enthusiast for Horatio Nelson and associated naval heroes. She was the wife of John Rolls, 1st Baron Llangattock, a Victorian landowner, Member of Parliament and agriculturalist. She and her husband lived at The Hendre, a Victorian country house north of Monmouth.

== Biography ==
Georgiana was the daughter of Sir Charles Maclean, 9th Baronet of Morvern and Emily Eleanor (born Marsham). She was born in Kirkby Overblow, Yorkshire, and baptised there on 28 February 1837 by her uncle Rev. Jacob Joseph Marsham. Her mother, who died in April 1838, was the daughter of Rev. Jacob Marsham, Canon of Windsor and rector at Kirkby Overblow, and granddaughter of Robert Marsham, 2nd Baron Romney.

In 1868 she married John Allan Rolls, the only son of John Etherington Welch Rolls and Elizabeth Long. They lived at The Hendre and they also had a house South Lodge at Rutland Gate in London. They had four children: John Maclean Rolls, Henry Alan Rolls, Eleanor Rolls and Charles Stewart Rolls (1877–1910) who was co-founder of Rolls-Royce Limited and the first person to fly the English Channel in both directions.

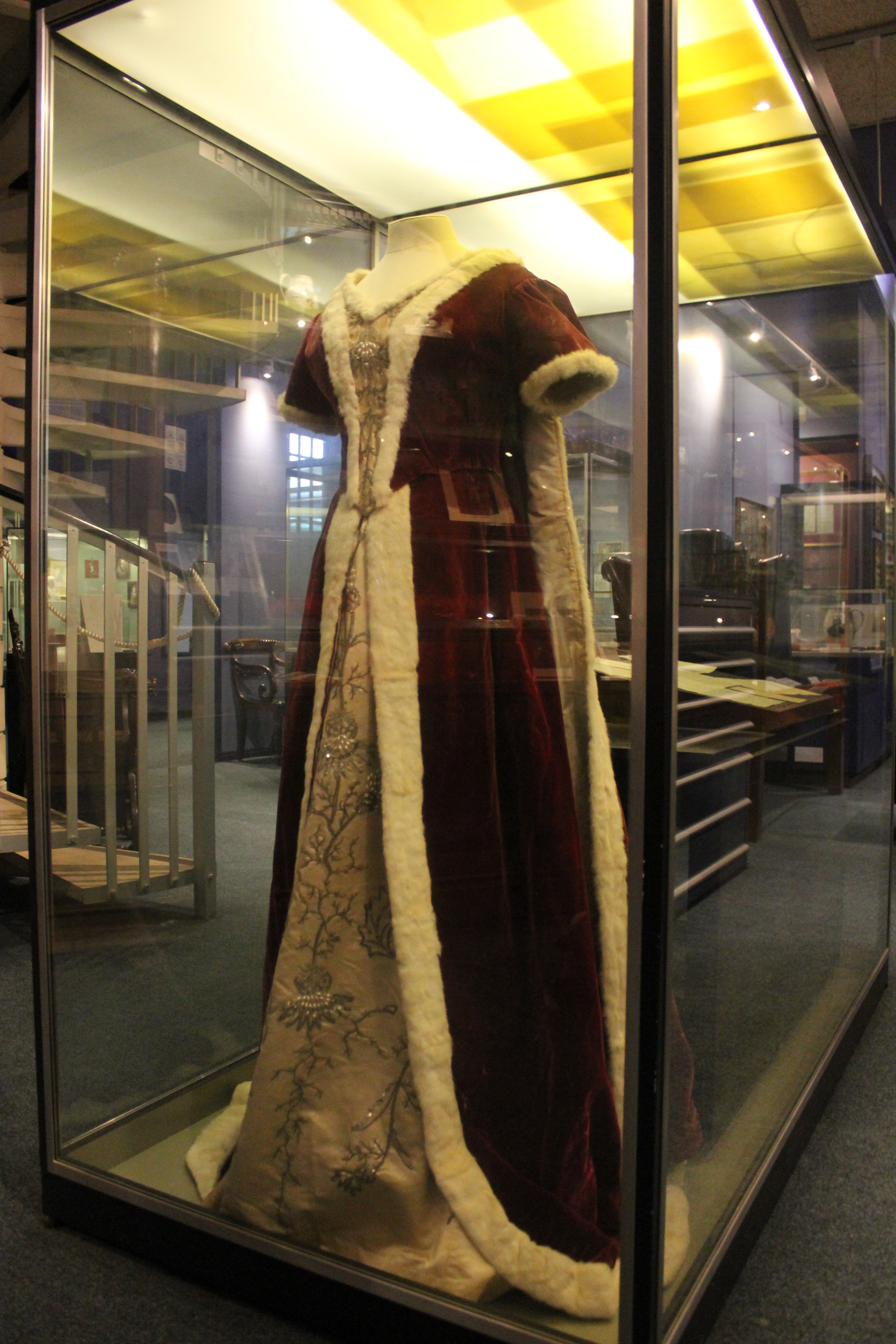
A dress owned by Lady Llangattock at Monmouth Museum

Her husband was appointed High Sheriff of Monmouthshire and he served as MP for Monmouthshire for five years. During this time, The Rolls Hall was built and given to the town of Monmouth to celebrate the Queen's jubilee. Lady Llangattock was known for her love of collecting though John Harris has recently described her collection of furniture bought from other Welsh grand houses as "Jacobogus".

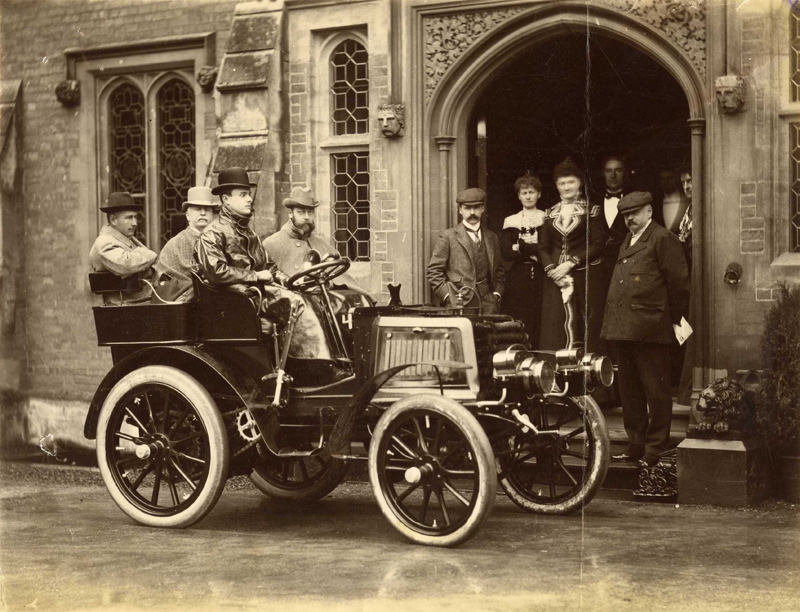
The Duke of York, Lord and Lady Llangattock, Sir Charles Cust and C.S. Rolls at 'The Hendre', 1900

She became Lady Llangattock when her husband became Lord Llangattock in 1892. She and her husband attended the coronation of King Edward VII in 1902. She was an enthusiast for Admiral Nelson and she took part in celebrations at The Kymin where the centenary of his death was commemorated on 21 October 1905.

Her husband's peerage and rank enabled them to invite the Duke and Duchess of York (later King George V and Queen Mary) in 1900 to stay with them at the Hendre. Her youngest son, Charles Rolls, took the royal couple on what might have been their first car ride. Charles was the first British person to die in a flying accident when his plane crashed in 1910.

Lady Llangattock was well known for her philanthropic and social interests, and for promoting the role of women in society. She was in 1902 elected president of the Monmouthshire branch of the Soldiers' and Sailors' Families' Association. In December 1910 she instigated a meeting in Monmouth which set up a branch of the British Red Cross Society in the county, and first considered the setting up of Voluntary Aid Detachments (VAD) in the area. She became the first President of the Monmouthshire branch of the Society.

Lord Llangattock died in 1912. Her two other sons were killed in action during the First World War, so she was the last Lady Llangattock, and her daughter Eleanor Shelley-Rolls (9 October 1872 – 15 September 1961) was the heir to the Hendre.

== Legacy ==
The Llangattock Collection, which includes a substantial quantity of letters written by Nelson to his wife, was bequeathed to the town of Monmouth. The letters, bound into five volumes, had been bought at auction in 1914 from the Nelson family by Lady Llangattock at Christie's. The first three volumes contain letters to his wife from his proposal to their separation, and the first volume contains Nelson's wife's wedding ring. The first building which housed the collection, initially a gymnasium on Glendower Street donated to the town of Monmouth by Lady Llangattock, is now known as the Nelson Rooms. The Monmouth Museum has been called The Nelson Museum as it is based on the Llangattock collections. The museum also houses material about the Rolls family and it contains the 1867 portrait of Lady Llangattock created by H.Groves. The local library at the Rolls Hall also holds a full-length portrait of Lady Llangattock.

== Lineage ==
John Rolls (1735–1801)	Sarah Coysh (c1742–1801)
John Rolls of The Hendre (1776–1837)	Martha
John Etherington Welch Rolls (1807–70)	Elizabeth Mary Long
John Allan Rolls (1837–1912)	Georgiana Marcia Maclean (1837–1923)
John Maclean Rolls (1870–1916)	Henry Alan Rolls (1871–1916)	Eleanor Georgiana Shelley-Rolls (1872–1961)	Charles Stewart Rolls (1877–1910) (co-founder of Rolls-Royce)
