= Philip Nicholas =

England international rugby union footballer

- Born: Philip Leach Nicholas; 30 May 1876 Monmouth, Wales
- Died: 31 January 1952 (aged 75) Barnstaple, England
- School: Monmouth School
- University: Oxford University
- Occupation: Clergyman

Rugby union career
- Position: wing
Amateur team(s)
Years	Team	Apps	(Points)
- Monmouth RFC
–	Oxford University RFC		
–	Exeter RFC		
–	Barbarian F.C.		
–	Devon		
International career
Years	Team	Apps	(Points)
1902	England	1	(0)

Philip Leach Nicholas (30 May 1876 – 31 January 1952) was an international rugby union wing who played club rugby for Oxford University and Exeter. Nicolas played one international rugby game for England in 1902.

== Personal history ==
Philip Nicholas was born in Monmouth in 1876, the son of Thomas Leach Nicholas, a proprietor of a small chemical works, and his wife Julia Elizabeth. He was educated locally at Monmouth School before matriculating to Oxford University. After leaving university he became a clergyman and he was ordained in 1908. He moved to Devon where he was married to Annie Margaret. Nicolas died in 1952 and was buried at St. John the Baptist's Church Cemetery in Bishop's Tawton, Devon.

== Rugby career ==
Nicholas played rugby from a young age representing Monmouth School and Monmouth. When he went to Oxford University, he was selected to play for the university team and won three successive sporting Blues by playing in the Varsity Matches of 1897, 1898 and 1899. On leaving Oxford he moved to Devon and there he joined Exeter RFC and was also selected to represent Devon at county level. During his time with Devon, the county won the County Championship of 1900–01, which was also the season he represented the Rest of England.

In 1902, while an Exeter player, Nicolas was selected for his one and only international cap for England. He was called into the team at wing for the opening game of the 1902 Home Nations Championship, played at the Rectory Field in Blackheath against Wales, his home country. Wales won by a narrow 9–8 scoreline, and in the next game of the season Nicholas was not selected, his short international career was over.

=== International caps ===
England

- Wales 1902

== Bibliography ==
- Marshall, Howard; Jordon, J.P. (1951). Oxford v Cambridge, The Story of the University Rugby Match. London: Clerke & Cockeran.
- Maule, Raymond (1992). The Complete Who's Who of England Rugby Union Internationals. Derby: Breedon Books. ISBN 1-873626-10-X.
