= Monmouth Police Station =

Grade II listed building in Monmouth, Monmouthshire, Wales

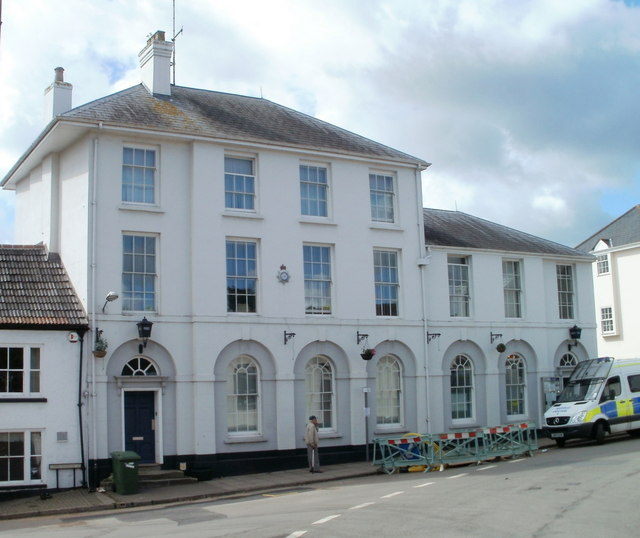
- Monmouth Police Station
- Interactive map of the Monmouth Police Station area

General information
- Location: 19 Glendower Street, Monmouth, Wales
- Coordinates: 51.810892°N 2.713894°W

Design and construction
- Designations: Grade II Listed

The Monmouth Police Station is a Grade II listed building in the town centre of Monmouth, Monmouthshire, Wales. It is located in Glendower Street, within the medieval town walls. In March 2012, it was announced that the Monmouth Police Station was one of seventeen police stations in South East Wales that would no longer be open to the public.

== History ==
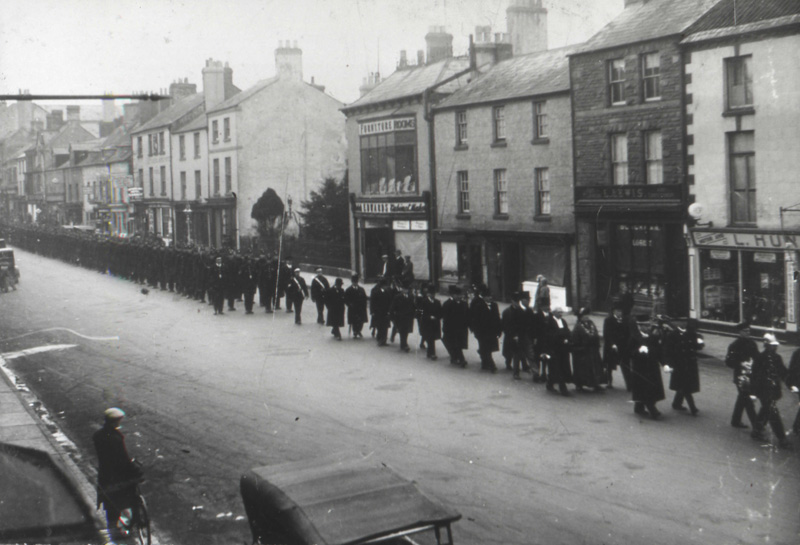
April 1931 funeral procession for William Bullock, Superintendent of Police

Before 1881, the town of Monmouth maintained and staffed its own police station. Monmouthshire County assumed control of Monmouth for policing in 1881, and Monmouth eliminated its own police force. The county rented a building in Agincourt Street as a police station. In 1895, the Monmouthshire County Council purchased a building in Glendower Street, and redeveloped it as a police station. The Agincourt Street facility was no longer needed.

Kelly's Directory of Monmouthshire indicates that, in 1901, the Monmouth Police Station on Glendower Street was staffed by Captain Vincent E. Parker, "Superintendent of the Borough County Constabulary," as well as two sergeants and seven constables. Police Superintendent Parker did not live at the police station; rather, he resided in the Overmonnow area with his family. Ten years earlier, the native of France had been Superintendent of Police in Tredegar, Monmouthshire. While Parker did not reside at the station in 1901, other members of the police force did call it (or the building to the right of it) home. Police Sergeant John Tucker resided at 13 A Glendower Street with his family. Police constable James Collins boarded there as well.

In 1911, the address of the Monmouth Police Station was recorded as 15 Glendower Street. The station was the residence of Police Sergeant Charles Jones, a native of Herefordshire, and his family. Constables Albert Jenkins and Frederick Dries, of Monmouthshire and Middlesex respectively, boarded there as well. Police Sergeant Jones had lived on Hereford Road in 1901. William Bullock was Superintendent of Police in 1923. His title was "Superintendent of the County and Borough Constabulary." Two sergeants and six constables were also at Glendower Street.

The Monmouth Police Station at 19 Glendower Street is a mid 19th-century, listed building. It is located within the medieval walls of the town, built around 1300. The main building is three storeys with a four-bay elevation, and there is a two-storey extension to the right with a three-bay elevation. The exterior is stucco and there is a hipped tile roof. Glendower Street, the site of the Monmouth Police Station since 1895, has been partially renumbered since the early 20th century. In 1901, the station (or the building housing some of the police staff) was documented at 13A Glendower Street, the record immediately next to that for the Druid's Head Inn at 19 Glendower Street. In 1911, the station was at 15 Glendower Street. Decades later, at the time of the heritage listings, at least a portion of the police building was recorded at 17 Glendower Street.

There is a separate Coflein listing at 19 Glendower Street. It describes an old pub with a two-storey, two-bay elevation and a roughcast exterior. This is a reference to the Druid's Head Inn, to the immediate left (southeast) of the police station. It was the public house that had the 19 Glendower Street address for much of the 19th and 20th centuries. The Monmouth Police Station was grade II listed on 15 August 1974. The fencing and gate behind 17 Glendower Street, also part of the station, are adjacent to those of the Henry Burton Court residences and are positioned in front of Chippenham Park. They were grade II listed on 8 October 2005.

The building not only houses the local police, it also serves as a response center for the Gwent Police. The Gwent Police are responsible for an area of approximately 600 square miles. The Monmouth Police Station was one of the Monmouth facilities that welcomed visitors in September 2011 during Open Doors 2011, European Heritage Days in Wales. The event was put together by the Monmouth Civic Society and the Civic Trust for Wales. On 31 May 2012, the Gwent Police announced that the next Monmouth Off Street Project (MOSP) event had been scheduled for 24 June 2012. The MOSP began in 2009 in response to the perceived increase in anti-social behaviour of Monmouth youths. When queried, local children had noted the lack of youth facilities in the Monmouth area and had suggested a new skate park. The MOSP team meets regularly and plans fundraising activities to finance the skate park, with the event scheduled for June 2012 a zip line in Chepstow.

On 13 March 2012, the BBC News reported that as of July of that year, seventeen police stations in South East Wales would close to the public, with only five still offering front desk service. The closures were reported to be undertaken as part of a program of cost-saving measures at Gwent Police. The Monmouth Police Station was one of the buildings that would no longer be open to the public.

== See also ==
Glendower Street, Monmouth
