= Owen Glendower (disambiguation) =

Owain Glyndŵr (c. 1359 – 20 September 1415) was a Welsh nobleman, whose name is sometimes Anglicised as Owen Glendower.

Owen Glendower or Owain Glyndŵr may also refer to:

- Owen Glendower (Shakespeare character), in William Shakespeare's play Henry IV, Part One
- Owen Glendower (novel), by John Cowper Powys
- HMS Owen Glendower (1808), a British warship
- Owain Glyndŵr, a locomotive on the Vale of Rheidol Railway

== See also ==
- Glendower (disambiguation)
