= Glendower House, Monmouth =

Listed building in Monmouth, Wales

Glendower House
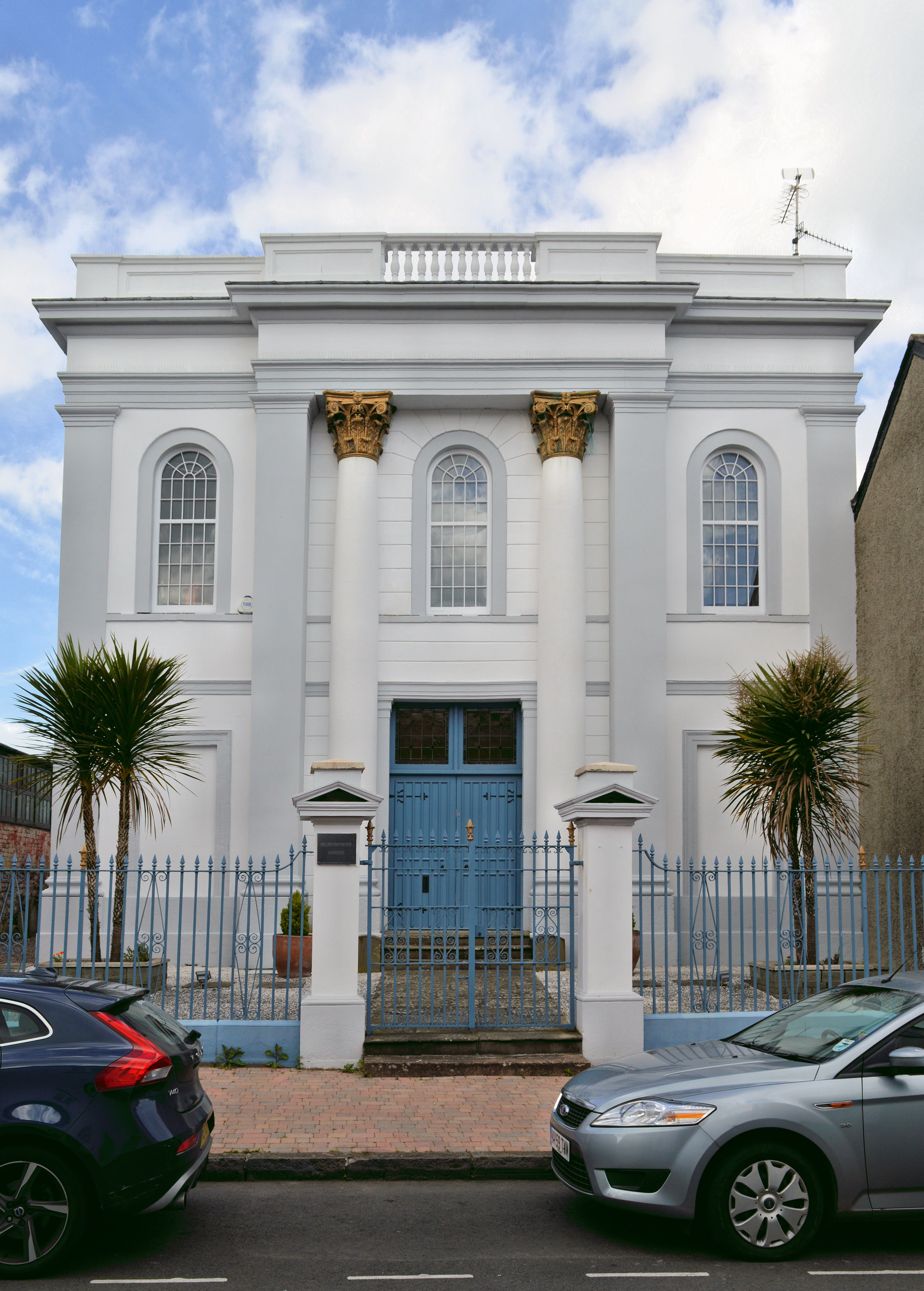
- Glendower House
- Interactive map of the Glendower House area
- Former names: Monmouth Congregational Chapel

General information
- Type: Private residence; Former chapel
- Architectural style: Georgian
- Location: Monmouth, Wales
- Coordinates: 51.8113°N 2.7142°W
- Construction started: 1843
- Completed: 1844

Design and construction
- Architect: William Armstrong
- Designations: Grade II* listed building

Glendower House (or Glyndŵr House), Glendower Street, Monmouth, Wales, is a Victorian former Congregational chapel constructed in a Classical style. The Royal Commission on the Ancient and Historical Monuments of Wales describes it as "a chapel of exceptional sophistication and elaboration of design and one of the earliest Italianate chapels in Wales". It is named after Owain Glyndŵr.

== History ==
Monmouth's Congregationalists first worshipped at Dixton Gate before moving firstly to Dyffryn House on St Mary Street and then to Glendower Street. They were a prosperous and prominent congregation, with members involved in many of the town's activities, such as the eisteddfod.

The building was constructed in 1843/44 to the design of architect William Armstrong of Bristol. The central bay is defined by giant Corinthian columns in antis. It is a smaller version of the Brunswick Chapel in Bristol, which Armstrong also designed. The building has an impressive neoclassical façade, and memorial windows in stained glass by the Camm Brothers of Smethwick. The building was listed at Grade II* on 27 October 1965 and, after near-complete dereliction, was converted into a private house in 2002. Its owner, Anthony Sully, was awarded a substantial grant by Cadw for the conversion, which he designed himself. The project featured on three UK television programmes and won a Civic Trust for Wales award in 2003–4.
