= DUSP23 =

Protein-coding gene in humans

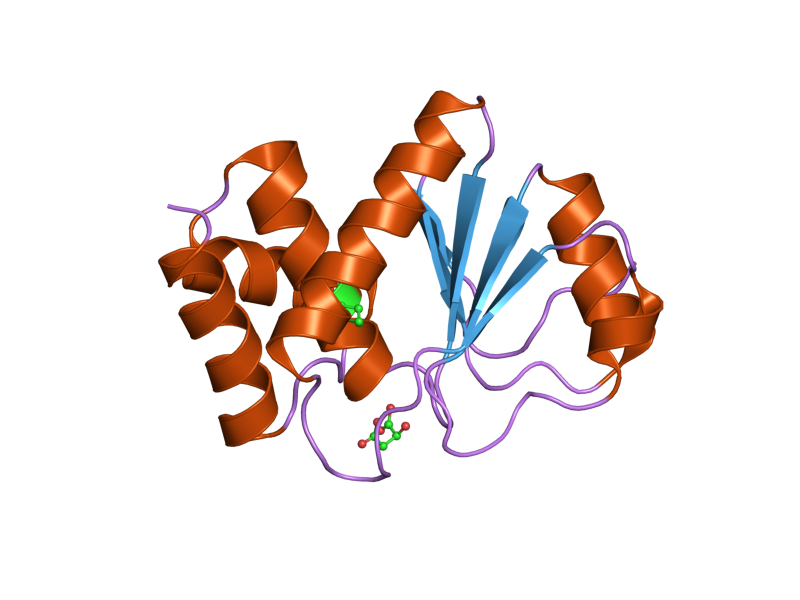

Identifiers
- Aliases: DUSP23, DUSP25, LDP-3, MOSP, VHZ, dual specificity phosphatase 23, LDP3
- External IDs: OMIM: 618361; MGI: 1915690; GeneCards: DUSP23
Available structures
PDB	Ortholog search: PDBe RCSB
PDB	List of PDB id codes 2IMG, 4ERC
Enzyme activity
EC #	BRENDA	ExPASy	KEGG	MetaCyc
3.1.3.16	↗	↗	↗	↗
3.1.3.48	↗	↗	↗	↗

Gene location (Human)
Chr.	Chromosome 1 (human)
Band	1q23.2	Start	159,780,932 bp
Band	1q23.2	End	159,782,543 bp

Gene location (Mouse)
Chr.	Chromosome 1 (mouse)
Band	1|1 H3	Start	172,458,331 bp
Band	1|1 H3	End	172,460,529 bp
RNA expression pattern
Bgee	Human / Mouse (ortholog); Top expressed in: left adrenal cortex; olfactory zone of nasal mucosa; right lobe of liver; right adrenal gland; minor salivary glands; right adrenal cortex; mucosa of transverse colon; human kidney; mucosa of esophagus; tendon of biceps brachii / Top expressed in: muscle of thigh; skeletal muscle tissue; right kidney; triceps brachii muscle; quadriceps femoris muscle; interventricular septum; sternocleidomastoid muscle; vastus lateralis muscle; medial head of gastrocnemius muscle; zygote; More reference expression data
BioGPS	n/a
Gene ontology
Molecular function	protein tyrosine phosphatase activity; protein serine/threonine phosphatase activity; phosphoprotein phosphatase activity; hydrolase activity; protein binding; phosphatase activity; protein tyrosine/serine/threonine phosphatase activity
Cellular component	cytoplasm; cytosol; nucleus; nucleoplasm
Biological process	protein dephosphorylation; dephosphorylation; peptidyl-tyrosine dephosphorylation
Sources:Amigo / QuickGO
Orthologs
Databases	NCBI: entry; OMA: entry
Species	Human	Mouse
Entrez	54935	68440
Ensembl	ENSG00000158716	ENSMUSG00000026544
UniProt	Q9BVJ7	Q6NT99
RefSeq (mRNA)	NM_017823; NM_001319658; NM_001319659	NM_026725
RefSeq (protein)	NP_001306587; NP_001306588; NP_060293	NP_081001
Location (UCSC)	Chr 1: 159.78 – 159.78 Mb	Chr 1: 172.46 – 172.46 Mb
PubMed search
- Wikidata
View/Edit Human	View/Edit Mouse

Dual specificity protein phosphatase 23, also known as low molecular mass dual specificity phosphatase 3 (LDP-3), is an enzyme (EC 3.1.3.16 and EC 3.1.3.48) that in humans is encoded by the DUSP23 gene.
