= Monmouth RFC =

Welsh rugby union club, based in Monmouth

(Wales) Monmouth RFC
- Full name: Monmouth Rugby Football Club
- Founded: 1873; 153 years ago
- Location: Monmouth, Wales
- Ground: Monmouth Sportsground
- Chairman: Andrew Davies
- President: Byron Hapgood
- Coach: Chay Billen
- League: WRU Division One East
- 2021-22: 11th WRU Division Four East
Team kit

Official website
- www.monmouthrfc.com

Monmouth Rugby Football Club is a rugby union club, from Monmouth in South Wales. The club is a member of the Welsh Rugby Union and is a feeder club for the Newport Gwent Dragons.

The Senior XV presently play in the Welsh Rugby Union Division One East. The Second XV, known as the Druids, play in the Monmouthshire League. The club also runs a youth team, junior and mini rugby sections.

== History ==
Monmouth Rugby Football Club was founded in 1873. The game was brought into the town through Monmouth School. A master introduced it and it was a combination of older boys and town players who made up the team before eventually separating.

The Monmouthshire Beacon bears evidence of the first official town team in 1878. On 24 October 1879 at the annual meeting, it was decided to change the name from "The Monmouth Football Club" to "The Monmouth (Drybridge) Football Club and the kit colours to be those of Mr Crompton-Roberts, very red and black. Rugby was very strong in the town in the 1880s and 1890s. Sometime in 1885 Monmouth FC amalgamated with Monmouth Rangers, playing their first match since amalgamating against Monmouth Grammar School on 8th October 1885, which was played on Old Dixton Road, Monmouth, where Monmouth Town beat the School team by 3 goals, five tries, and 6 touches down in self-defence to nil. In addition to the senior side there was a junior side known as Monmouth Juniors. The 1888-1889 team under the leadership of E. Dodds were "Invincible". They played 15, won twelve and drew three. In their ranks they had P.L. Nicholas an England international. The Monmouthshire Beacon proclaimed, that the phenomenal success of the club had been, not due to luck but downright hard work and thoroughly deserved the title "Invincible".

In 1902 the team were "Invincible" again. They played 20, won 17 and drew three under the captaincy was R.G.Williams. The club displays in its lounge a photograph of the team and the caps that were awarded to L.Merrick and T.Hughes who were members of that great side.

In the 1930s, Monmouth fielded several good sides. In 1932, the team had a cosmopolitan make-up, containing A.C. Smith an Australian, R. Thompson a Scottish international, Peter Hordern an English international and Scotsman Crictai Millar. The 1935–1936 team was of some note. They had an impressive record, playing 33, and winning 28, drawing four and lost only once. They had 267 points for and 97 against. A year earlier the club started playing on Monmouth Sportsground for the first time. The Sportsground remains the main venue for the club, although today it requires pitches on Chippenhan to accommodate 2nd XV, Youth, Junior and Mini Rugby Teams.

Monmouth RFC HQ
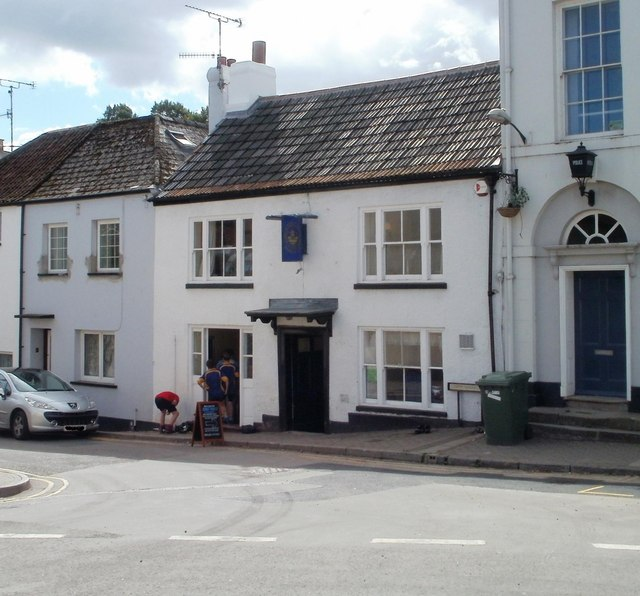
- Druid's Head Inn
- Interactive map of the Monmouth RFC HQ area

General information
- Location: Monmouth, United Kingdom
- Coordinates: 51.81086°N 2.71368°W

In 1969 the club took over the Druid's Head Inn public house which today is its headquarters. This building became a Grade II Listed building in August 1974. In 1984-1985 the club built a lounge extension and new changing rooms. In 1998 a two-storey extension was built to provide a large function room with a new kitchen on the first floor and a larger ground floor bar area. The latter project cost over £85,000 and was paid for by fund raising events.

In the 1980s another Monmouth boy and Cambridge Blue, captained Wales. Butler another No. 8, went on to play for Wales, sixteen times and captained Wales in six major internationals; he also toured New Zealand with the British Lions. In 1975-1976 the club produced its first Welsh Youth cap. David Fryer went on to captain Ebbw Vale and was selected to tour Canada with the Welsh team but injury prevented him going. The club continues to run a Youth XV and several members have represented their District XV. One of the notable moments for the Youth was at the Tiverton Youth Sevens Tournament in 1976. An excellent performances by the Monmouth squad, saw them account for Cardiff Youth, with future Welsh scrum half Terry Holmes in their ranks and then Bristol Youth in the final.

== Notable former players ==
- (Wales) Kenyon Jones (1 cap)

== See also ==
- Monmouth Rugby Club in Monmouth County, New Jersey, United States
