= Hyam's Mineral Water Works =

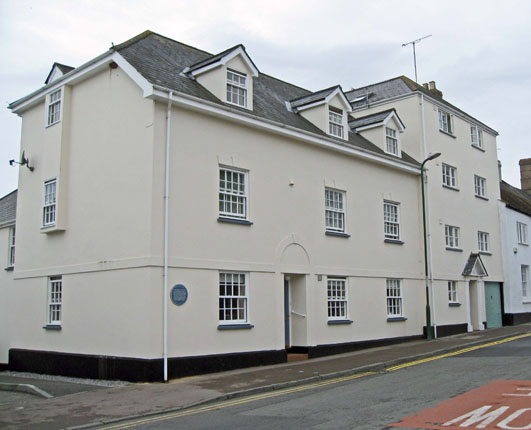
- 23 Glendower Street, site of the Mineral Water Works
- Interactive map of the Hyam's Mineral Water Works area

General information
- Location: 23 Glendower Street, Monmouth, Wales
- Coordinates: 51°48′39.6″N 2°42′50.9″W
- Completed: <1866

Hyam's Mineral Water Works is a nineteenth-century building at 23 Glendower Street, Monmouth, Wales. Formerly a mineral water works, it is currently used as residential apartments. The building holds one of the 24 blue plaques awarded by the Monmouth Civic Society to buildings of especial historical and social interest, and features on the Monmouth Heritage Trail.

== History ==
A mineral water works, for the manufacture of soda water, lemonade and ginger beer, was established in Glendower Street in 1866 by Thomas E. Hyam, a leading figure in nineteenth-century Monmouth. He was a corn and timber merchant, saw mill owner, and shop owner, who became Monmouth's mayor in 1875/6 and was also a Justice of the Peace. To quote Keith Kissack, "No committee or association was considered complete unless it included his name". Residences in Monmouth associated with the Hyam family were Cornwall House in Monnow Street and Parade House on North Parade. In 1870, the Duke of Beaufort commended his mineral waters, writing:

"For upwards of six months I have used no Seltzer water but Mr Hyam's of Monmouth… I have found it most excellent. I have never been so well supplied."

In 1895 Kelly's Directory of Monmouthshire for 1901 describes John B Hyam's business as "mineral & aerated water manufacturer & ale & porter merchant." About this time proprietary medicines became popular and were advertised in the Monmouthshire Beacon, amongst which was 'Hyam's Anti-Influenza Tonic Water'.

Hyam owned a saw mill and timber yard at Wyesham, and owned boats known as trows for hauling his timber and carrying goods on the River Wye. He also had a retail shop at 33, Monnow Street, designed by Lawrence of Newport and built by Lewis of Monmouth in 1866. The new building of freestone with Aberdeen granite pillars was widely praised at the time. The spandrels were elaborately carved and it was one of the first shops in Monmouth to introduce curved plate glass windows. The premises are, in 2012, occupied by a kitchenware and gifts retailer.

In 1911 the business was taken over by Charles Ballinger, and traded as Ballinger's Mineral Water Works until the 1960s. Ballinger was also the landlord of the Griffin Hotel in Whitecross Street. He traded as a Mineral Water Manufacturer and bottler of Bass and Worthington's Ales, Guinness Stout and Wheatley's Hop Bitters. This continued until the 1960s when the firm closed down. The premises were then occupied by Ebley Ltd., a tyre company, who subsequently relocated to the Mayhill Industrial Estate, and the buildings on Glendower Street were converted into apartments and named Hyam Court.
