= Welsh Historic Gardens Trust =

Conservation organisation in Wales

- Abbreviation: WHGT
- Formation: 1989 (charitable status 1994)
- Legal status: Charity
- Headquarters: Aberglasney, Carmarthenshire, Wales
- Location: Wales
- Region served: Wales
- Main organ: Board of trustees
- Revenue: £24,405 (2019/20)
- Volunteers: 45
- Website: whgt.wales

The Welsh Historic Gardens Trust is a charity and membership organisation for heritage conservation. Established in 1989, the trust exists to support the conservation of historic parks and gardens in Wales.

== History and activity ==
The Welsh Historic Gardens Trust was established in 1989, gaining charitable status in 1994. Its objectives are to raise awareness and appreciation of historic landscapes within Wales and to support their conservation through advice, guidance and research. The trust is based at Aberglasney House, a historic estate in Carmarthenshire in west Wales, and is led by a board of trustees, supported by volunteers. These are organised through its nine county branches. The trust publishes a newsletter, and organises an annual programme of visits to important Welsh parks and gardens.

The 20st century saw an increased understanding of the cultural importance of landscape. In her study, The Historic Gardens of Wales, published in 1992, Elisabeth Whittle, later president of the WHGT, wrote, "historic parks and gardens are an integral part of the Welsh archaeological and architectural heritage." (Note: When Elisabeth Whittle wrote The Historic Gardens of Wales in 1992, the establishment of a register of historic parks and gardens in Wales had just begun. It was a further thirty years before the register gained statutory effect.) The trust acts as an amenity society, and is routinely consulted by Cadw, the historic environment service for Wales, on issues relating to the recording and preservation of historic parks and gardens. The importance of this work increased when Cadw was given statutory responsibility for the creation and maintenance of the Cadw/ICOMOS Register of Parks and Gardens of Special Historic Interest in Wales which gained legal status in February 2022.

== Sources ==
- Cadw (2017). Managing Change to Registered Historic Parks and Gardens in Wales (PDF). Cardiff: Cadw.
- Reader, Jean (2010). Inquiry into the Welsh Government's Historic Environment Policy (PDF). WHGT.
- Whittle, Elisabeth (1992). The Historic Gardens of Wales. Cardiff: CADW. ISBN 9780117015784.
