= John Rolls, 2nd Baron Llangattock =

British barrister and army Major

The Lord Llangattock
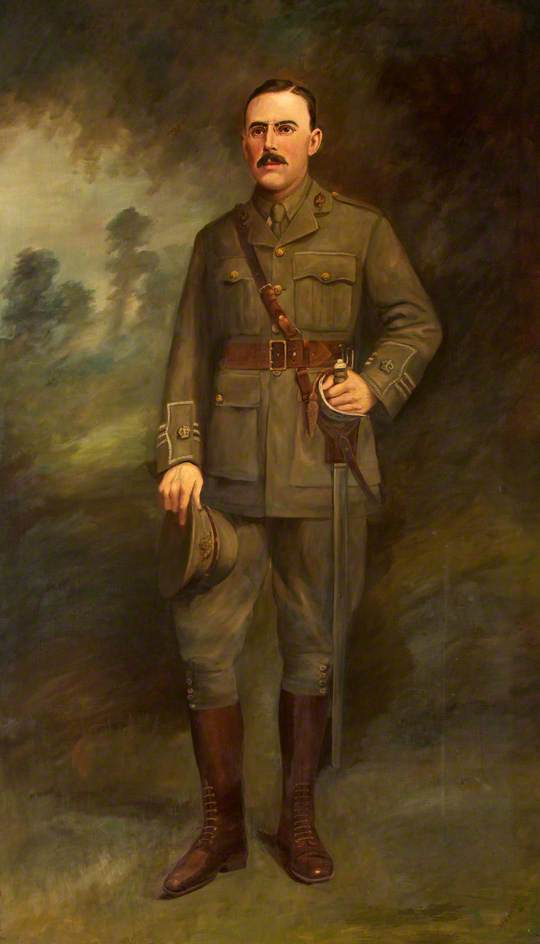
- in uniform
- Born: 25 April 1870; London, England
- Died: 31 October 1916 (aged 46); Boulogne, France
- Cause of death: Killed in action
- Education: Christ Church, Oxford

Arms of Rolls of The Hendre, near Monmouth, Barons Llangattock: Or, on a fesse dancettée with plain cotises between three billets sable each charged with a lion rampant of the field, as many bezants. Motto: Celeritas et veritas.

John Maclean Rolls, 2nd Baron Llangattock (25 April 1870 – 31 October 1916) was a British barrister and army Major.

== Biography ==
Rolls was son of John Rolls, 1st Baron Llangattock, and his wife Georgiana Marcia Maclean. He was born in London, but his family home, The Hendre, was near Monmouth. When Rolls reached the age of 21 his family gave the town a building to use as a gymnasium. Rolls was educated at Christ Church, Oxford, graduating B.A. in 1893 and M.A in 1896.

He was a barrister of the Inner Temple, London, and served for many years with the 1st Monmouth Volunteer Artillery, retiring with the rank of captain and honorary major. In January 1915 he joined the Royal Field Artillery.

In 1900 he was High Sheriff of Monmouthshire, and Mayor in 1906–07. He was also a JP and deputy lieutenant and county councillor for Monmouthshire.

He died on 31 October 1916, aged 46, from wounds received at the Battle of the Somme while serving as a major with the 1st Monmouthshire Bty Royal Field Artillery. He is buried at Boulogne Eastern Cemetery in France.

He never married; his younger brother Henry Allan Rolls, who was heir presumptive, had died four months previously, and his youngest brother, Charles Rolls of Rolls-Royce fame, had died 6 years earlier; thus the title became extinct.

Baron Llangattock's estate was valued at more than £1.1 million. His sister Eleanor Shelley-Rolls was the main beneficiary, and he bequeathed £100,000 to the Archdeaconry of Monmouth. Upon his death The Hendre estate passed first to his sister, Eleanor (who died without issue), and finally through his aunt, Patricia Harding (née Rolls), to his first cousin, John Reginald Harding, whose descendants bear the surname Harding-Rolls.

== Family tree ==
John Rolls (1735–1801)	Sarah Coysh (d. 1801)
John Rolls of The Hendre (1776–1837)	Martha
John Etherington Welch Rolls (1807–70)	Elizabeth Mary Long
John Allan Rolls (1837–1912)	Georgiana Marcia Maclean (1837 – 1923)
John Maclean Rolls (1870–1916)	Henry Alan Rolls (1871–1916)	Eleanor Georgiana Rolls (1872–1961)	Charles Stewart Rolls (1877–1910) (co-founder of Rolls-Royce)

Peerage of the United Kingdom
Preceded by John Rolls	Baron Llangattock; 1912–1916	Extinct
