= Chippenham Mead =

Town green in Monmouth, Wales

- Chippenham Park; Chippenham Fields; Chippenham Gate
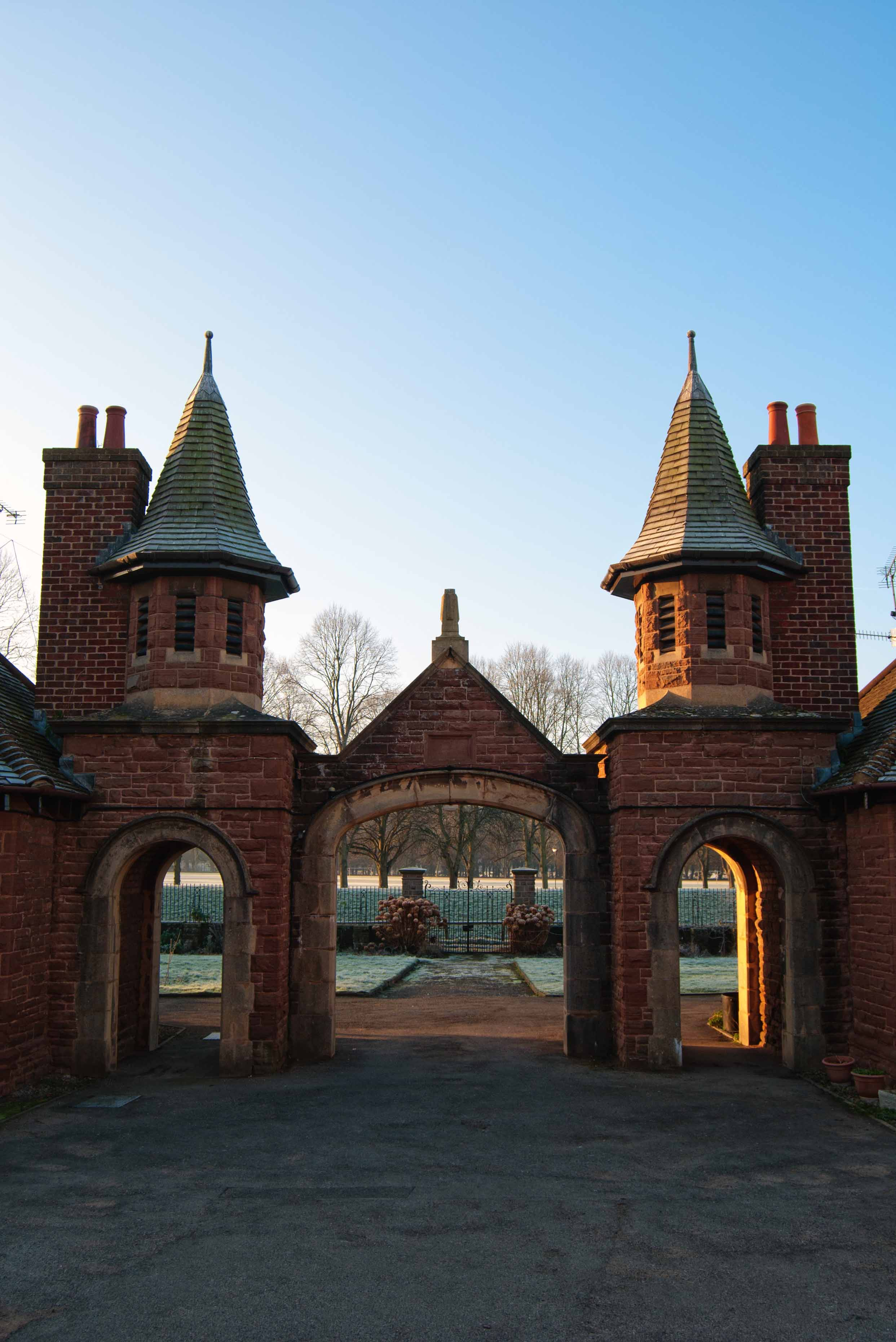
- Former Entrance to Chippenham Mead
- Interactive map of Chippenham Mead
- Location: Monmouth, Wales
- Coordinates: 51.808721°N 2.715316°W

Chippenham Mead is a town green in Monmouth, Wales. The meadow is registered common land and is situated between Blestium Street and the River Wye, intersected by the A40(T) Monmouth bypass. Within the park lies a sports area called Chippenham Sports Ground. The meadow is listed at Grade II on the Cadw/ICOMOS Register of Parks and Gardens of Special Historic Interest in Wales.

== History ==
The mead has also been known as Chippenham Fields, Chippenham Park, Chippenham Gate and Monmouth Sports Ground. Between 1734 and 1893, Chippenham was used annually for horse racing. Sometime between 1893 and 1900, the racing moved to Vauxhall Fields, where it ended in 1933. This brought an end to almost 200 years of racing in Monmouth. Early race cards from newspapers, such as the London Evening Post refer to the course as Chippenham Mead. Initially, the event spanned five days but was later reduced to a two-day event by 1880. For example, the Monmouth races held on September 22 and 23 in 1870, and were a regular two-day annual event in the late 1860s and early 1870s,. The Great Western Railway often advertised "CHEAP RETURN TICKETS" for the special event.

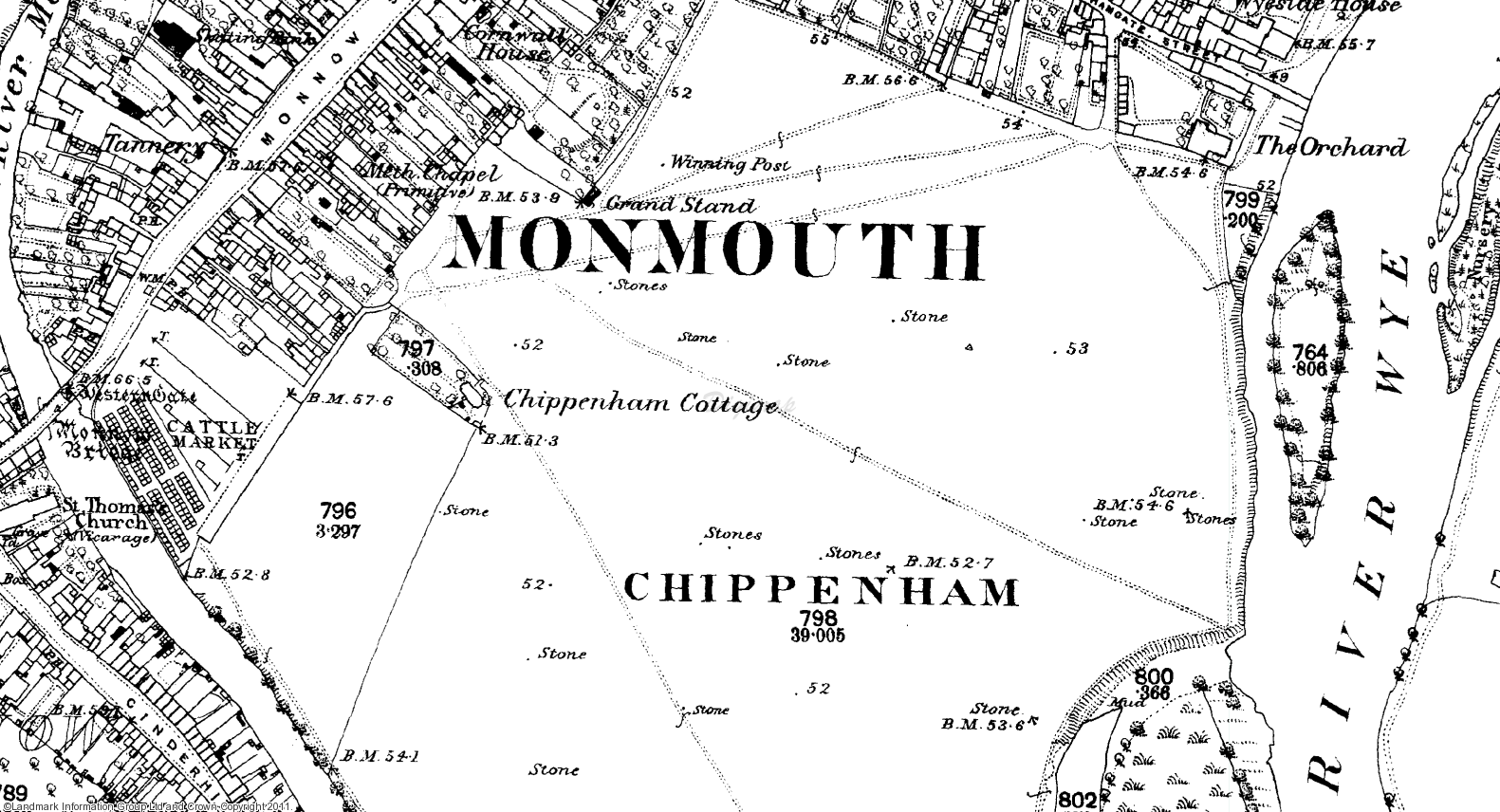
1880 OS map showing the Winning Post and grandstand locations

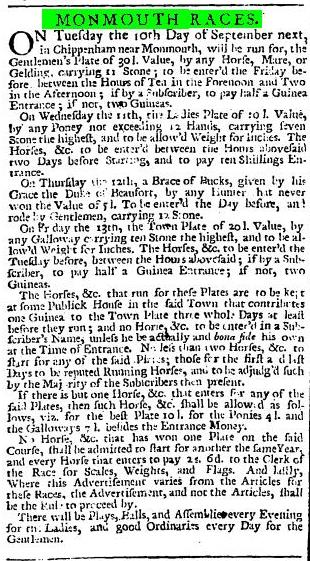
Monmouth Races 1734

Between 1876 and 1880, the race meet did not take place. On Tuesday 28 September 1880, the races returned. The Western Mail newspaper of 31 July 1880 heralded the return of Monmouth races and claimed that "Monmouth races were among the oldest in England, for in the Calender [sic?] printed by order of his Most Gracious Majesty dated 1739, we find two days good racing accounted for at the town of Monmouth".

In 1925, a single engined Avro 504K bi-plane registered as G-EATB crashed landed on Chippenham Mead. The circumstances surrounding the incident are not known.

In 2022, Chippenham Mead was designated Grade II on the Cadw/ICOMOS Register of Parks and Gardens of Special Historic Interest in Wales.

== Current usage ==
Chippenham Sports Ground, also known as Little Chippenham, is run by Monmouth Sports Association and is made up of and used by Monmouth Tennis Club, Monmouth Bowls Club and bowling green, Monmouth Cricket Club, Monmouth Rugby Football Club and Monmouth Town F.C., known as The Kingfishers. It is the Welsh base for Cricketers with a Disability.

In 2021 a new children's play area was opened on the mead, and the old site, closer to the dual carriageway, was returned to grassland.

== Gallery ==
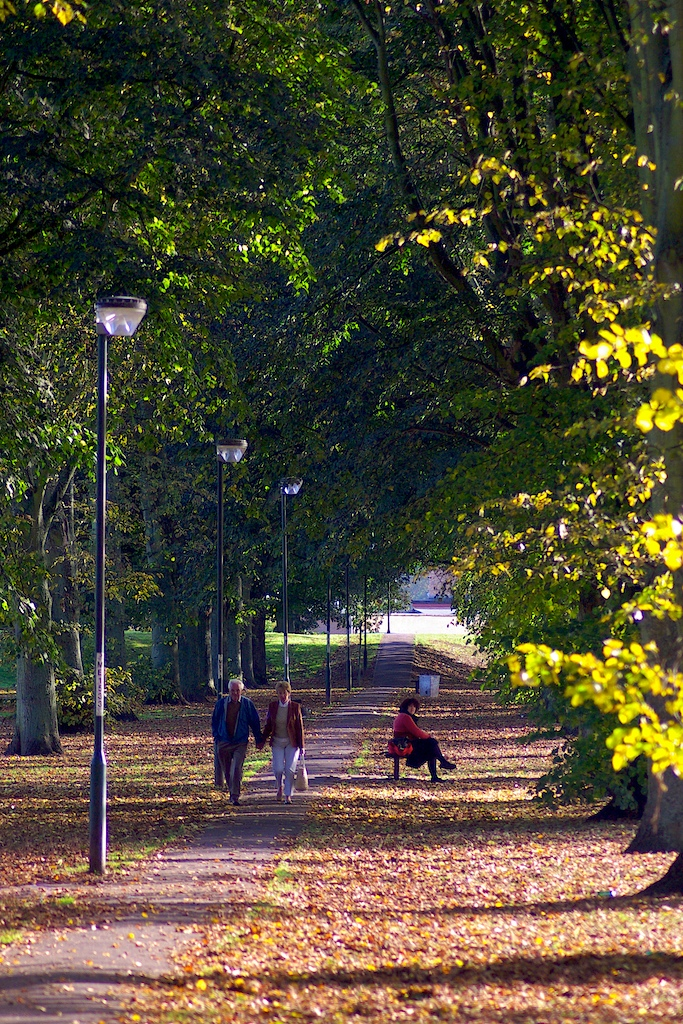
Chippenham Park

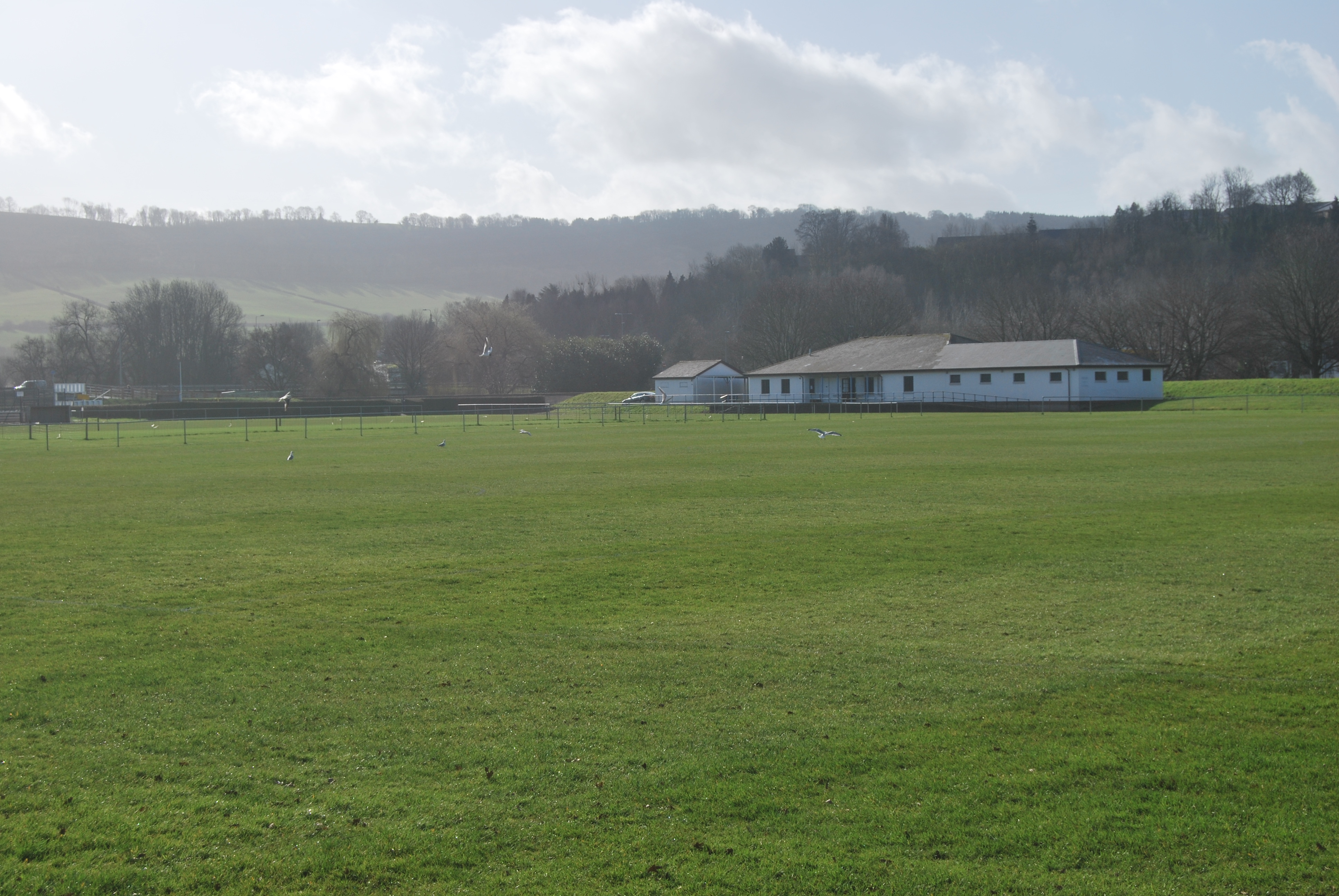
Sports Ground field and club house, with the bowling green to the left

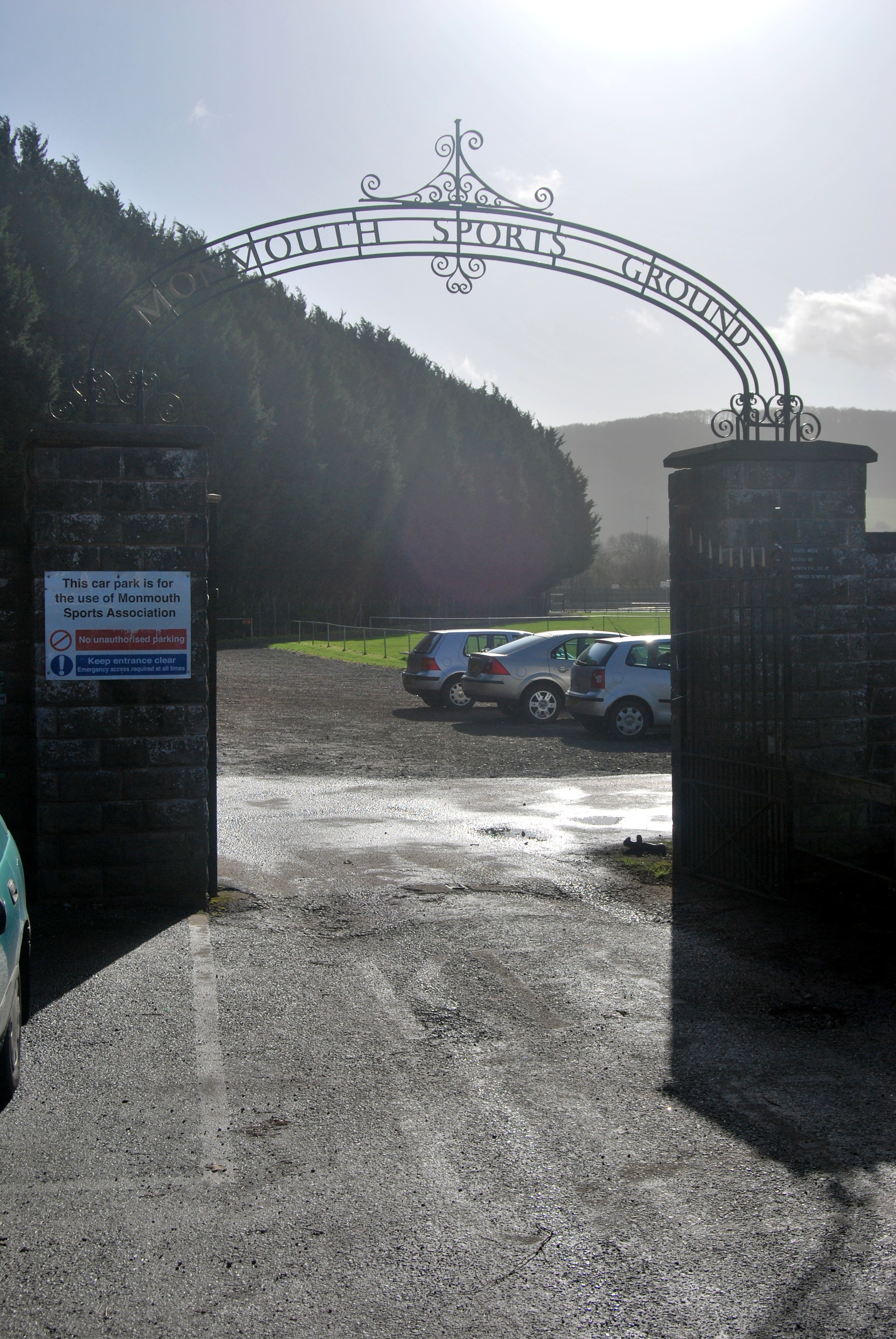
Chippenham Sports Ground field entrance

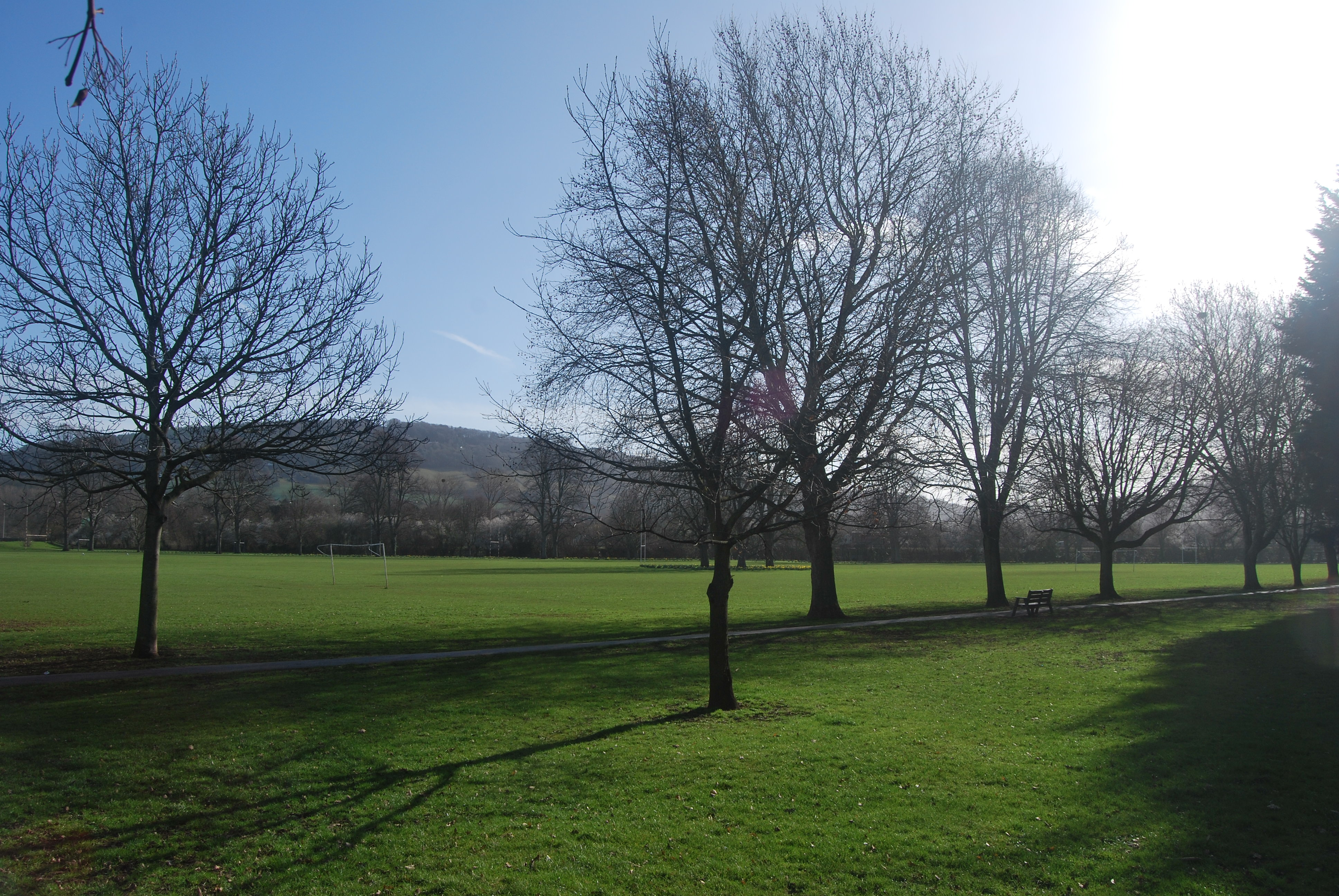
Chippenham Park used for Rugby and recreation

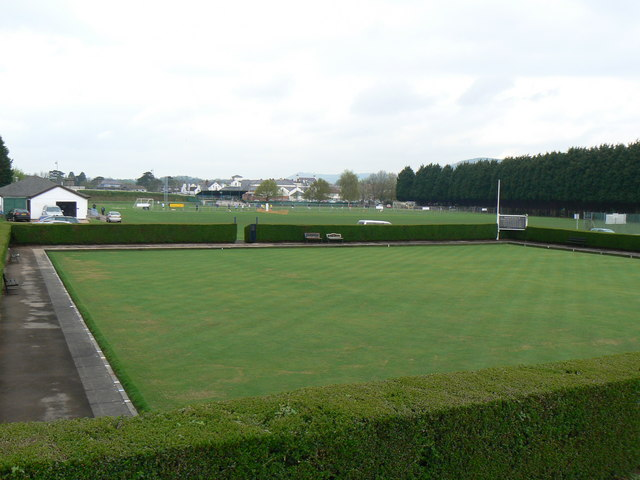
The bowling green at the Sports Ground
