= Swiss Cottage, Rockfield =

Swiss Cottage
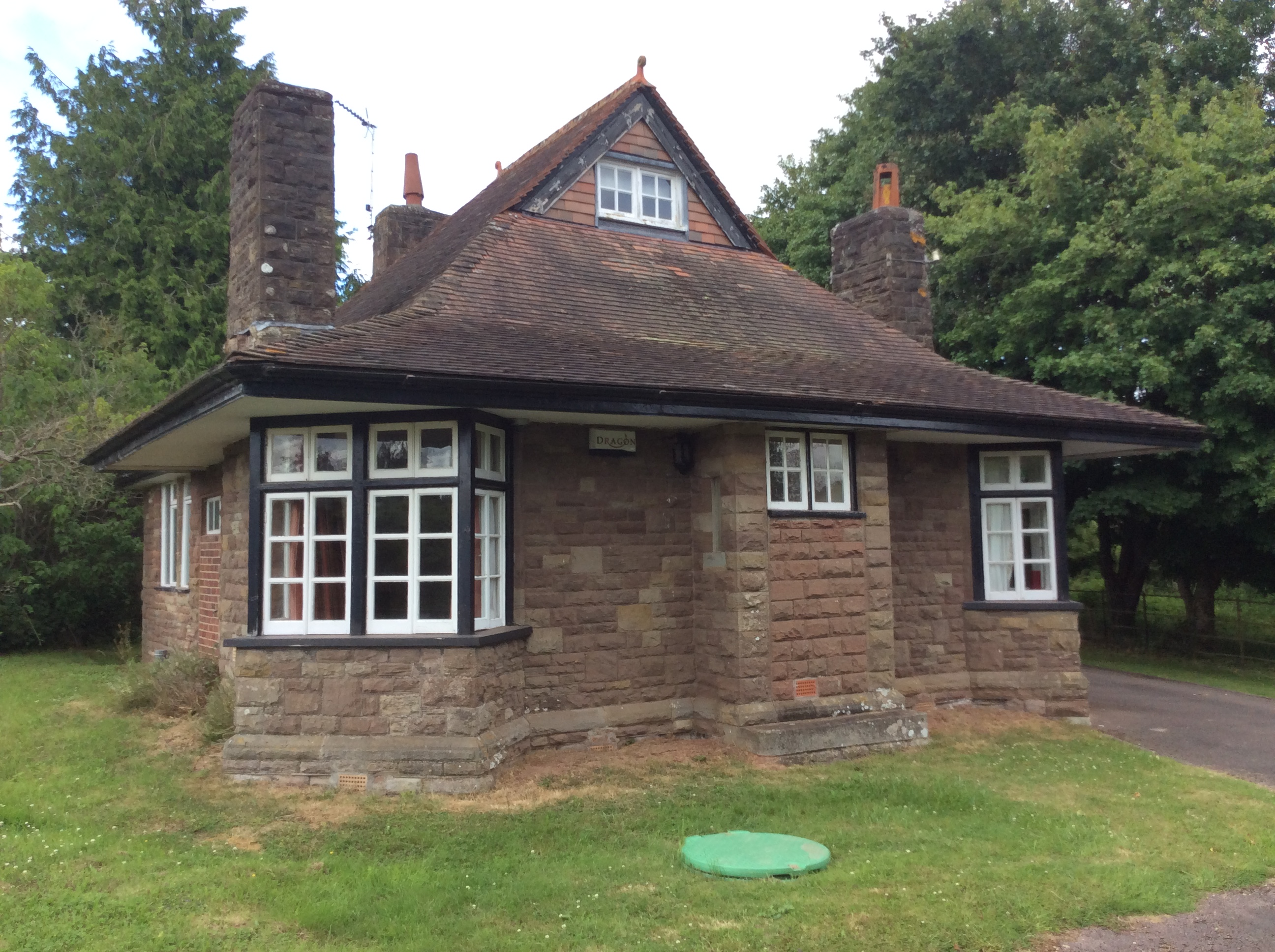
- "...not particularly Swiss"

- Location within Monmouthshire
- 51.8255°N 2.7546°W
- Type: Gatehouse
- Location: Rockfield, Monmouthshire

History
- Built: 1905

Site notes
- Architect: Aston Webb
- Architectural style: Arts and Crafts
- Governing body: Privately owned

Listed Building – Grade II*
- Official name: Swiss Cottage, Llangattock-vibon-Avel
- Designated: 3 September 1991
- Reference no.: 2857

The Swiss Cottage, Rockfield, Monmouthshire is a gatehouse to The Hendre estate and was designed by Sir Aston Webb in 1905. It is a Grade II* listed building.

== History and description ==
The Hendre was the country home of the Rolls family since the 18th century and, as the fortunes of the family rose, was subject to three major expansions in the 19th and 20th centuries, to the designs of George Vaughan Maddox, then Thomas Henry Wyatt, and finally Aston Webb. Webb constructed the Cedar Library at the main mansion in the very late 19th century and in 1905 designed the Swiss Cottage. It formed a terminal point on the “3-mile Drive” constructed by Lord Llangattock, and designed by Henry Ernest Milner.

The cottage is single-storeyed, with a dormer above, and is constructed of old red sandstone. The roof is hipped and pierced at either end with large chimneystacks. The interior contains an inglenook fireplace. Cadw notes influences from Lutyens and Voysey, while the Royal Commission on the Ancient and Historical Monuments of Wales considers it "an inspired and unusually distinctive symmetrical Arts-and-Crafts design". The architectural historian John Newman described Swiss Cottage as "a sweet little thing but not particularly Swiss".
