= Rockfield, Monmouthshire =

Village in Monmouthshire, Wales

Coordinates: 51.83030°N 2.7539°W

Rockfield
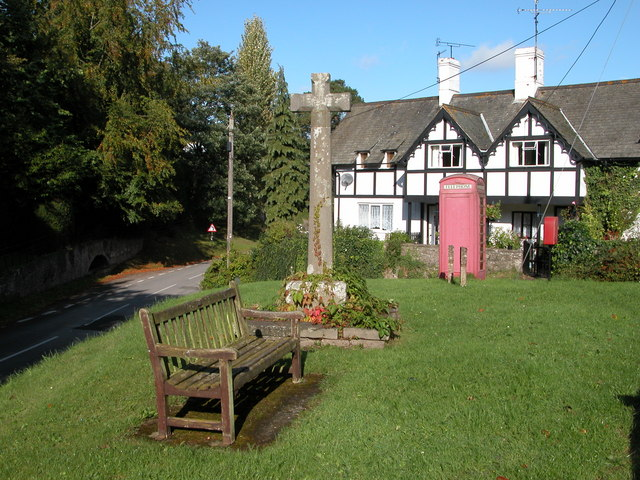
- Rockfield village green and war memorial

- Location within Monmouthshire
- OS grid reference: SO482149
- Community: Whitecastle
- Principal area: Monmouthshire
- Preserved county: Gwent
- Country: Wales
- Sovereign state: United Kingdom
- Post town: MONMOUTH
- Postcode district: NP25
- Dialling code: 01600
- Police: Gwent
- Fire: South Wales
- Ambulance: Welsh
- UK Parliament: Monmouth

Rockfield (unofficial Welsh: Llanoronwy) is a small village in the community of Whitecastle, Monmouthshire, Southeast Wales. It is located beside the River Monnow, about 3.2 kilometres (2.0 mi) north-west of Monmouth, at the junction of the B4233 to Abergavenny and the B4347 to Grosmont. Rockfield Studios is situated just south of the village.

== Placename ==
The Welsh name Llanoronwy Carn Cenhedlon suggests that a Llan or Celtic Christian community (linked to Saint Cenedlon) existed in the village during the early middle ages and is possibly recorded under this name in the twelfth century Book of Llandaff. While the English name Rockfield was first documented in 1639, it is believed that the name derives from the Norman-French "Rocheville", as following the Norman invasion of Wales in the late 11th century, a Ralph de Rocheville is recorded as living in the area.

When bilingual signage was introduced by Monmouthshire County Council highways department in 2004, the villages name was given as Rockfield and Llanoronwy. A campaign was launched to have the Welsh name removed with the Welsh Language Board and a Welsh-speaking local councillor being blamed for the changes. However, the Welsh Language Board would publicly support the removal of the Welsh name, stating that the name clashed with the board's guideline to avoid "pedantic or revived antiquarian forms and literal or whimsical translations" that have not been in common use. Llangattock-Vibon-Avel community council also called for the signage to be removed, stating that "there is no need" to revive the Welsh name.

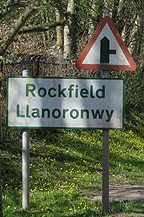
Bilingual road sign erected by Monmouthshire County Council in 2004. They were removed in 2011, following a campaign against the use of the Welsh name Llanoronwy.

In 2011, the county council agreed to reverse its decision on the Welsh name. However, this reversal has itself been heavily criticised by both locals and national groups. Stephen Clarke, the chairman and founding member of Monmouth Archaeological Society argued that while many of the road signs in Monmouthshire already included Welsh translations of English and Norman names, "Llanoronwy is an original place-name - and a very ancient one at that." In a letter to the Monmouthshire Beacon, the Monmouth historian David Hancocks questioned the argument for removing the Welsh name on the grounds that some found the name "offensive" and stated that Llanoronwy is "the proven Welsh name for the church and village for over a thousand years". Bethan Williams, the chair of the Welsh language pressure group Cymdeithas yr Iaith Gymraeg criticised the Welsh Language Board specifically, calling their decision a "big step backwards".

== Church of St Cenedlon ==
The village church is dedicated to an early Welsh saint, Cenedlon, who may have been the wife of Arthfael ab Ithel, king of Gwent in the 7th century. Some old sources show it as being also dedicated to Saint Kenelm, a 9th-century Mercian martyr. However, the Welsh name Llanoronwy appears to derive from a third name, Goronwy.

The church tower is mediaeval, but the rest of the church was rebuilt and refitted in 1859–60 by John Prichard and John Pollard Seddon in the Early English and Perpendicular styles. It contains a painted coat of arms of William III, dated 1700.

It also contains, beneath the altar, the grave of Bishop Matthew Pritchard, the Catholic Vicar Apostolic of the Western District between 1713 and 1744. In retirement, he lived with a Catholic family in a mediaeval mansion, Perthîr, beside the river; the house was demolished around 1830. The village falls under the parish of Llangattock-Vibon-Avel.

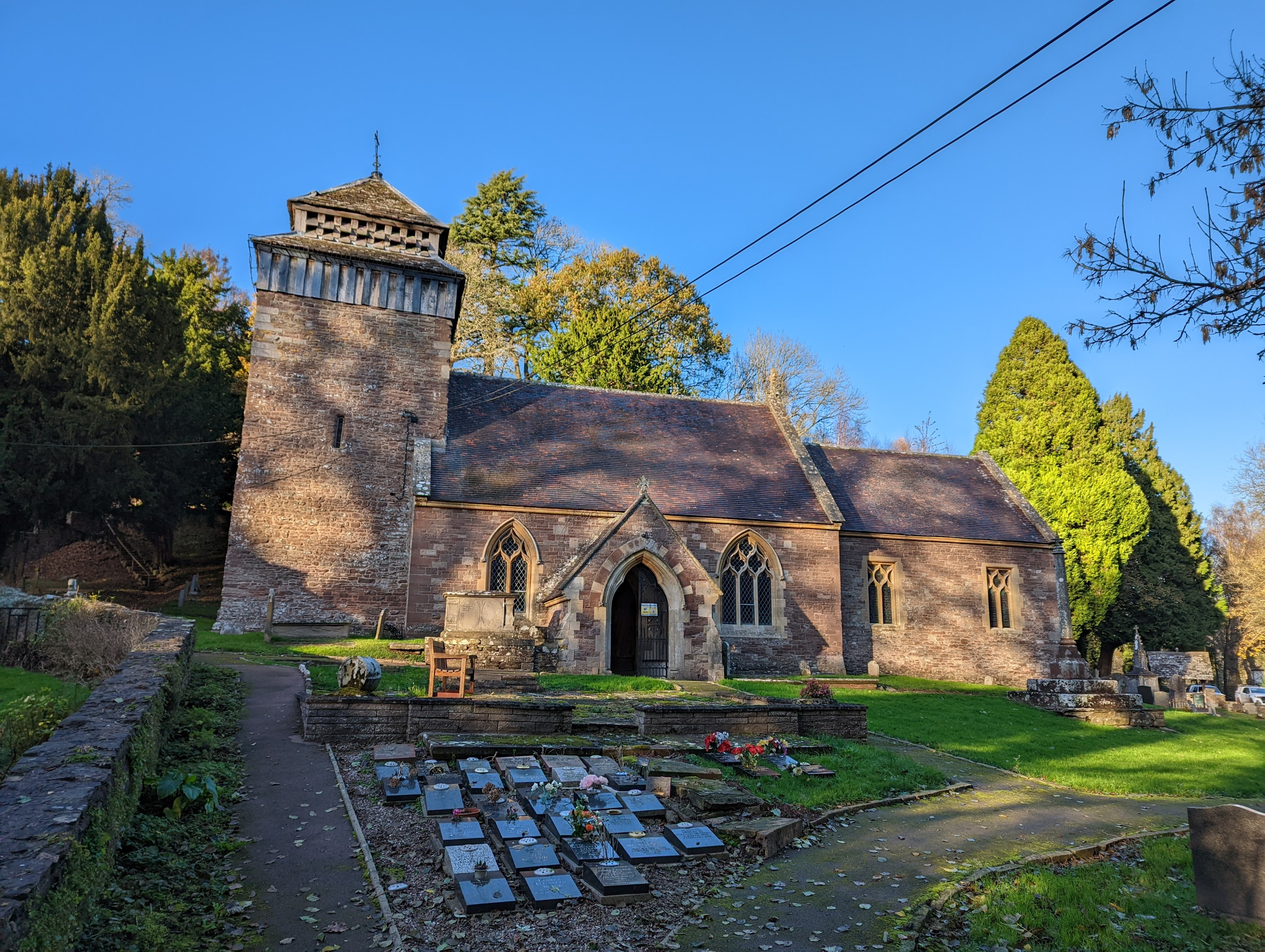

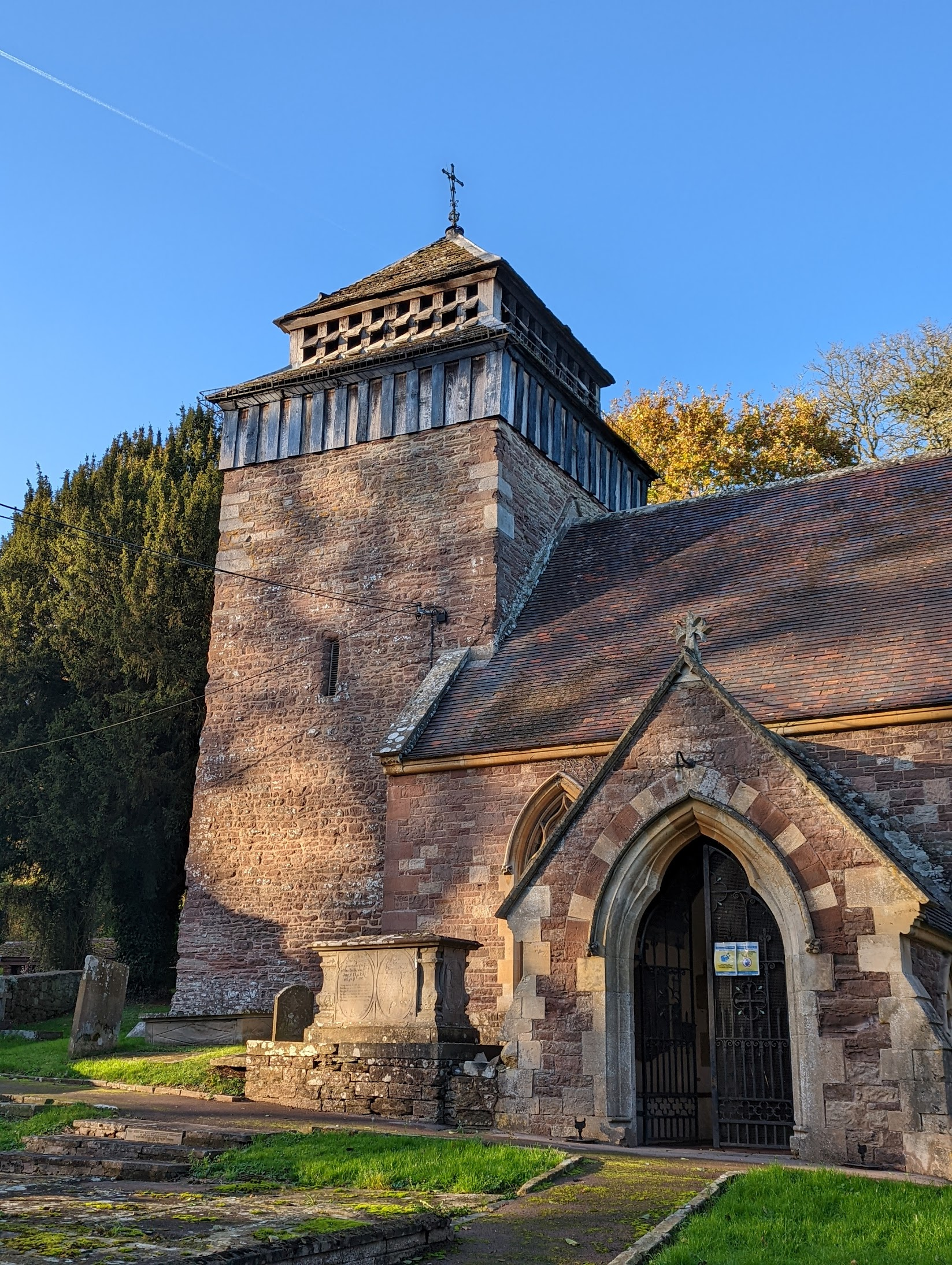

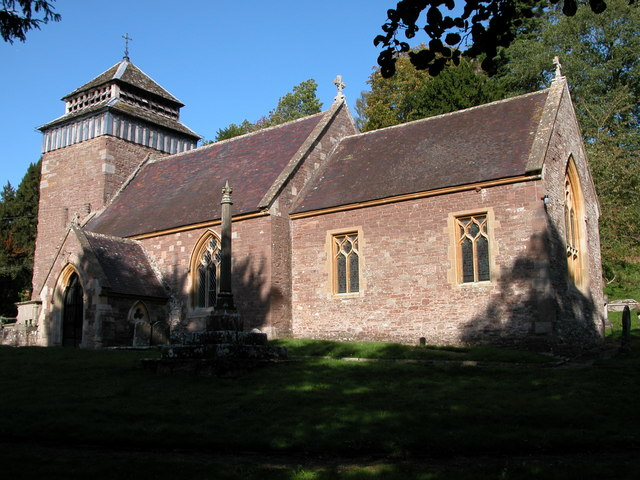

== Notable buildings ==
The village is known globally as the home of two famous residential recording studios, Rockfield Studios, which is located to the south of the village and Monnow Valley Studio to the North East.

The village is the home to the Rolls family estate, The Hendre (English: The Old Village) and several extant buildings in and around the village were constructed under John Etherington Welch Rolls. One of the entrance lodges to The Hendre, 3.2 kilometres (2.0 mi) to the west, is sited immediately north of the village. Almshouses, provided in 1906 by John Rolls, 1st Baron Llangattock for retired estate workers, are located beside the main road south of the village. They were designed by Aston Webb and built in the local Old Red Sandstone with half-timbers. To the north of the village, Pentwyn is a house designed and occupied from 1837 by the Monmouth architect George Vaughan Maddox, and later extended as a parsonage.

== Gallery ==
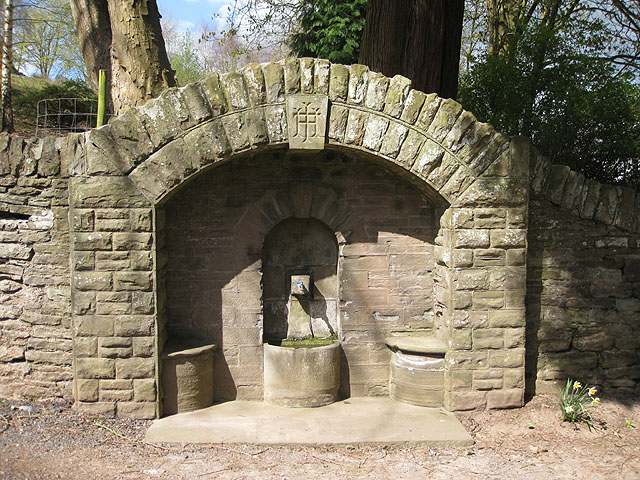
Village Well

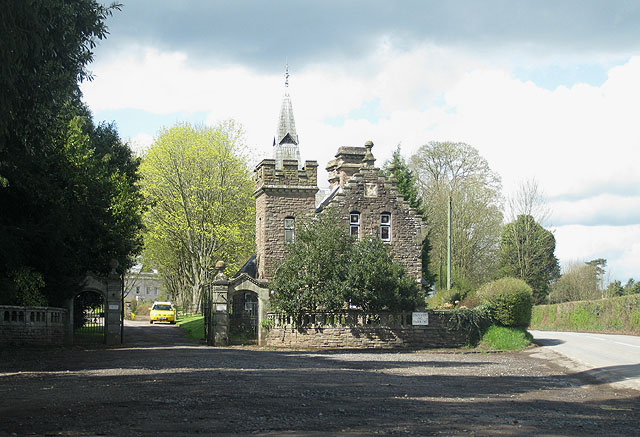
Gateway at Rockfield leading to The Hendre

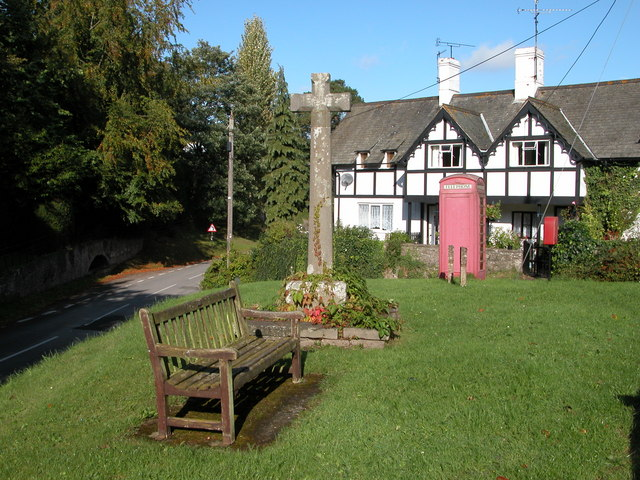
The war memorial
