= Coysh =

Coysh is a surname. Notable people with the surname include:

- John Coysh (fl. 17th century), English actor
- Sarah Coysh (c. 1742 – 1801), British heiress
