= Monmouthshire Show =

Welsh agricultural show

Coordinates: 51.803°N 2.701°W

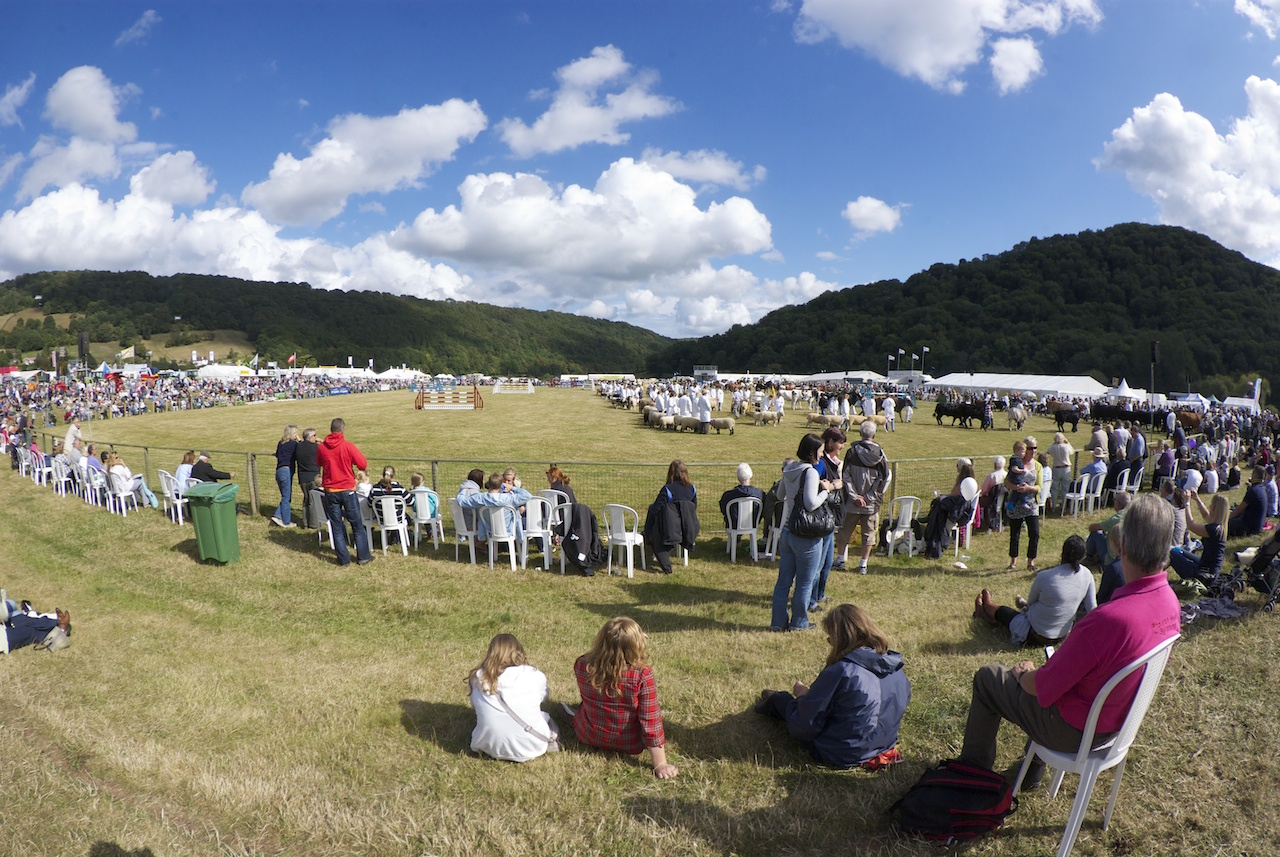
Show ground in 2011

The Monmouthshire Show is a one-day agricultural show in Wales, taking place annually in Monmouth on the 3rd Sunday in August. Historically it is the largest one-day agricultural show in Wales.

== Origin ==
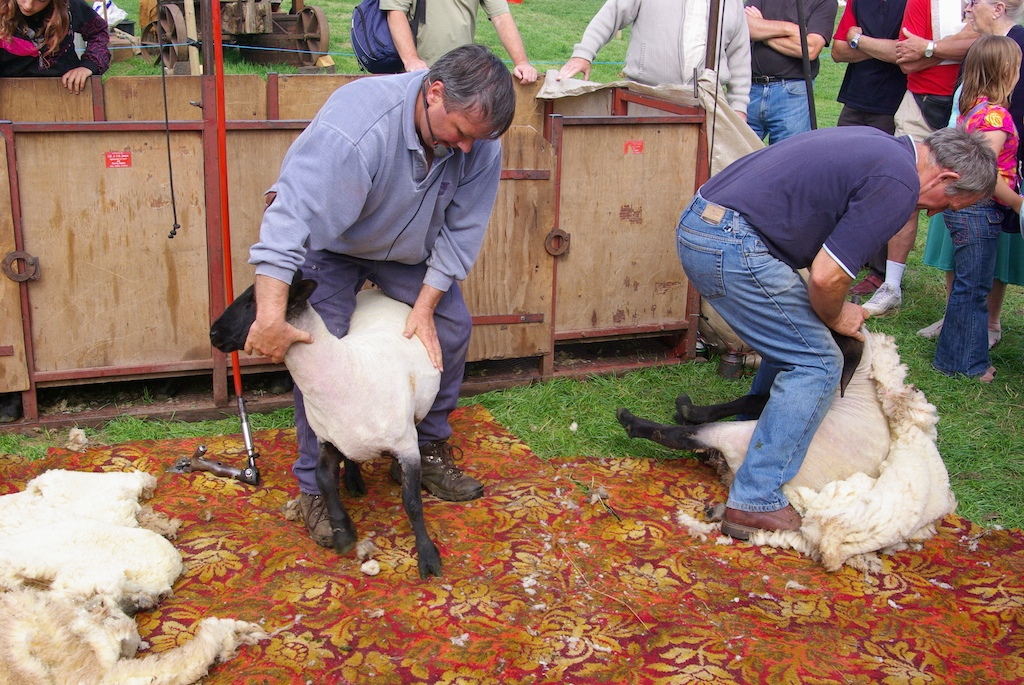
Sheep shearing at the showground

The origin of the show dates back to the 1790s when Monmouth's agricultural society organised ploughing matches. However, it was not until 1857 that it was proposed that a cattle show should be created. On 30 May 1857, the eighth Duke of Beaufort gave ten pounds and John Rolls placed twenty pounds into a fund to start the Monmouth Cattle Show. The show was first staged in the October of the same year. Rolls was President of the show for his lifetime and he was succeeded by his son John Allan Rolls in 1870.

== Venues ==
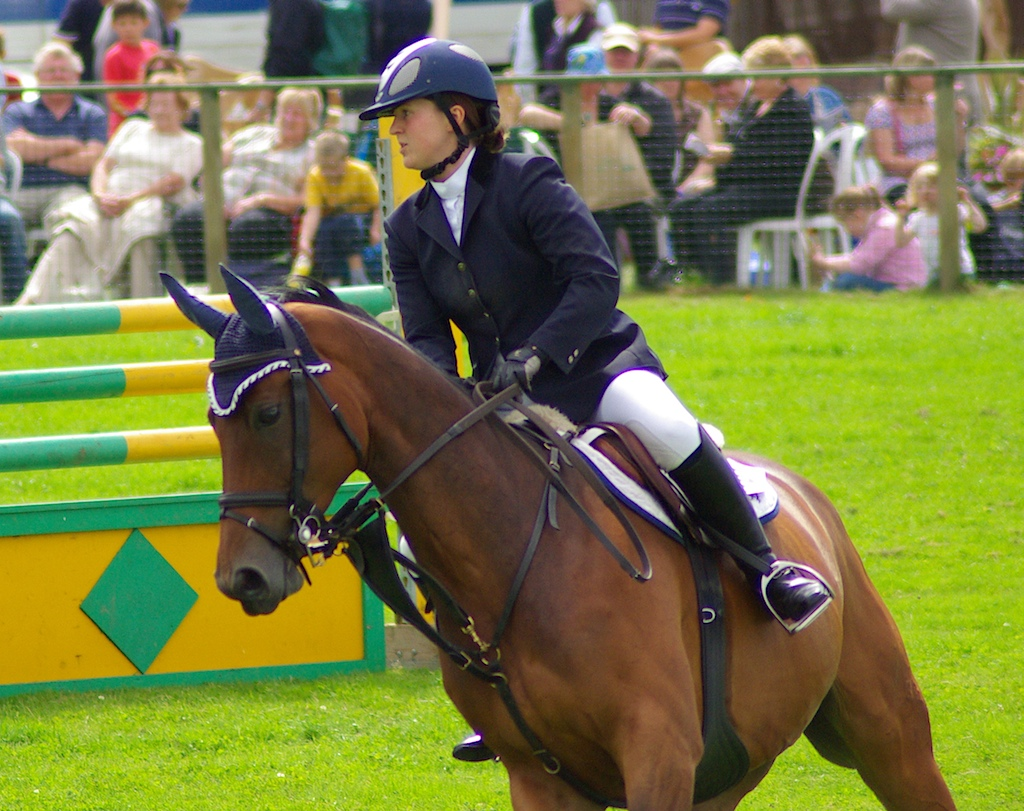
Cornering at Monmouth Show

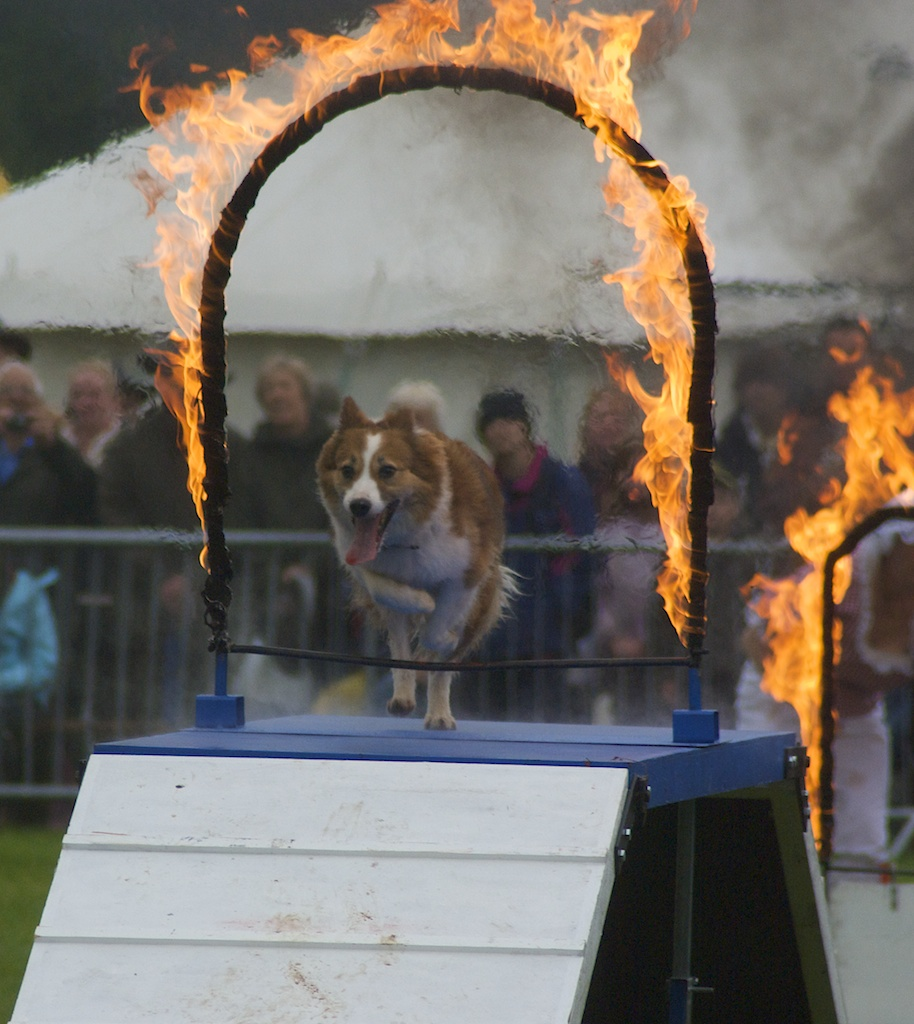
Dog agility and obedience trials

In 1876 the show was held in the town's newly established cattle market in Chippenham Fields. The show was then held annually (firstly in October, but then eventually moved to August – taking up its now traditional date of the last Thursday in August) up until the First World War. The show was restarted in 1919 when it was renamed the Monmouthshire County Show. The show was not held during the period of the Second World War, but from 1946 until 2006 it was held each year on the grounds of Vauxhall Fields. Nor was it held in 1956 or 2001 due to outbreaks of foot and mouth disease, nor 2020 on grounds of COVID-19 pandemic.

2007 marked the 150th anniversary of the Monmouthshire Show Society. That same year the show moved to a new site on the Redbrook Road in Monmouth.

== Date ==
When the show started it was originally held in October but it was brought forward to September to improve the likelihood of good weather. The date has now moved to the third Sunday in August (as of 2023).
