= John Rolls =

- Born: 27 February 1735; Bermondsey, Southwark, London, Surrey, England
- Died: 8 September 1801 (aged 66); Bermondsey, Southwark, London, Surrey, England
- Occupations: High Sheriff of Monmouthshire; Justice of the Peace
- Known for: The Grange, The Hendre

John Rolls (27 February 1735 – 8 September 1801) was a native of Bermondsey, Southwark, London, Surrey, England. A member of the Rolls family of The Grange in Bermondsey and The Hendre, Monmouthshire, he married heiress Sarah Coysh. That marriage was instrumental in furthering both the fortune and the social rank of the Rolls family. In addition to serving a term as High Sheriff of Monmouthshire, Rolls was a Justice of the Peace.

== Biography ==
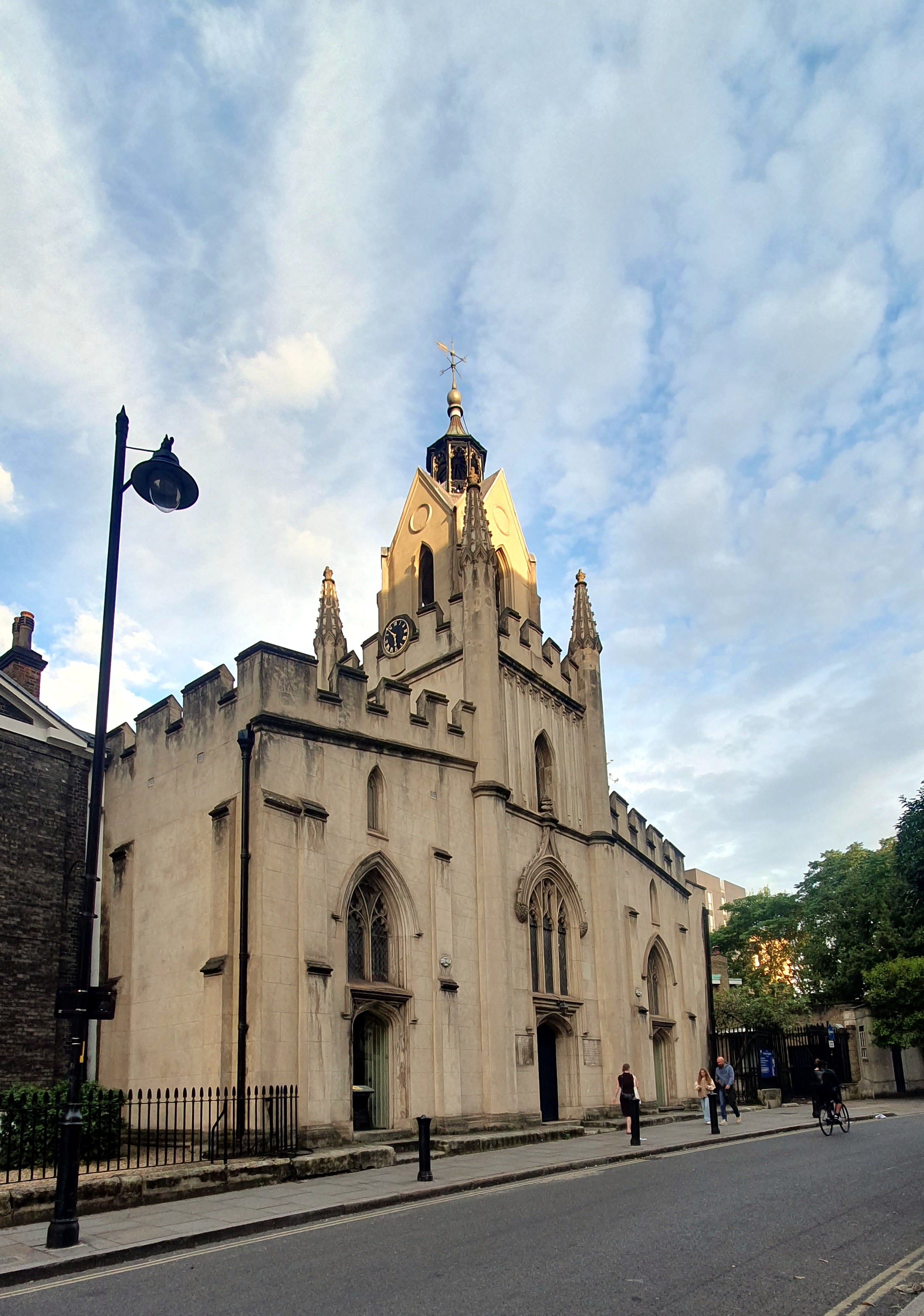
St Mary Magdalen, Bermondsey

John Rolls, son of Aaron and Elizabeth Rolls, was born on 27 February 1735 in the parish of St Mary Magdalen, Bermondsey, now in the borough of Southwark. He was baptized on 10 March 1735 at St Mary Magdalen, Bermondsey, an Anglican church. His father Aaron Rolls was a victualler and, by 1746, was at St Thomas à Watering(s) on Kent Road, which was a small bridged-crossing on the Old Kent Road named after the pilgrimage route to the shrine of saint. on that site. John Rolls had at least three siblings. His sister Mary was born on 22 February 1737 in Bermondsey, and baptized on 21 March 1737 at St Mary Magdalen. She died when she was two years old and was buried on 3 March 1739 in the churchyard of St Mary Magdalen. A second sister, Elizabeth, was born on 15 March 1742 in Bermondsey and baptized on 15 April 1742 at the parish church. She apparently died as a young child. A third sister, also named Elizabeth, was born on 23 March 1746 in Bermondsey and baptized on 23 April 1746 at St Mary Magdalen. John's father Aaron Rolls (c. 1696–1764) was buried on 19 January 1764 in the parish churchyard.

While some sources suggest that John Rolls married Sarah Coysh, second daughter of Thomas Coysh of Camberwell, Southwark, on 21 October 1767, their marriage contract was signed on 19 October 1767, and the original marriage record was dated 20 October 1767, with the ceremony performed at St Mary Magdalen. The heiress brought a substantial amount of property to the marriage, both in London and Monmouthshire. She succeeded her brother Richard Coysh to the family fortune. Eventually, she was the only heir to the estates of the Coysh, Allen, and James families. She and her sister Elizabeth were heirs to the estate of their uncle Henry Allen (1691–1767); Sarah, as the surviving sister, inherited from her uncle The Hendre estate at Llangattock-Vibon-Avel, near Monmouth, Monmouthshire. A monument commemorates Henry Allen in the chancel of St Mary's Priory Church, Monmouth.

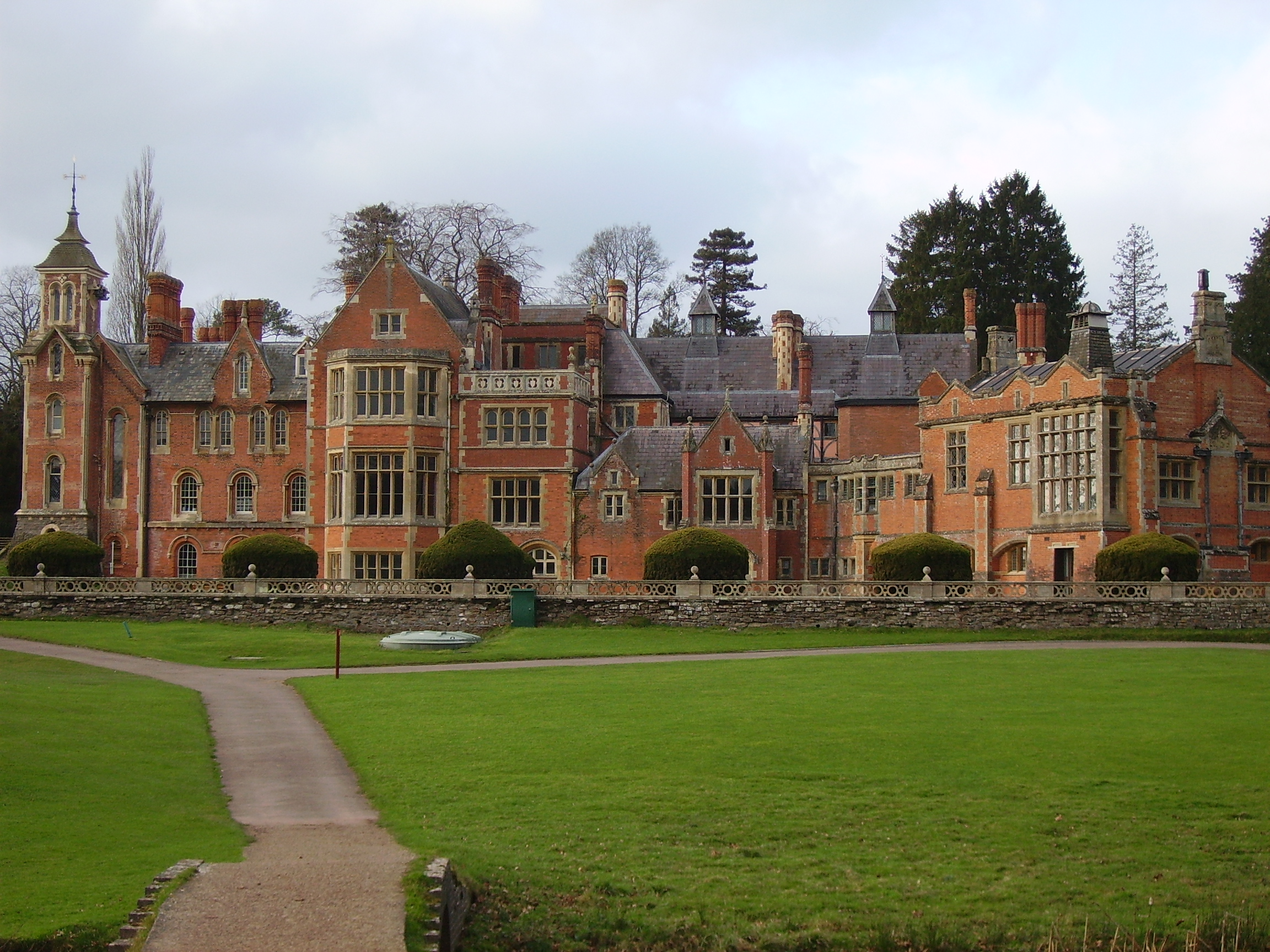
The Hendre at Llangattock-Vibon-Avel

John Rolls was a justice of the peace. In addition, he became High Sheriff of Monmouthshire in 1794, appointed by King George III. As a young man, his occupation was recorded as "cowkeeper" on his children's baptismal records. John and Sarah Rolls had at least four children: Sarah Allen, Elizabeth, Henry Allen (presumably named after Sarah's uncle) and John. Sarah Allen Rolls was born on 15 July 1768 in Bermondsey, and baptized on 2 August 1768. She married Felix Whitmore on 3 August 1793 and was buried on 13 June 1843, both at St Mary Magdalen. On 26 May 1770, her sister Elizabeth Rolls was born in Bermondsey; she was baptized on 20 June 1770. Henry Allen Rolls was born on 22 May 1772 in Bermondsey and baptized on 18 June 1772 at St Mary Magdalen. He died at the age of five and was interred in a vault in the churchyard of St Mary Magdalen on 29 July 1777. John Rolls was born on 20 October 1776 in Bermondsey and baptized on 17 November 1776, also at the parish church.

The elder John Rolls died on 8 September 1801, the day after his wife Sarah. He and his wife were buried in the churchyard of St Mary Magdalen on 15 September 1801. He was 66; she was 59. Their address was recorded as Grange Road, a reference to the family estate, The Grange. He was succeeded by his one surviving son, John Rolls (1776–1837), who initiated the first of several expansions of The Hendre in 1830. Later enlargements of The Hendre were undertaken by his grandson John Etherington Welch Rolls, and great-grandson John Allan Rolls, before and after he became Lord Llangattock. The elder John Rolls's great-great-grandson was aviation pioneer and co-founder of Rolls-Royce, Charles Stewart Rolls. Members of the Rolls family resided at The Hendre until 1987. The Hendre estate is now The Rolls of Monmouth Golf Club.

== Family tree ==
Aaron Rolls (d. 1764) | Elizabeth
John Rolls (1735–1801) | Sarah Coysh (d. 1801)
John Rolls of The Hendre (1776–1837) | Martha Maria Barnet (d. 1858)
John Etherington Welch Rolls (1807–1870) | Alexander Rolls (1818–1882) | Martha Sarah Rolls (1804–1887) | Jessy Rolls (1809–1842) | Louisa Elizabeth Rolls (1810–1853)
