= The Hendre =

Historic country house in Monmouthshire, Wales

- Yr Hendre (Welsh)
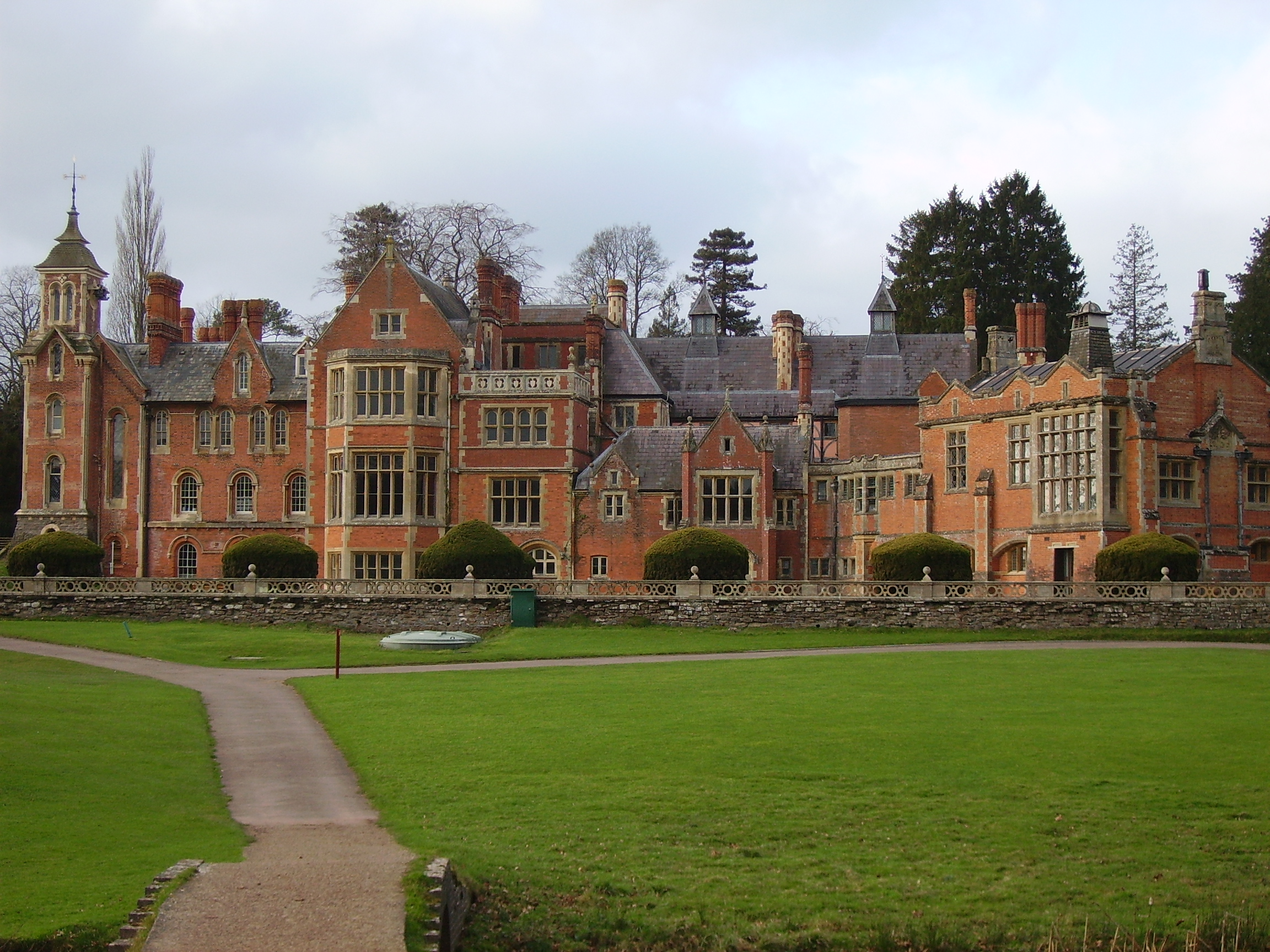
- "a striking Victorian country-house, the eclecticism of its architectur(e) reflecting its complex history"

- Location within Monmouthshire
- 51.8231°N 2.7868°W
- Type: House
- Location: Llangattock-Vibon-Avel, Monmouthshire, Wales

History
- Built: 18th and 19th centuries

Site notes
- Architect(s): George Vaughan Maddox, Thomas Henry Wyatt, Aston Webb
- Architectural style: Victorian Gothic
- Governing body: golf club

Listed Building – Grade II*
- Official name: The Hendre
- Designated: 11 April 1985
- Reference no.: 2773

Listed Building – Grade II
- Official name: Garden pond with fountain in former rose garden at The Hendre
- Designated: 19 March 2001
- Reference no.: 25061

Listed Building – Grade II
- Official name: Ornamental bridge in the grounds of The Hendre
- Designated: 19 March 2001
- Reference no.: 25058

Listed Building – Grade II
- Official name: Garden pavilion, raised terrace and screen wall to former rose garden to east and south of The Hendre
- Designated: 19 March 2001
- Reference no.: 25028

Cadw/ICOMOS Register of Parks and Gardens of Special Historic Interest in Wales
- Official name: The Hendre
- Designated: 1 February 2022
- Reference no.: PGW(Gt)17(Mon)
- Listing: Grade II*

The Hendre, (Welsh: Yr Hendre a farmer's winter residence; literally meaning old home) in Rockfield, is the only full-scale Victorian country house in the county of Monmouthshire, Wales. The ancestral estate of the Rolls family, it was the childhood home of Charles Rolls, the motoring and aviation pioneer and the co-founder of Rolls-Royce. Constructed in the Victorian Gothic style, the house was developed by three major architects, George Vaughan Maddox, Thomas Henry Wyatt and Sir Aston Webb. It is located in the civil parish of Llangattock-Vibon-Avel, some 4 miles (6.4 km) north-west of the town of Monmouth. Built in the eighteenth century as a shooting box, it was vastly expanded by the Rolls family in three stages during the nineteenth century. The house is Grade II* listed and is now the clubhouse of the Rolls of Monmouth Golf Club. The gardens and landscape park, mainly laid out by Henry Ernest Milner in the later 19th century, are designated Grade II* on the Cadw/ICOMOS Register of Parks and Gardens of Special Historic Interest in Wales.

== Etymology ==
The Welsh word hendre derives from the Welsh words hen (meaning "old") and dre (meaning "farmstead"). The designation reflects the old Welsh custom of having two residences: one down in the valley, which was used in winter (hendre), and the other homestead in the uplands, where the family would live over the summer (hafod, haf being the Welsh word for "summer".

== Rolls family ==
The ascent of the Rolls family to the aristocracy, and to the fortune used to develop the Hendre as a fine Victorian country house in Monmouthshire, was through marriage. James James of the parish of Llanvihangel-Ystern-Llewern, Monmouthshire, settled in London and acquired a valuable estate in Southwark, Surrey.

He purchased several farms and parcels of land in Llanvihangel-Ystern-Llewern and Llangattock-Vibon-Avel between 1639 and 1648. In his will published in 1677, he left his estate to his only surviving child, Sarah, who was the wife of Dr Elisha Coysh, a physician from London. Their daughter married William Allen, who also bought land in Monmouthshire. William Allen's daughter and heir married her cousin Thomas Coysh. They were succeeded by their son Richard Coysh, who was succeeded by his sister Sarah (d. 1801), the eventual sole heir of the families of Coysh, Allen and James. Sarah married John Rolls (1735–1801) of the Grange, Bermondsey, and of the Hendre, Monmouthshire, Sheriff of Monmouthshire 1794, bringing him much property both in Monmouthshire and London.

John Rolls died the day after his wife. He was succeeded by his son John Rolls (1776–1837) of the Hendre, who was succeeded by his son John Etherington Welch Rolls (1807–70), Sheriff of Monmouthshire 1842 (married Elizabeth Mary Long, granddaughter of William Carnegie, 7th Earl of Northesk). He was succeeded by his son John Allan Rolls (1837–1912), sheriff in 1875 and MP for Monmouthshire, 1880–1885, created Baron Llangattock of the Hendre, 1892. John Allan Rolls's ennoblement brought the family, and the house, to its social apogee, culminating in a visit from the Duke and Duchess of York (later King George V and Queen Mary), who stayed with Lord and Lady Llangattock at the Hendre in late October – early November 1900. The Duke and Duchess were taken on motor car excursions by Charles Rolls, probably the first time that the royal couple had been in a car. This was an important event in the family's social history, confirming their elevation to the upper echelons of society.

Of John Allan's four children, the most famous was Charles, the co-founder of Rolls-Royce. As well as his interests in cars and aeroplanes, Charles was a keen balloonist, the magazine Flight of January 1909 recording a flight from Monmouth.

Ballooning Home – On Saturday last the Hon. C. S. Rolls gave an exhibition of the possibilities of ballooning by taking his mother, Lady Llangattock, home by balloon. The ascent was made at Monmouth in the balloon Mercury, the occupants of the basket being Lady Llangattock, Hon. C. S. Rolls, Hon. Mrs. Assheton – Harbord, Mr. Claud Crompton, and Mr. Charles Freeman, and the balloon landed on the lawn in front of Lord Llangattock's house, The Hendre."

— Flight Magazine, 2 January 1909.

In July 1910, Charles Rolls was killed when his Wright Flyer aircraft crashed during a flying display near Bournemouth, the first Briton to be killed in an aeronautical accident with a powered aircraft.

Lord Llangattock died in 1912. His heir was his first son John Maclean Rolls (1870–1916, dsp.), 2nd Baron Llangattock. He died at Boulogne in 1916 from wounds received at the Battle of the Somme. His younger brother, Henry Alan, having died four months previously, and none of Lord Llangattock's three sons having had children, the direct male line ended and John Maclean Rolls was succeeded by his sister, the scientist and balloonist Eleanor Georgiana Shelley-Rolls (9 October 1872 – 15 September 1961) who married Sir John Courtown Edward Shelley, 6th Baronet (1871–1951), of Castle Goring, who in 1917 assumed by royal licence the additional surname of Rolls. They had no children, so after Eleanor's death, following the death of all her brothers, and the extinction of the barony and surname in the male line, the estate passed back up the family through the closest member of the family with surviving descendants, Patty Rolls, sister of John Allan Rolls. She had married John Taylor Harding of Pentwyn, vicar of Rockfield and Canon of Llandaff, son of John Harding of Henbury and they had four children (John Reginald Harding, Charles Allan Harding, Francis Henry Harding and George Valentine Harding). John Reginald Harding in turn married Elizabeth Margaret Saunders (daughter of Captain John Saunders of Fuzhou, China) and had five children. Upon the extinction of the Rolls branch, the estate came down to his son, John Charles Etherington Harding (born 1898, Xiamen), the first cousin once removed of the 2nd Baron Llangattock, who inherited the house, estate and surrounding farmland, changing his family name to Harding-Rolls for this purpose. The Harding-Rolls branch of the family continued to live at The Hendre until 30 August 1984 when, following a failed time-share operation, it was sold to Effold Properties Limited. The mansion is presently the club house to The Rolls of Monmouth Golf Club.

== Mansion ==
=== History ===
The mansion began as a shooting lodge, for John Rolls (1776–1837), and the original manor house was expanded throughout the next one hundred years. The first of three expansions by the Rolls family began with the architect George Vaughan Maddox, who rebuilt parts of the south wing in 1830. John Rolls's successor, John Etherington Welch Rolls, continued the mansion's development, using Thomas Henry Wyatt as his architect. Wyatt extended the house in the period 1837–41, creating the great hall and improving the park, including the addition of the gate lodges on the Monmouth Road, and he continued the enlargement of the south wing, both to the east and to the west, between 1837 and 1858.

In 1872, the development began again with the removal of the old stables and the building of the present Coach House and loose boxes. At the same time, the core of the present house, being the Billiard Room, Smoking Room and Dining Room, were added. These final two stages of expansion were undertaken by John Etherington Welch Rolls's son, J. A. Rolls. Raised to the peerage as 1st Baron Llangattock, Rolls employed first Henry Pope, (Note: Henry Pope was articled to Wyatt for some seventeen years.) who completed the dining room wing and, secondly, Sir Aston Webb, who added the Cedar Library.

Immediately after the Second World War, a private boys' boarding school was briefly established at The Hendre. Ardmore School catered to British and foreign students with a Dr Jones as headmaster. The son of the lyricist Jimmy Kennedy recalled his time there in the late 1940s, with little fondness: "Ardmore, in a beautiful old mansion near Monmouth, was not a pleasant place to be, even by the standards of the 1940s. The authorities closed it at the end of the 1949 Summer term. The head went to prison". The school appears not to have flourished, as the London Gazette of 20 December 1949 lists Dr Jones, "present address(..)unknown, lately residing at and carrying on business at Ardmore Private School, The Hendre.." for a bankruptcy hearing.

=== Description ===
An article in Kelly's Directory of 1891 describes the Hendre as "a handsome mansion of brick and stone, in the Norman and Tudor styles". The house is constructed of red brick, dressed with Bath stone and comprises a courtyard bounded to the west by a low wall and on the three other sides by ranges of buildings. Above the porch is carved a motto, so beloved of the Victorians, reading "Open House Open Heart". The decoration is flamboyantly neo-Norman, "gargoyles and grotesque animal corbels (breaking) out wherever one looks". The front has two storeys and seven bays, the second, third and fourth belonging to the house of the 1820s. To the east, the scale and grandeur of the dining room range demonstrates J. A. Rolls's "escalating ambitions". Lastly, the wing added by Sir Aston Webb from 1896, comprising the Cedar Library and the later service wing, represents the house at its social and architectural peak. The interior reflects the house's expansion, as the wealth and influence of the family increased, from the small but highly decorated rooms of the 1820s, through to the Great Hall of 1858, and lastly the dining room suite and the Cedar Library of its late Victorian/Edwardian apogee. The architectural writer John Harris is rather dismissive of the house's interiors: "a great number of Elizabethan and Jacobean salvages were incorporated to serve as a background to 'Jacobogus' furniture of every sort, in these somewhat incoherent rooms". Contemporary authors were more appreciative, at least of Sir Aston's work.The naturalist Henry John Elwes and the plantsman Augustine Henry described the Cedar Library in their 1906 publication, The Trees of Great Britain and Ireland, as "One of the best examples of the use of (cedar) for ornamental work is in the library of Lord Llangattock's house, panelled and ceiled by Messrs. Norman and Burt".

For all its antique, neo-Norman decoration, the house was technologically very advanced, the service court including "a gas-making house and an electricity-generating house to power the mechanisms which made The Hendre in Lord Llangattock's time a thoroughly forward-looking estate". In his book, Black Mountains: The Recollections of a South Wales Miner, David Barnes notes his grandfather recalling that The Hendre had been the first house in Monmouthshire to have a telephone when John Allan Rolls installed a Gower Bell loud-speaking telephone in the house in May 1881. The house is a Grade II* listed building.

=== Gardens ===
Whittle (2003) describes the Hendre as "the grandest and most important Victorian park and garden in Monmouthshire." Although the gardens have been largely neglected, with a golf course now taking up much of the park, they remain an essential example of late nineteenth/early twentieth-century garden design, demonstrating the high levels of design and landscaping, conducted mainly by Lord Llangattock towards the end of the 19th century, which accompanied the construction and enlargement of the house. They are designated Grade II* on the Cadw/ICOMOS Register of Parks and Gardens of Special Historic Interest in Wales. The estate boasts an arboretum, stocked with specimen trees (including several ancient oaks), a landscaped lake with an artificial cascade created by James Pulham & Co. and three long drives, the most impressive designed by H.E. Milner in the 1890s. In its heyday, it also contained formal sunken gardens with cast-iron fountains, pavilions, a boathouse and a parterre. The walled kitchen garden is one of the best preserved in Wales, containing two original greenhouses still in good condition. An article in The Gardeners' Magazine of 1903 described the park: "The Hendre stands in a finely wooded park of a thousand acres’ extent, and is reached from the county road by a long drive of about two miles (3 km). This drive was made by Mr H.E. Milner (son of landscape gardener Edward Milner), from his Lordship's own designs. It passes through plantations of the finest conifers, winding upward by easy gradients through oak wood and copse, revealing here and there broad stretches of open park bedded with bracken and peopled with herds of deer." The granary and attached barn, the stable block, the rose garden pavilion and fountain pool, the bridge and the Box Bush lodge at the park entrance are all Grade II Listed. The Swiss Cottage, a lodge at the head of the original main drive, was designed by Aston Webb and is Grade II* listed.

=== Gallery ===
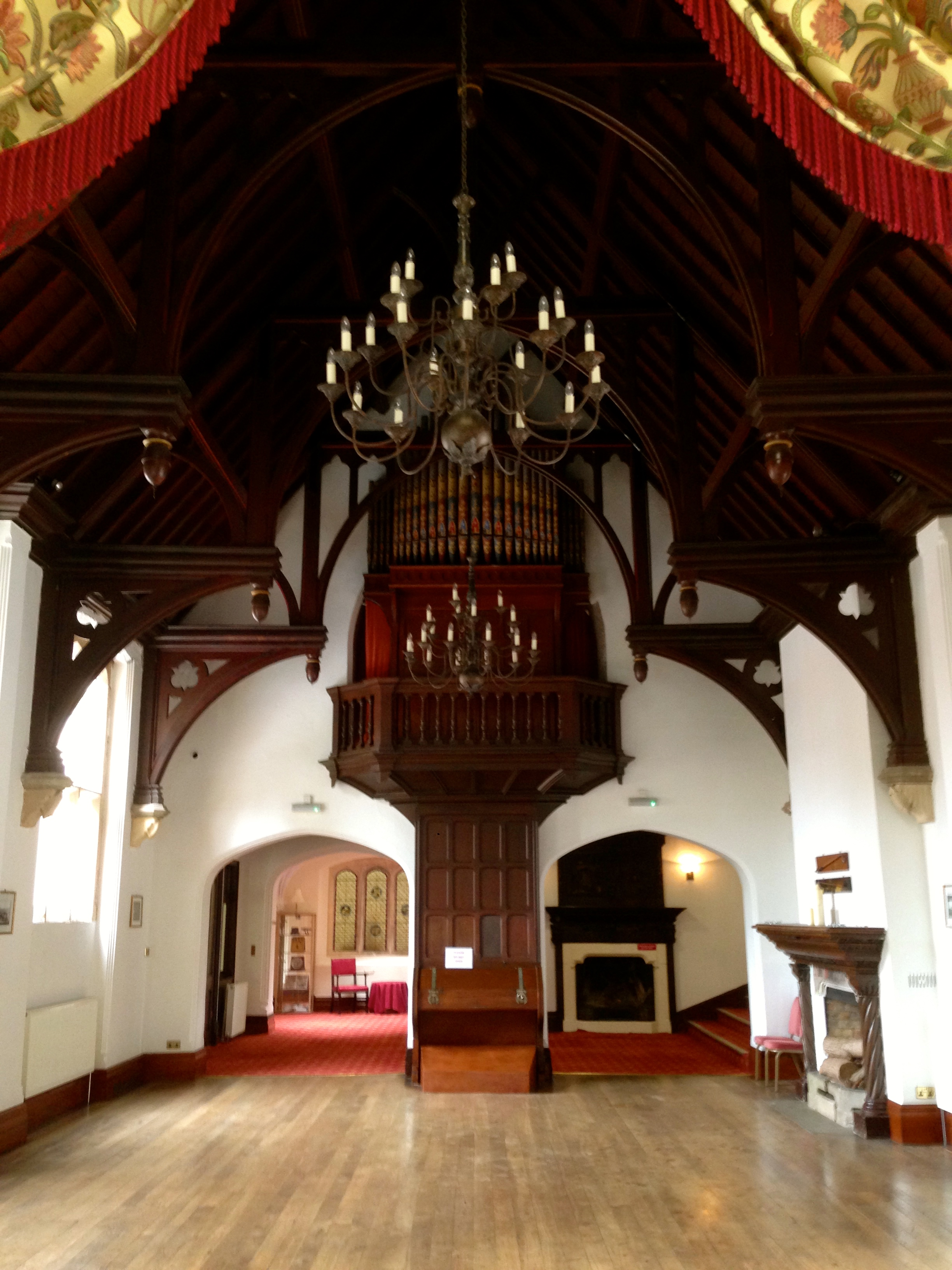
The Great Hall of the Hendre with hammerbeam roof created between 1837 and 1841

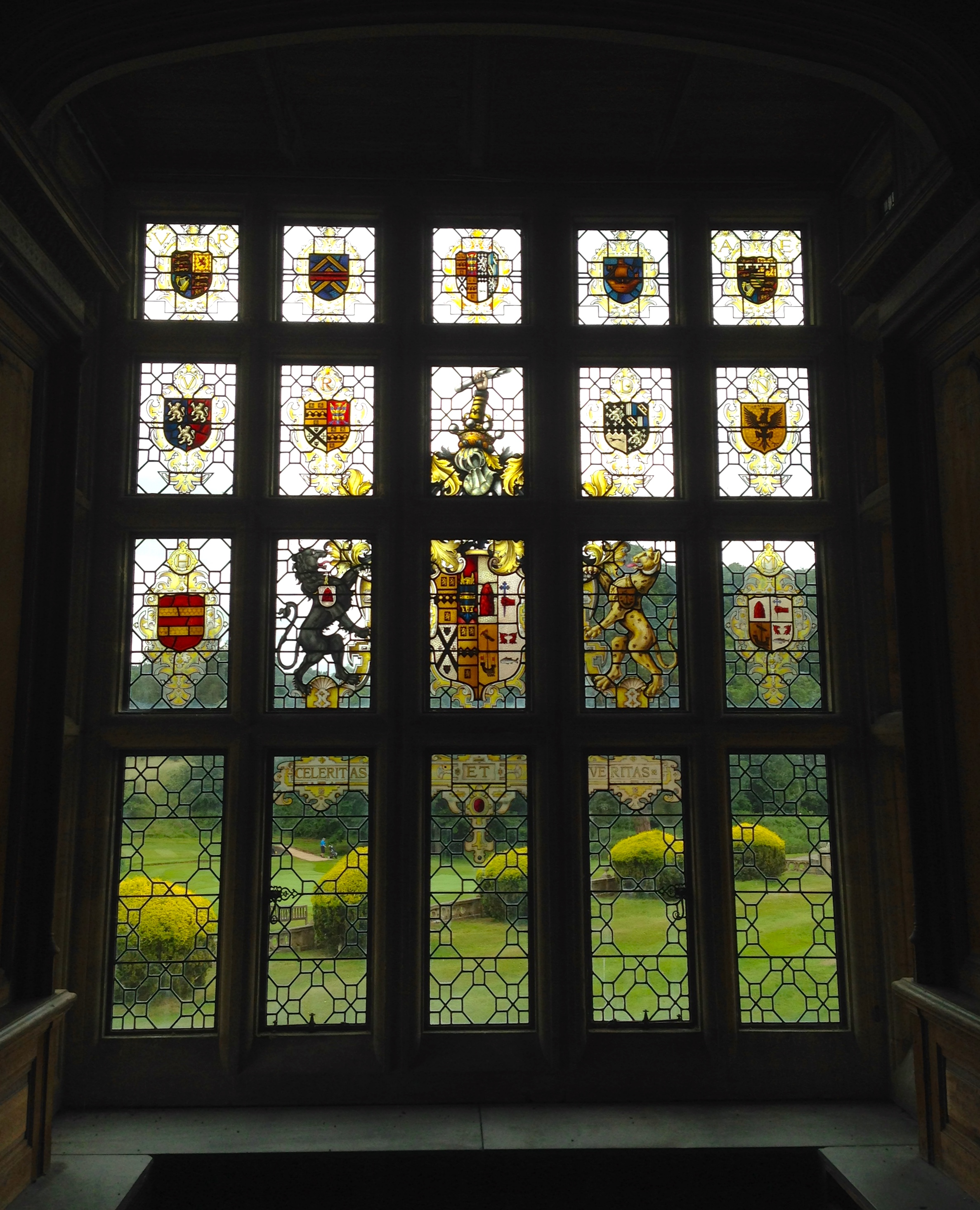
Window in the Cedar Library built by Sir Aston Webb, featuring the arms of Baron Llangattock

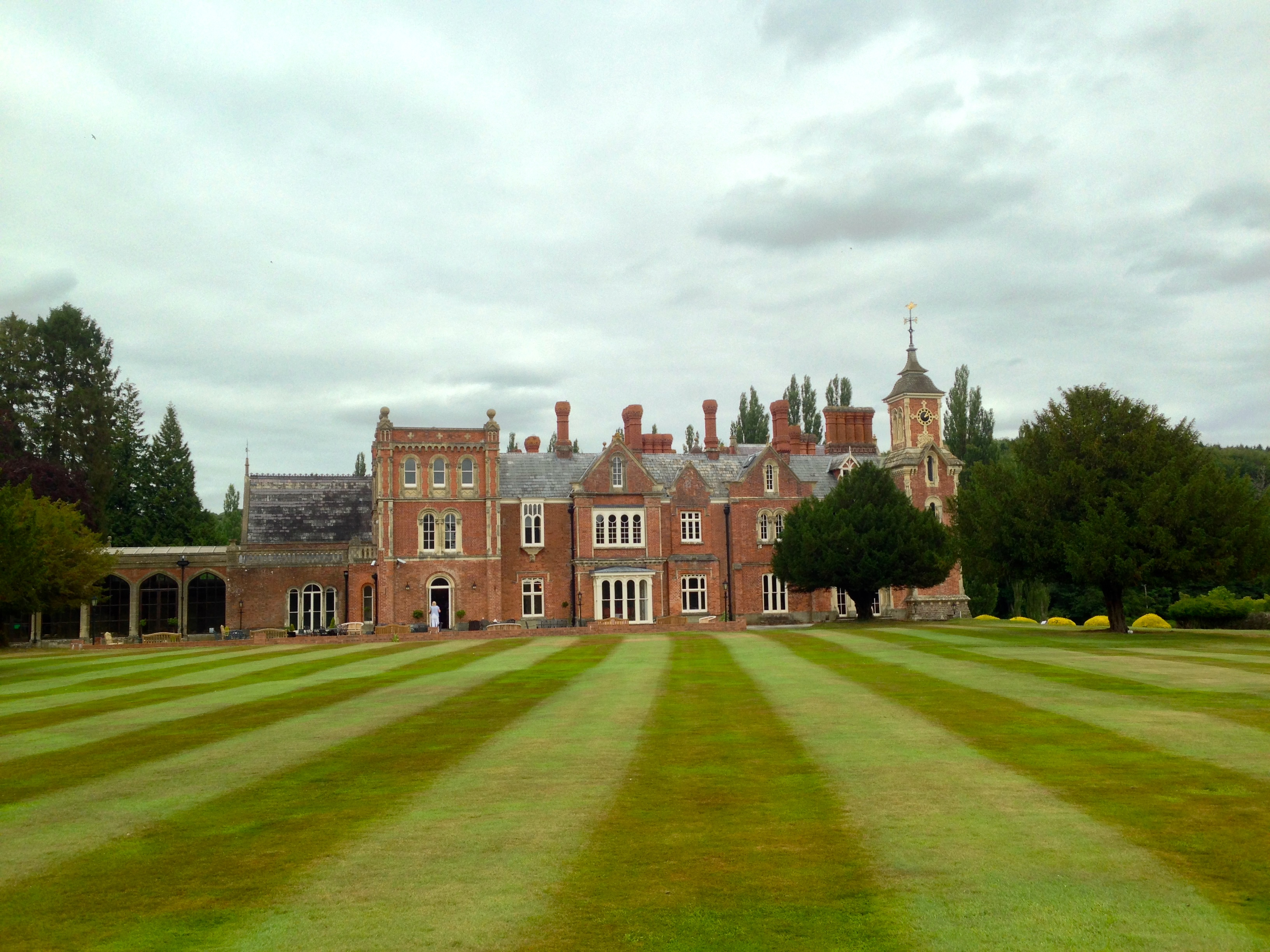
View of the Hendre from the main lawn to the south

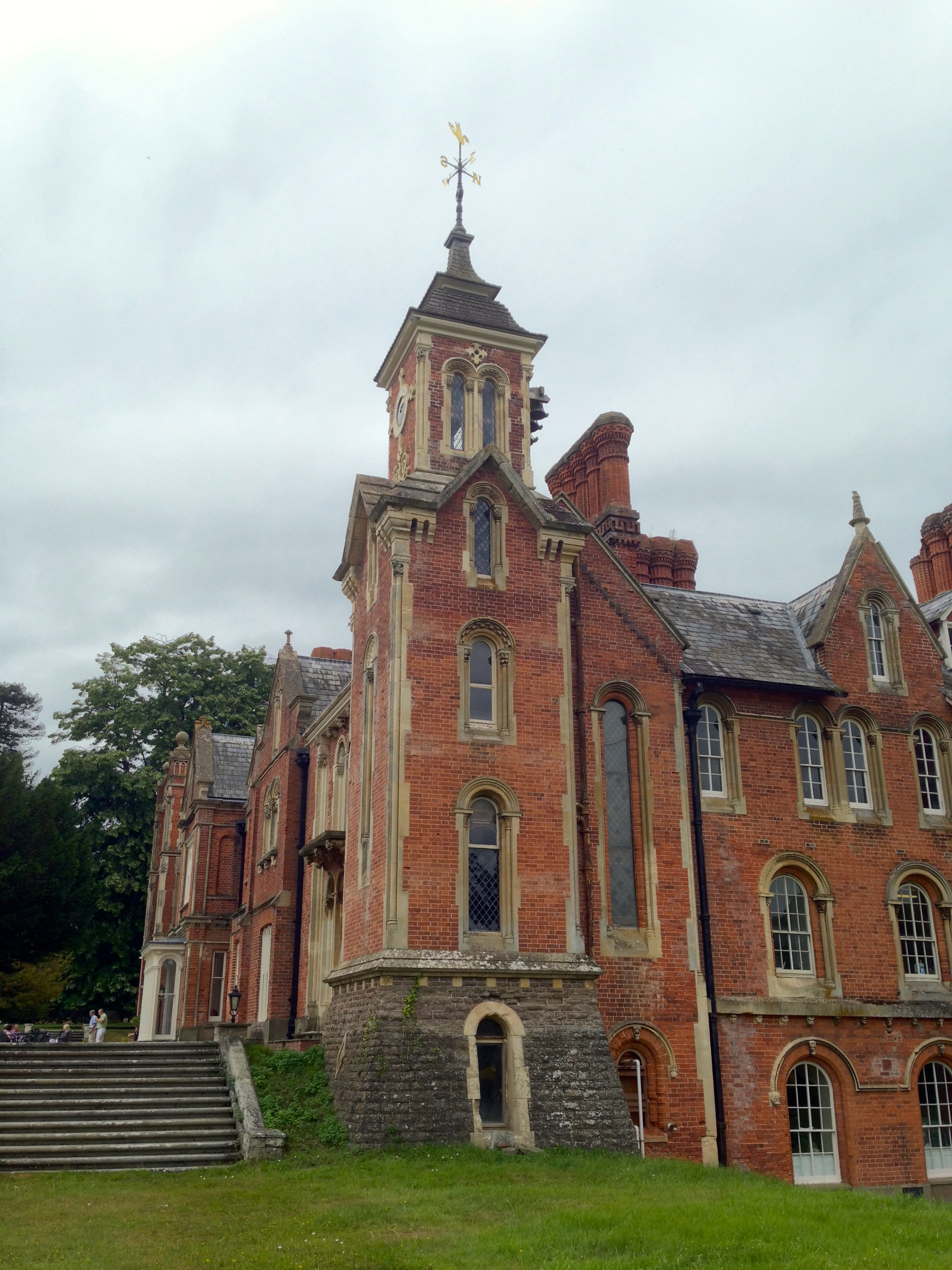
Close up view of the clock tower, restored to working order by Rolls-Royce Limited

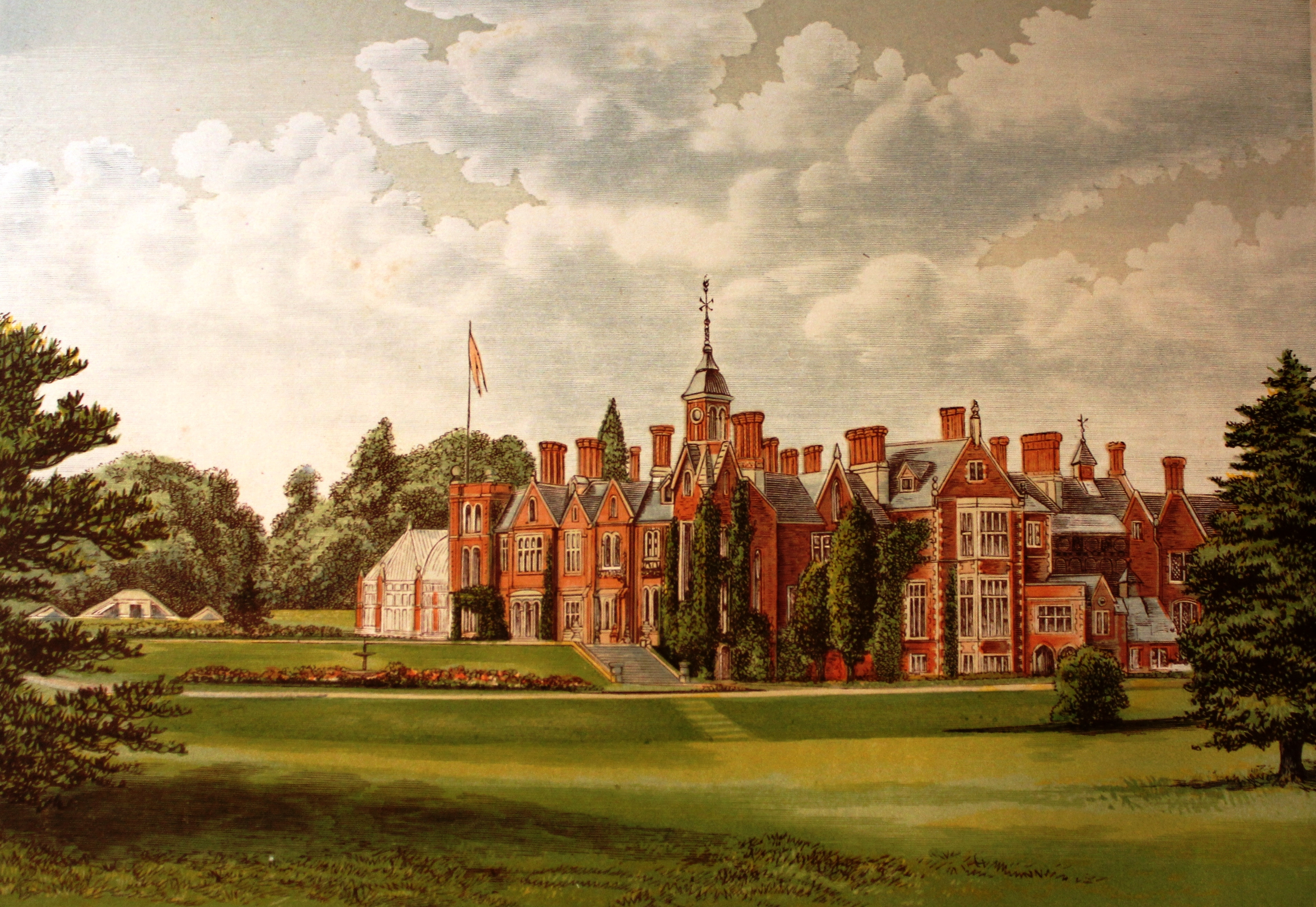
Woodblock illustration of the Hendre

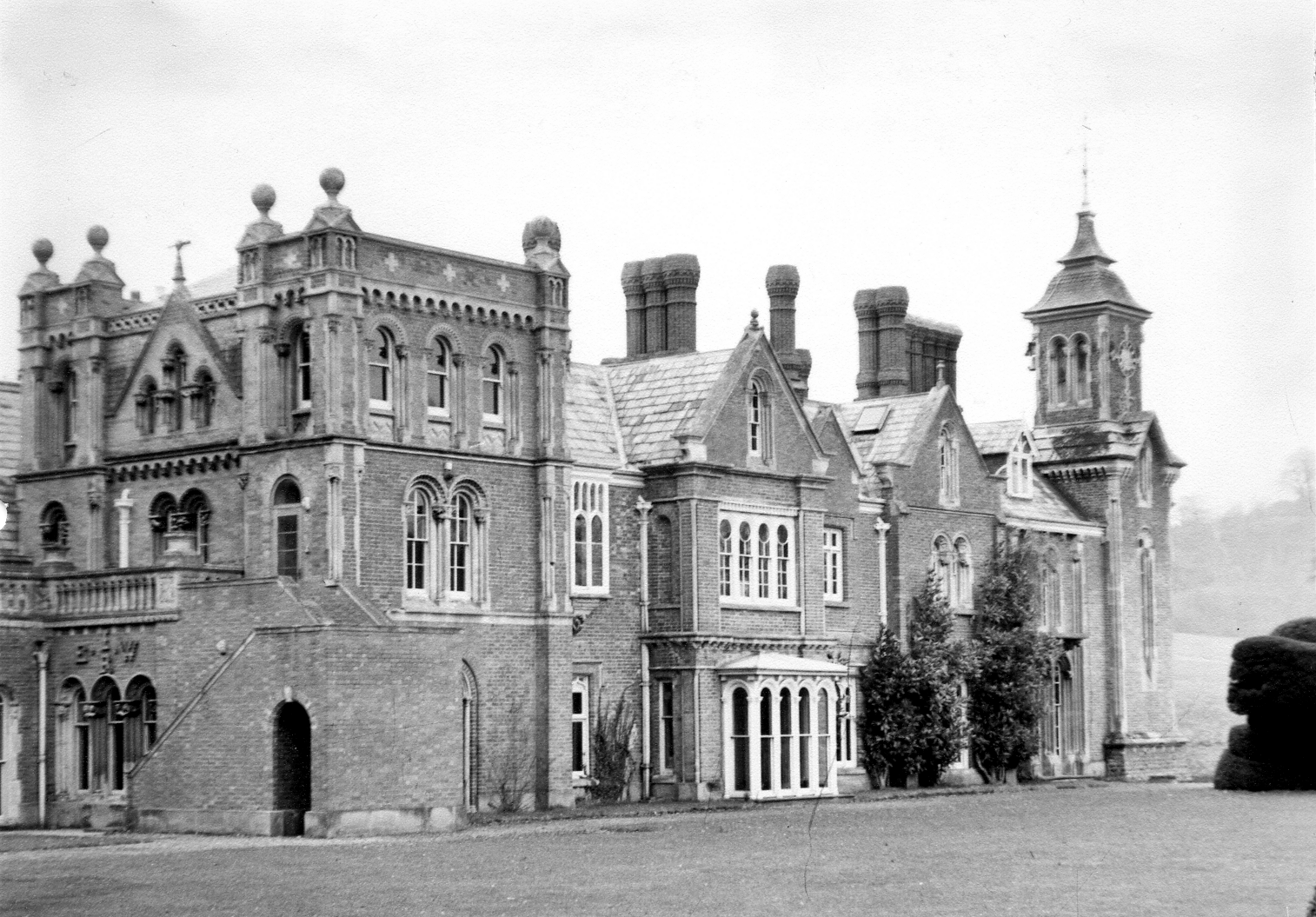
The Hendre in 1970

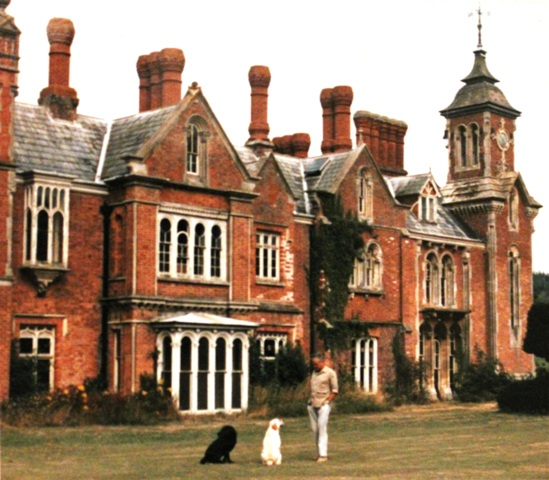
The Hendre in the summer of 1983

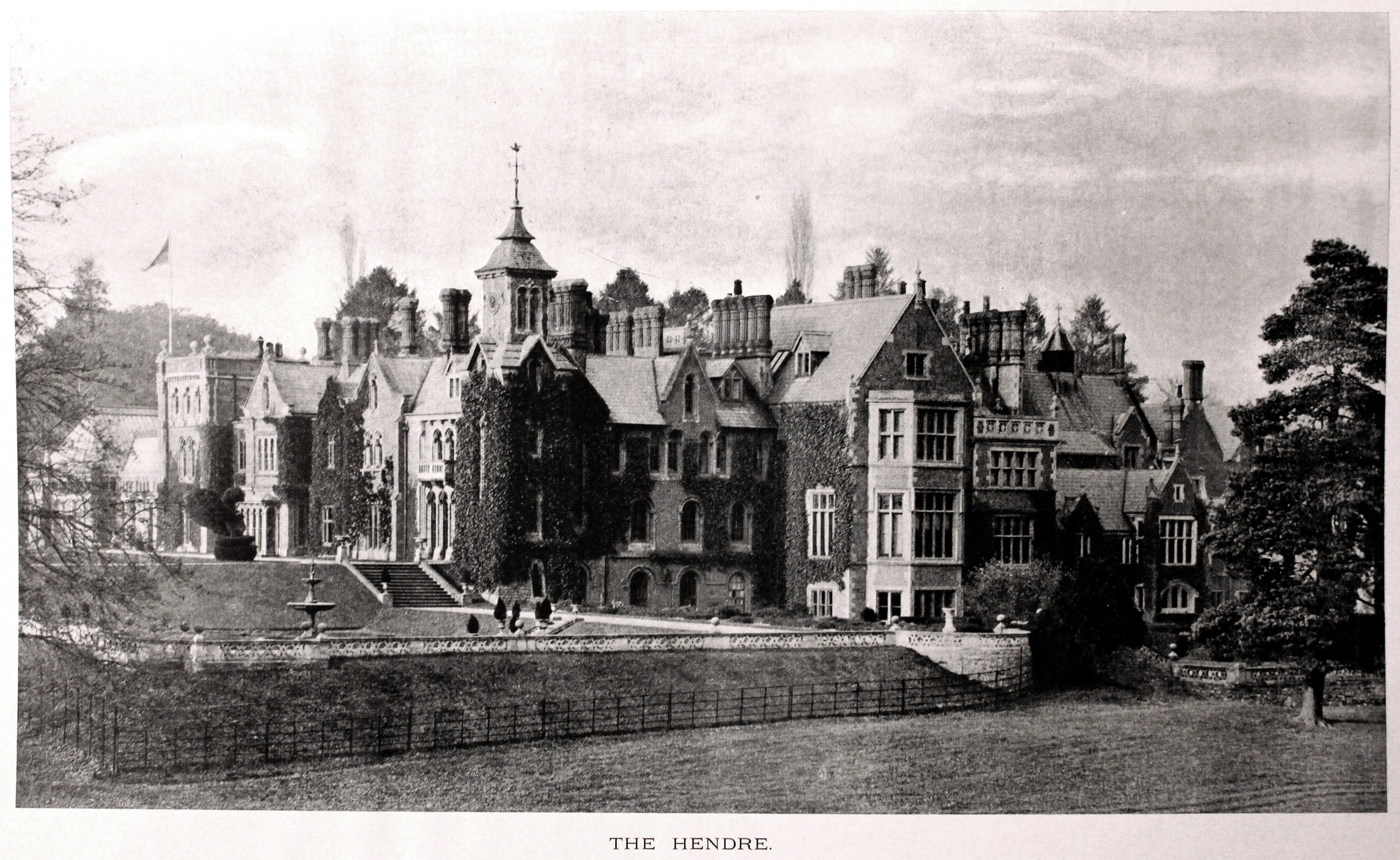
Photograph of the Hendre circa 1900 from A History of Monmouthshire, the Hundred of Skenfrith

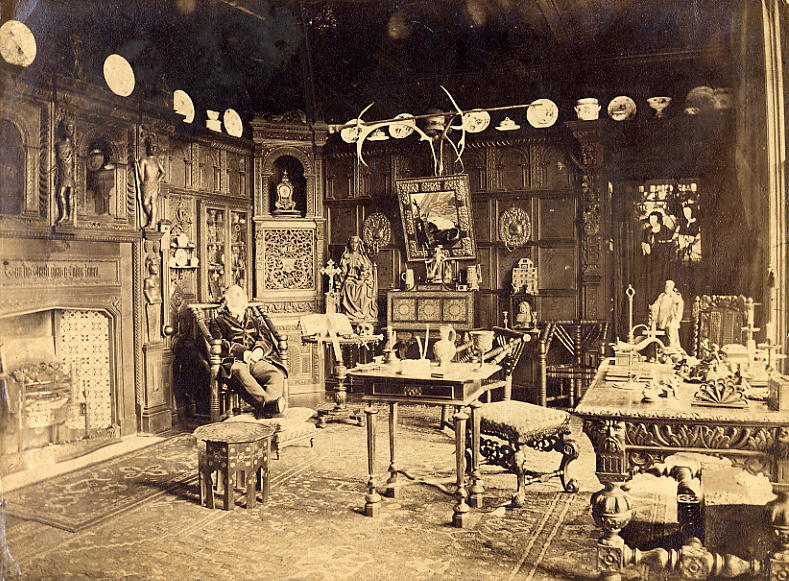
John Etherington Welch Rolls (1807–1870) in the 'Oak Parlour'

== Sources ==
- Barnes, David (2002). Black Mountains: The Recollections of a South Wales Miner. Y Lolfa. ISBN 9780862436124. OCLC 49873651.
- Bradney, Joseph (1904). The Hundred of Skenfrith. A History of Monmouthshire. Mitchell Hughes and Clarke. OCLC 458695265.
- Brodie, Antonia (2001). Directory of British Architects, 1834–1914. Vol. 2 (L–Z). British Architectural Library. ISBN 978-0-826-45514-7.
- Elwes, Henry John; Henry, Augustine (2014) [1906]. The Trees of Great Britain and Ireland. Cambridge: Cambridge University Press. ISBN 9781108069373.
- Harris, John (2007). Moving Rooms: The Trade in Architectural Salvages. New Haven, US and London, UK: Yale University Press. ISBN 9780300124200.
- Hiling, John B. (2018). The Architecture of Wales: From the First to the Twenty-First Centuries. Cardiff: University of Wales Press. ISBN 978-1-786-83285-6.
- Kennedy, J. J. (2011). The Man Who Wrote the Teddy Bears' Picnic: How Irish-Born Lyricist and Composer Jimmy Kennedy Became One of the Twentieth Century's Finest Songwriters. AuthorHouse. ISBN 9781467885690.
- Newman, John (2000). Gwent/Monmouthshire. The Buildings of Wales. Penguin. ISBN 0-14-071053-1.
