= John Rolls of The Hendre =

British judge (1776–1837)

John Rolls
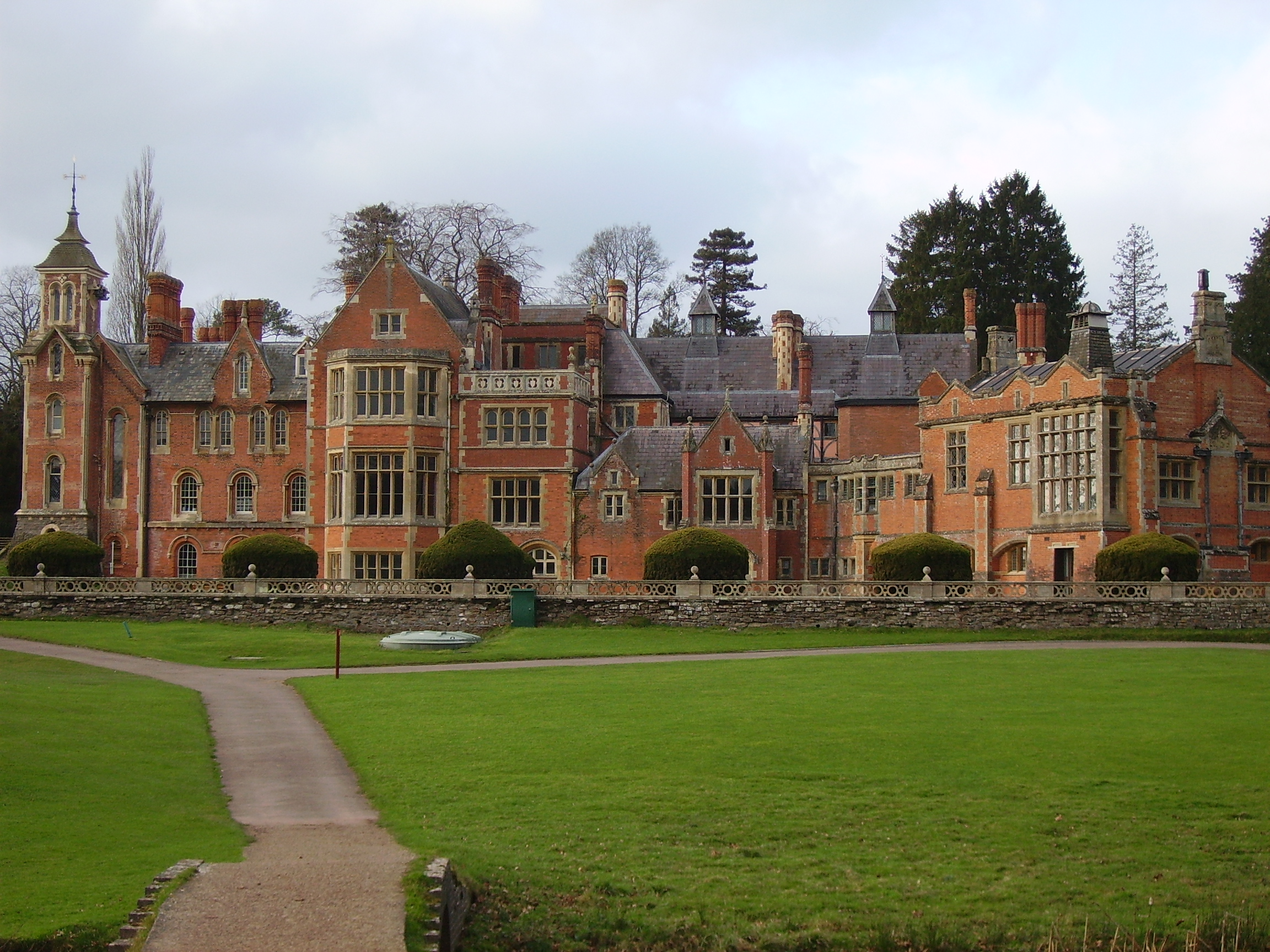
- The Hendre at Llangattock-Vibon-Avel
- Born: 20 October 1776; Bermondsey, Southwark, London, Surrey, England
- Died: 31 January 1837 (aged 60)
- Occupation: Justice of the Peace
- Known for: The Hendre

John Rolls of The Hendre (20 October 1776 – 31 January 1837) was a native of Bermondsey, in Southwark, London, Surrey, England. A member of the renowned Rolls family of The Hendre at Llangattock-Vibon-Avel near Monmouth, Monmouthshire, Wales, he undertook the first of several expansions of the mansion. The Hendre was also the childhood home of his great-grandson Charles Stewart Rolls, aviation pioneer and co-founder of Rolls-Royce Limited. John Rolls was a Justice of the Peace, as well as a Lieutenant Colonel of the Loyal Southwark Volunteer Infantry.

== Family ==
John Rolls, son of John Rolls (1735 – 8 September 1801) and his wife Sarah Coysh Rolls (d. 7 September 1801), was born on 20 October 1776 at The Grange in the parish of Bermondsey, borough of Southwark. He was baptized on 17 November 1776 at St Mary Magdalen, Bermondsey. His mother Sarah was the second daughter of Thomas Coysh of Camberwell and an heiress. Sarah succeeded her brother Richard Coysh, and eventually was the only remaining heir of the estates of the Coysh, Allen, and James families. Upon Sarah's marriage to John Rolls, she brought a substantial amount of property in Monmouthshire and London. Their son John Rolls inherited the estate upon the deaths of both of his parents in September 1801, his father dying the day after his mother. While John Rolls was the only surviving son, he had had at least one older brother, Henry Allen Rolls, who was born on 22 May 1772 and baptized on 18 June 1772 at St Mary Magdalen, Bermondsey. On both baptismal records, for John and Henry Allen, their father's occupation was recorded as "cow keeper."

Rolls was a justice of the peace. In addition, the London Gazette of 6 September 1803 reported that John Rolls, Esquire had been appointed Lieutenant Colonel of the Loyal Southwark Volunteer Infantry. Earlier that year, on 27 January 1803, at St Marylebone, London, John Rolls married Martha Barnet, only daughter and heiress of Jacob Barnet. They had five children: John Etherington Welch Rolls, Alexander Rolls, Martha Sarah Rolls Macready, Jessy Rolls Harcourt, and Louisa Elizabeth Rolls Vaughan. John Rolls of The Hendre died on 31 January 1837. His widow Martha Barnet Rolls died on 28 October 1858 at Park Villa, Leckhampton, Cheltenham, Gloucestershire.

Their son John E. W. Rolls was the grandfather of Charles Stewart Rolls, aviation pioneer and co-founder of Rolls-Royce. The Hendre was his childhood home. Alexander Rolls was Mayor of Monmouth for four terms. Their oldest daughter Martha, born 15 December 1804, married Major Edward Nevill Macready of the 30th Regiment on 1 August 1840. She was widowed in 1848, and died on 7 August 1887 at Park Villa, Cheltenham, Gloucestershire. Their second daughter Jessy was born on 25 June 1809, and married George Simon Harcourt on 24 June 1833. Harcourt was a Member of Parliament and resided at Ankerwycke House in Buckinghamshire. Jessy died in Paris on 29 July 1842. Youngest daughter Louisa was born in 1810, and became the wife of John Francis Vaughan, eldest son of William Vaughan of Courtfield, on 12 July 1830. Louisa "Eliza" died in 1853. Daughters Jessy and Louisa both had children.

== Residences ==
The residences of John Rolls included Bryanston Square, London; The Grange, Surrey; and The Hendre, Monmouthshire. The Bryanston Square home was at 3 Bryanston Square, Marylebone, London. The Grange was in Bermondsey parish, Southwark, London. The Hendre estate was at Llangattock-Vibon-Avel, near Monmouth, Monmouthshire. It was initially the property of the Allen family, and was inherited by his mother, Sarah Coysh Rolls, the niece and heiress of Henry Allen (1691 – 1767). The Hendre was originally a hunting lodge. In 1830, the first of several expansions of The Hendre was undertaken. This was performed by architect George Vaughan Maddox, under the direction of John Rolls. The mansion's development primarily involved reconstruction of the south wing of the building.

The second and third expansions of The Hendre were undertaken by his oldest son and successor John Etherington Welch Rolls, and grandson John Allan Rolls, respectively. Both men used the services of architect Thomas Henry Wyatt. Between 1837 and 1858, Wyatt built the great hall, made improvements to the grounds, and further increased the size of the south wing for John E W Rolls. In 1872, Wyatt took down the old stables for John A Rolls, building larger stables. He not only added a coach house, but also rooms for billiards, smoking, and dining. A fourth enlargement of the mansion was performed in 1896, again for John A Rolls, then Lord Llangattock, with the addition of the library wing. The architect was Aston Webb (1849 – 1930), renowned for his work on Buckingham Palace, including its east facade. The Hendre at Llangattock-Vibon-Avel was grade II* listed on 4 November 1985. The Hendre estate remained in the Rolls family until 1987, and is now The Rolls of Monmouth Golf Club.

== Family tree ==
John Rolls (1735–1801)	Sarah Coysh (d. 1801)
John Rolls of The Hendre (1776–1837)	Martha Maria Barnet (d. 1858)
John Etherington Welch Rolls (1807-1870)	Alexander Rolls (1818-1882)	Martha Sarah Rolls (1804-1887)	Jessy Rolls (1809-1842)	Louisa Elizabeth Rolls (1810-1853)
