= Rolls family =

Landowners and benefactors in south-east Wales

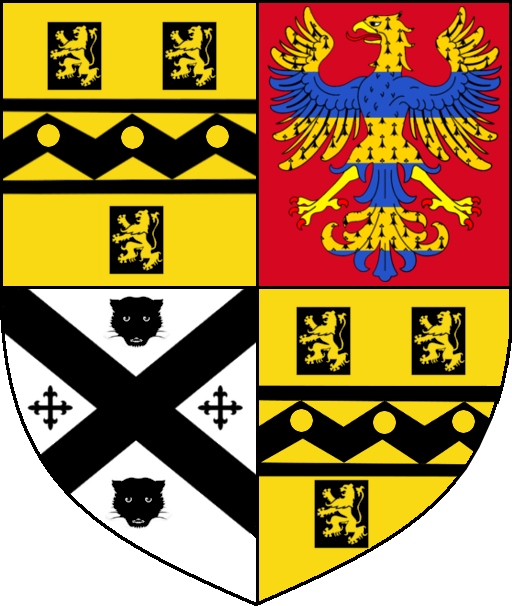
The Rolls of The Hendre coat of arms, combining variants of the Rolls, Coysh and Barnett arms

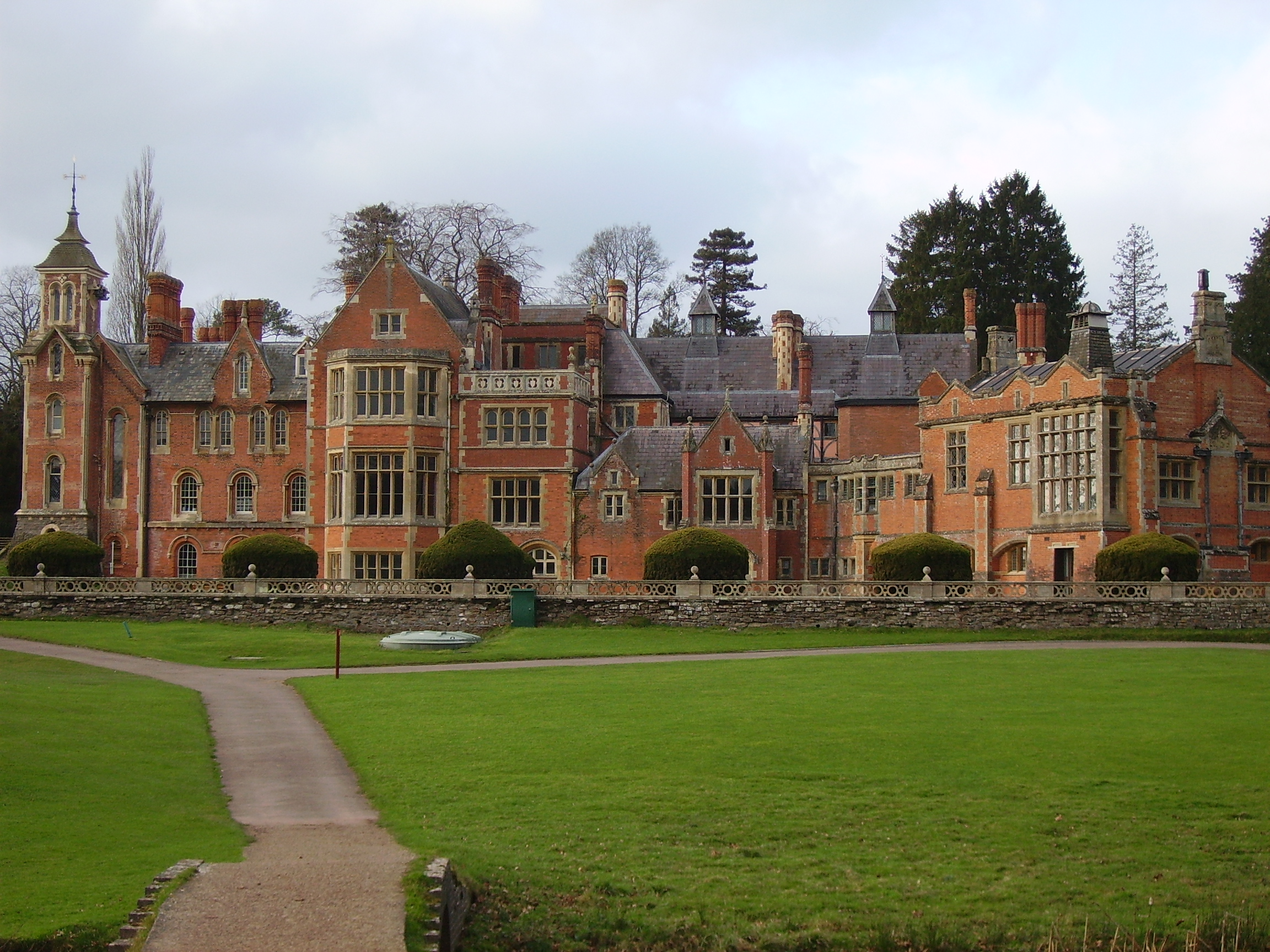
The family home at The Hendre, near Monmouth

The Rolls family were substantial landowners and benefactors in and around Monmouth in south-east Wales. The ascent of the family to the aristocracy was through marriage. A prominent member of the family was Charles Stewart Rolls, who co-founded the Rolls-Royce car manufacturing company.

The family's arms were described in 1852 as:

Quarterly: 1st and 4th, or, on a fesse, dancettée, with plain cotises between three billets, sa., each charged with a lion, rampant, of the field, as many bezants; 2nd, gu., an eagle, displayed, barry of six, erminois and az.; 3rd, or, a saltier, sa., in chief, a leopard's face, of the second.

== John Rolls and "The Hendre" ==
The Rolls family of Monmouth derive from John Rolls (1735–1801), son of Aaron and Elizabeth Rolls, the Grange, Bermondsey, and of the Hendre, Monmouthshire, High Sheriff of Monmouthshire in 1794. Much of his property in both Monmouthshire and London came through his marriage to Sarah Coysh (d. 1801), heiress of her brother Richard. John Rolls died the day after his wife.

John was succeeded by his son John Rolls (1776–1837) who, with his wife Martha, built the finest country estate in Monmouthshire: The Hendre (Welsh: Yr Hendre). It was a shooting lodge that was expanded throughout the next one hundred years. It is Monmouthshire's only full-scale Victorian country house, constructed in the Victorian Gothic style. It is located in the parish of Llangattock-Vibon-Avel, some 4 miles (6.4 km) north-west of the town of Monmouth. The first of three expansions by the Rolls family began with the architect George Vaughan Maddox who rebuilt parts of the south wing in 1830. John Rolls' successor, John Etherington Welch Rolls, continued the mansion's development, using Thomas Henry Wyatt as his architect.

== John Etherington Welch Rolls ==
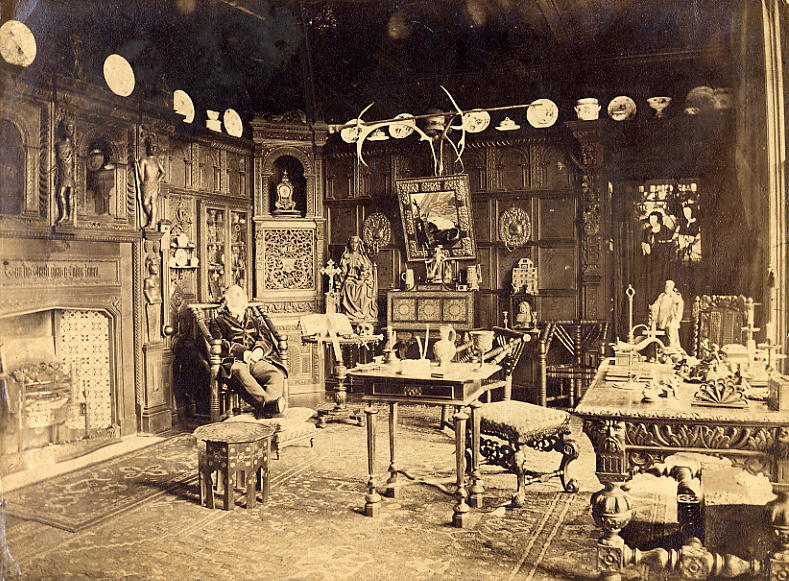
John Etherington Welch Rolls (1807–1870) in the 'Oak Parlour'

John was succeeded by his son John Etherington Welch Rolls (4 May 1807 – 27 May 1870), sheriff of Monmouthshire. In 1842 he married Elizabeth Mary Long, granddaughter of William Carnegie, 7th Earl of Northesk. He was succeeded by his son, also named John.

== John Allan Rolls ==
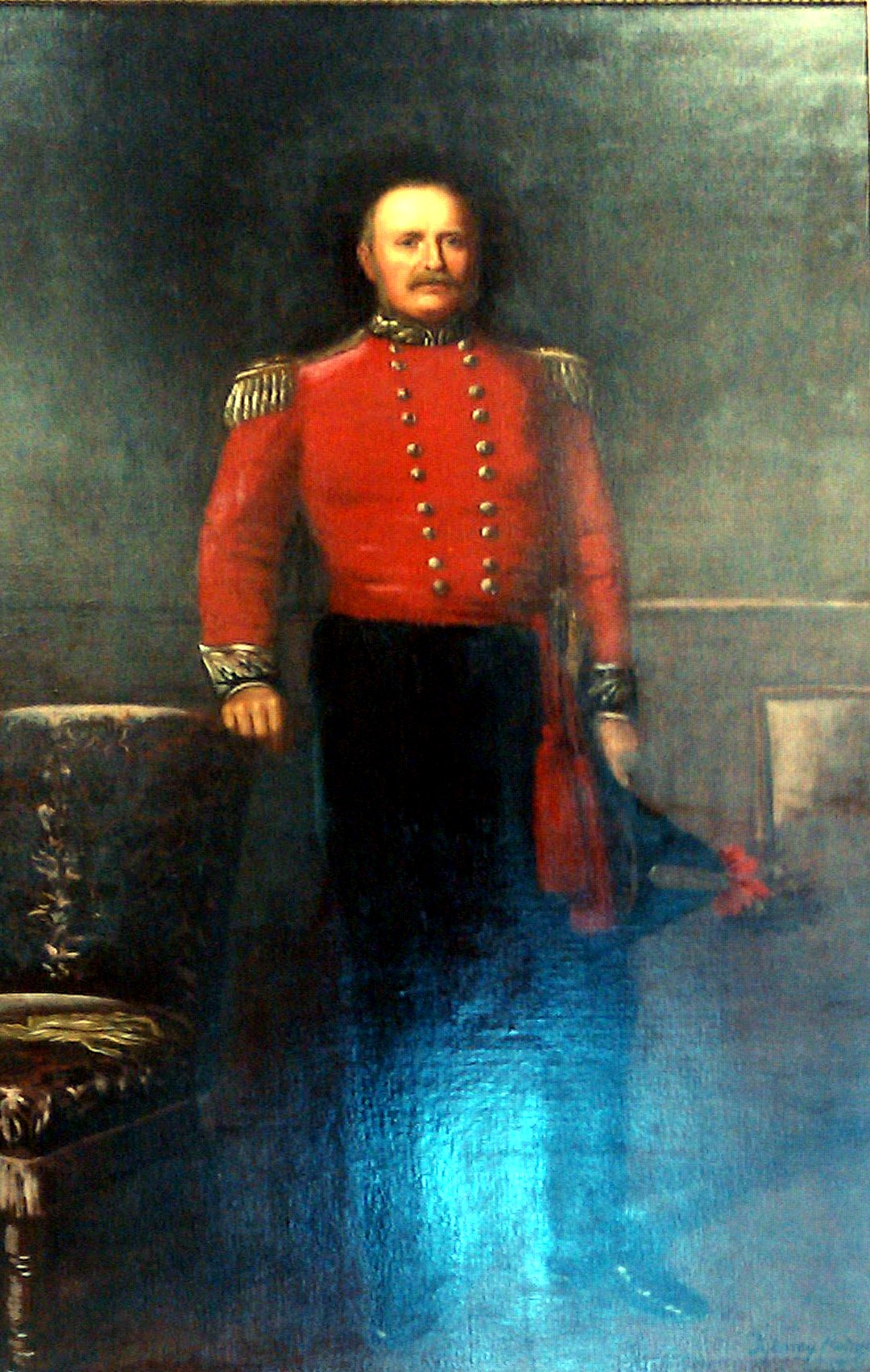
John Rolls, 1st Baron Llangattock

John Allan Rolls (19 February 1837 – 24 September 1912), sheriff in 1875 and MP for Monmouthshire, 1880–1885, created Baron Llangattock of the Hendre, 1892.

John Allan Rolls's ennoblement brought the family, and the house, to its social apogee, culminating in a visit from the Duke and Duchess of York (later King George V and Queen Mary), who stayed with Lord and Lady Llangattock at the Hendre in late October – early November 1900. The Duke and Duchess were taken on motor car excursions by Charles Rolls, probably the first time that the royal couple had been in a car. This was an important event in the family's social history, confirming their elevation to the upper echelons of society.

Of John Allan's three sons, the most famous was Charles, the co-founder of Rolls-Royce.

== Charles Rolls ==
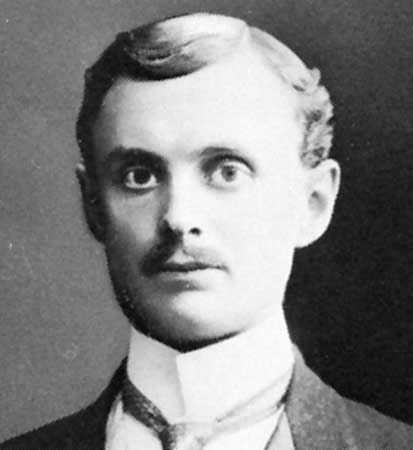
Charles Stewart Rolls

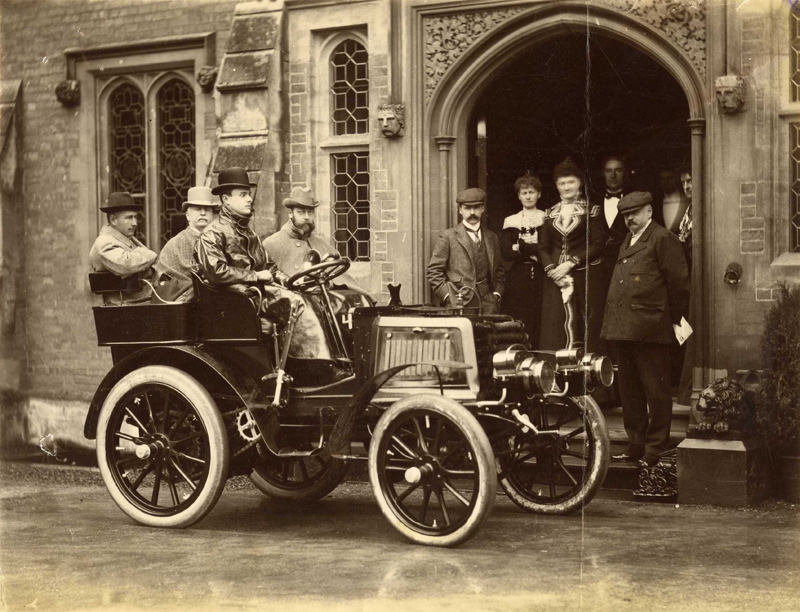
Photograph of the Hon. C.S. Rolls' autocar with HRH The Duke of York, Lord Llangattock (Rolls' father), Sir Charles Cust and the Hon. C.S. Rolls as occupants", taken by John Howard Preston. Charles Stewart Rolls went on to co-found Rolls-Royce in 1904. The photograph shows The Hendre, the family's gothic mansion in Monmouthshire.

Charles Stewart Rolls (27 August 1877 - 12 July 1910) was a motoring and aviation pioneer. Together with Frederick Henry Royce he co-founded the Rolls-Royce car manufacturing firm. He was the first Briton to be killed in a flying accident, when the tail of his Wright Flyer broke off during a flying display near Bournemouth, England. He was aged 32. As well as his interests in cars and aeroplanes, Charles was a keen balloonist, the Flight Magazine of January 1909 recording a flight from Monmouth:

Ballooning Home. On Saturday last the Hon. C. S. Rolls gave an exhibition of the possibilities of ballooning by taking his mother, Lady Llangattock, home by balloon. The ascent was made at Monmouth in the balloon " Mercury," the occupants of the basket being Lady Llangattock, Hon. C. S. Rolls, Hon. Mrs. Assheton – Harbord, Mr. Claud Crompton, and Mr. Charles Freeman, and the balloon landed on the lawn in front of Lord Llangattock's house, The Hendre.

== John Maclean Rolls ==
Lord Llangattock died in 1912. His heir was his first son John Maclean Rolls (1870–1916, dsp.), 2nd Baron Llangattock. He died at Boulogne in 1916 from wounds received at the Battle of the Somme. With his younger brother, Henry Allen, having died four months previously, and none of Lord Llangattock's three sons having had children, the direct male line ended. John Maclean Rolls was succeeded by his sister Eleanor Georgiana (d. 1961), wife of John Courtown Edward Shelley.

== Harding-Rolls ==
With the deaths of Charles Rolls, Henry Allen Rolls and John Maclean Rolls and the extinction of the barony and surname in the male line, the estate passed back up the family through the closest member of the family with surviving descendants, Patty Rolls, sister of John Allan Rolls. She had married John Taylor Harding of Pentwyn, vicar of Rockfield and Canon of Llandaff, son of John Harding of Henbury and Jane Morgan, and they had four children (John Reginald Harding, Charles Allan Harding, Francis Henry Harding and George Valentine Harding). John Reginald Harding in turn married Elizabeth Margaret Saunders (daughter of Captain John Saunders of Fuzhou, China) and had five children. Upon the extinction of the Rolls branch, the estate came down to his son, John Charles Etherington Harding (born 1898, Xiamen), the first cousin once removed of the 2nd Baron Llangattock, who inherited the house, estate and surrounding farmland, changing his family name to Harding-Rolls for this purpose.

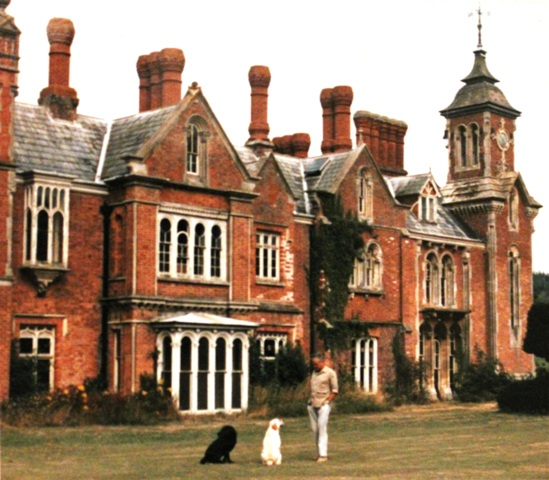
The Hendre in the summer of 1983

The Harding-Rolls branch of the family continued to live at The Hendre until 30 August 1984 when, following a failed time-share operation, it was sold to Effold Properties Limited. The mansion is now the focal point of the Rolls of Monmouth golf course.

== The Rolls family tree ==
John Rolls (1735–1801)	Sarah Coysh (d. 1801)
John Rolls of The Hendre (1776–1837)	Martha Maria Barnet
John Etherington Welch Rolls (1807–70)	Elizabeth Mary Long	Alexander Rolls (1818-1882)	Helen Barry (1840-1904)
Patricia Harding (née Rolls) (1835-1919)	John Allan Rolls, 1st Baron Llangattock (1837–1912)	Georgiana Marcia Maclean (1837 – 1923)
John Maclean Rolls, 2nd Baron Llangattock (1870–1916)	Henry Allen Rolls (1871–1916)	Eleanor Georgiana Rolls (1872–1961)	Charles Stewart Rolls (1877–1910) (co-founder of Rolls-Royce)

== See also ==
- Elizabeth Harcourt Mitchell
