= Sarah Coysh =

English heiress (c. 1742 – 1801)

Sarah Coysh Rolls
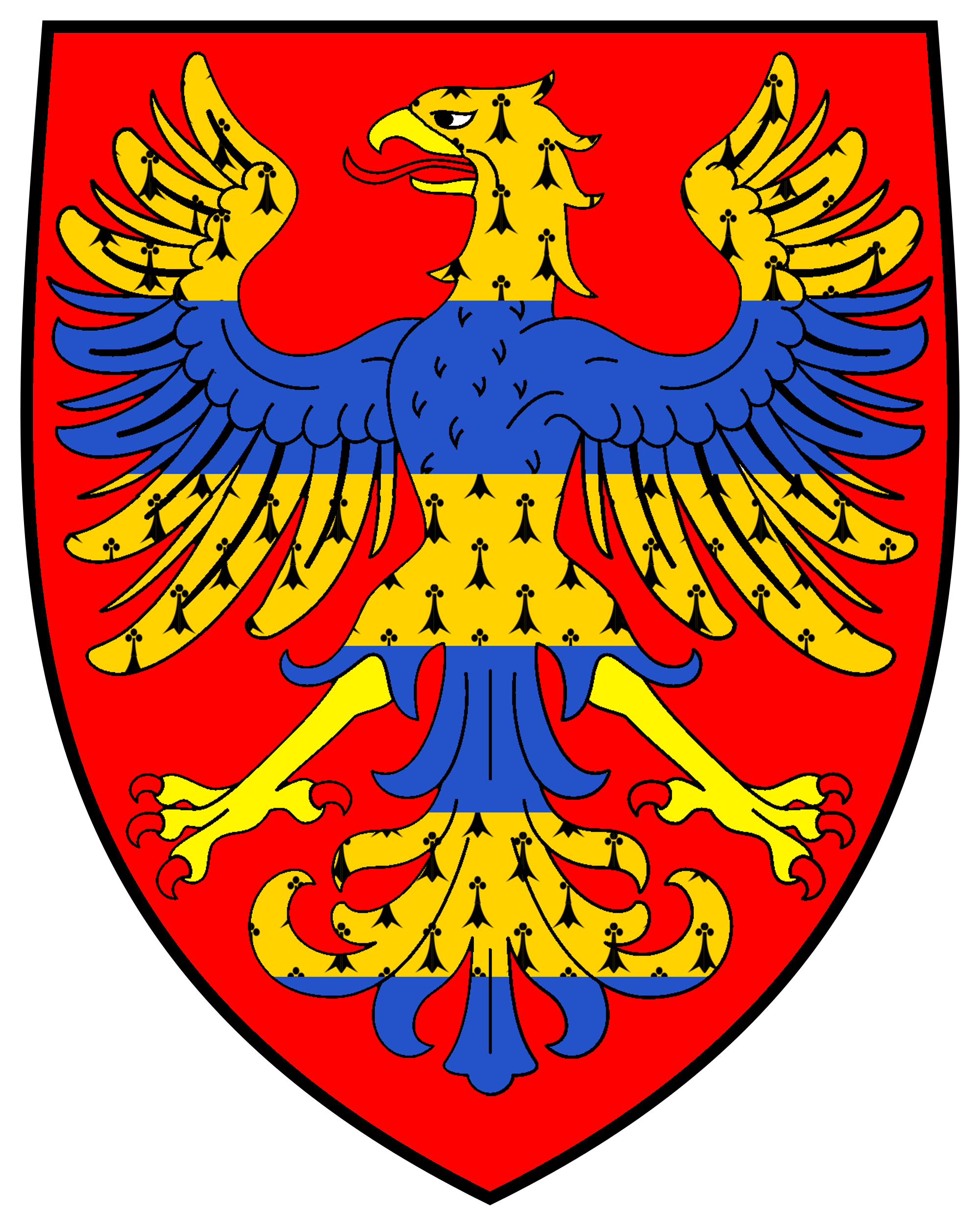
- Arms of Coysh: Gules, an eagle displayed barry of six erminois and azure
- Born: c. 1742
- Died: 7 September 1801; Bermondsey, Southwark, London, Surrey, England
- Spouse: John Rolls
- Children: John Rolls of The Hendre

Sarah Coysh (c. 1742 – 1801) was the heiress to the estates of the Coysh, Allen, and James families. Her marriage to John Rolls (1735–1801) illustrates one of the methods by which the renowned Rolls family of Monmouthshire, Wales, and London, England, accumulated and improved their properties and advanced their social rank during the eighteenth and nineteenth centuries.

By 1830, her son John Rolls of The Hendre in Llangattock-Vibon-Avel, Monmouthshire, near Monmouth, had made the estate his country seat and undertaken the first of several expansions of the mansion. By 1892, two expansions later, his grandson John A Rolls had been elevated to the peerage and had become Baron Llangattock of The Hendre. At the turn of the twentieth century, following the mansion's fourth enlargement, the family was honoured with a visit from the future King George V and Queen Mary, then the Duke and Duchess of York. The royal visit included a ride in the automobile of Lord Llangattock's son Charles Stewart Rolls, future aviation pioneer and co-founder of Rolls-Royce.
