= John Etherington Welch Rolls =

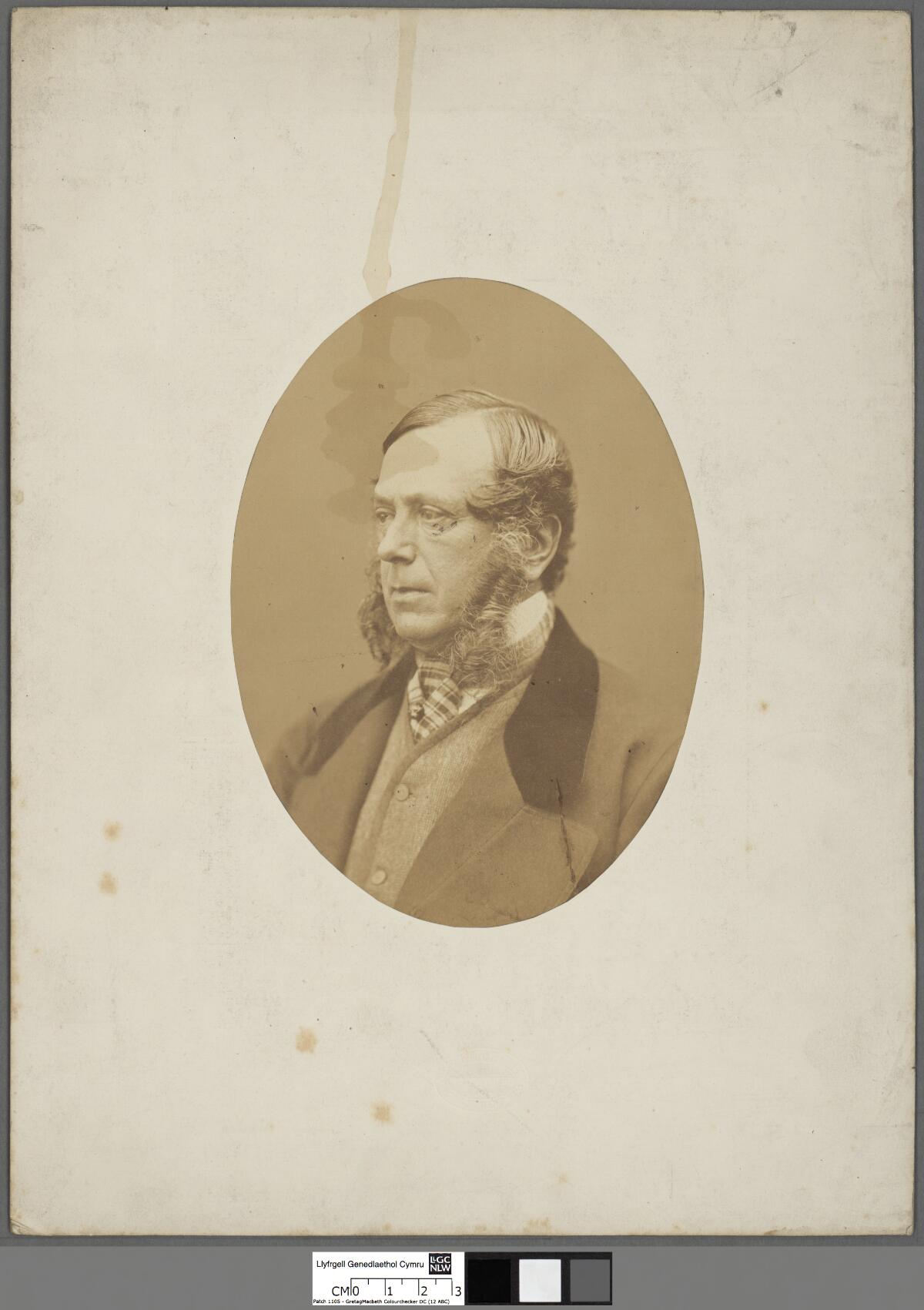
- Born: 4 May 1807
- Died: 27 May 1870 (aged 63)
- Spouse: Elizabeth Mary Long
- Children: John A. Rolls et al.

John Etherington Welch Rolls (4 May 1807 – 27 May 1870) was a Sheriff of Monmouthshire, art collector, Deputy Lieutenant and Justice of the Peace. Rolls was co-founder and president of the Monmouth Show.

== Life ==
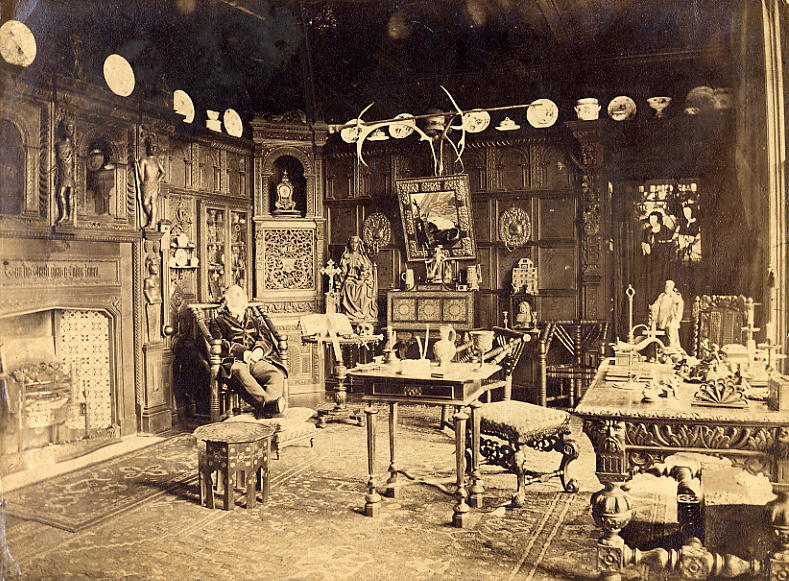
Rolls in the 'Oak Parlour' at The Hendre

Rolls was born in 1807, a son of John Rolls of The Hendre, near Monmouth, by his wife Martha. On 26 May 1833 he married Elizabeth Long, daughter of Walter Long (of Preshaw) by his wife Mary Carnegie (1789–1875), eldest daughter of William Carnegie, 7th Earl of Northesk. Rolls served as Sheriff of Monmouthshire in 1842. Rolls and his wife had several children but only one son, John Rolls, 1st Baron Llangattock. Rolls' brother Alexander Rolls married the actress Helen Barry.

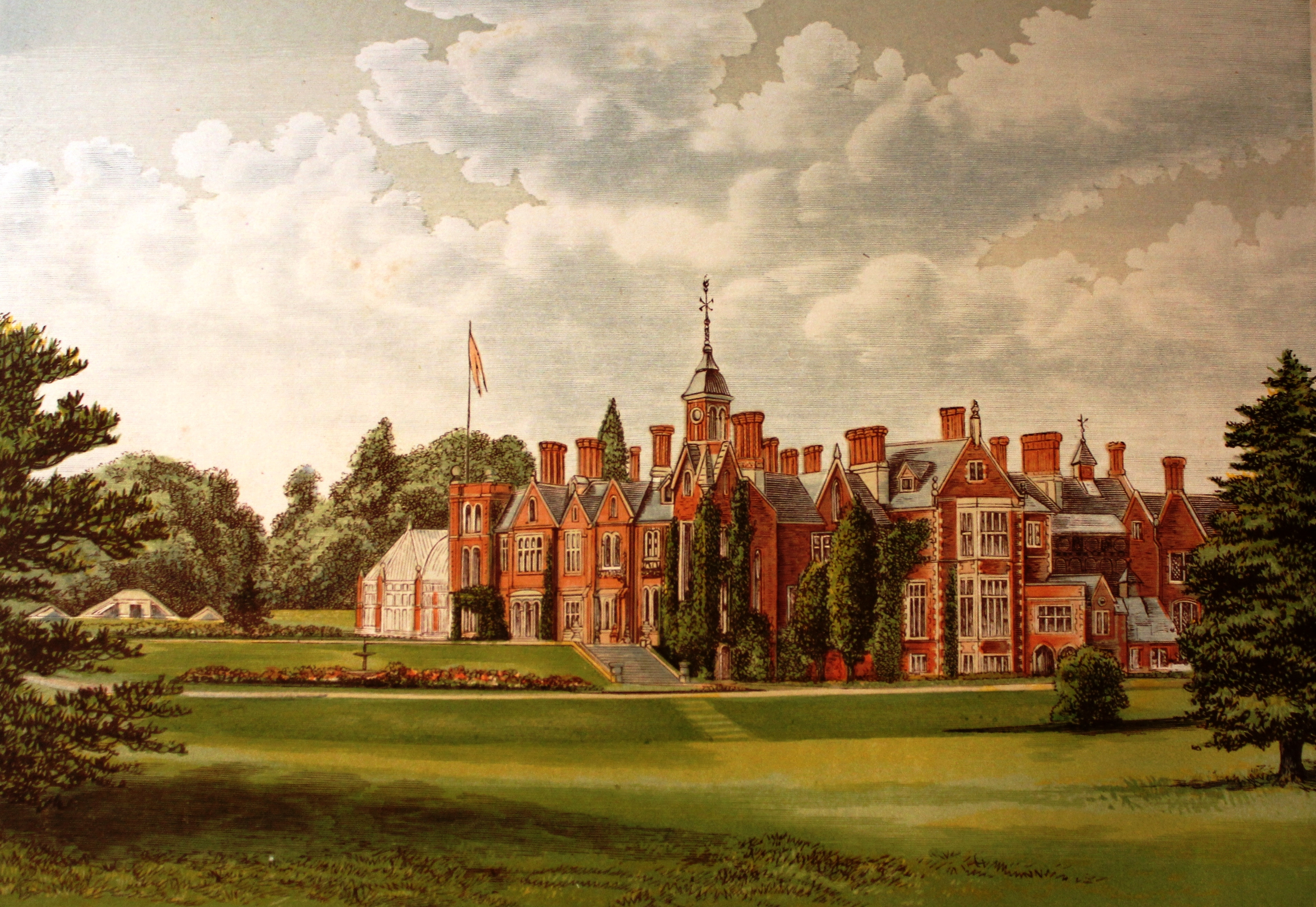
Woodblock print of The Hendre

Rolls was responsible for extending the size of The Hendre using the services of Thomas Henry Wyatt. His architect created a new open roofed entrance hall for the building and the south wing and the park were improved. In 1877 Wyatt was again employed to add rooms for billiards, dining and smoking, as well as a coach house to replace the demolished old stables.

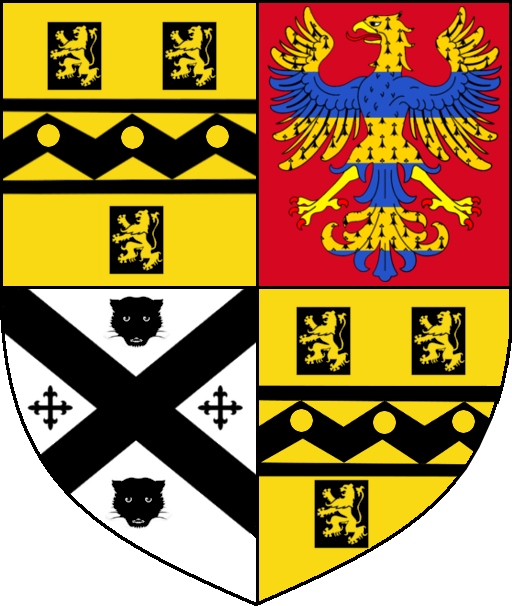
Coat of arms of John Etherington Welch Rolls

In 1863 Rolls' long service as a deputy was rewarded when he was made the Provincial Grand Master of the Freemasons in Monmouthshire.

Rolls collected art including sketches by Henry Fuseli and illuminated manuscripts. Some of the sketches are now in the possession of Indiana University and others are in the British Museum.

It was proposed that "a cattle show" should be created in Monmouth, and in 1857 the eighth Duke of Beaufort and Rolls each put money into a thirty-pound fund to start the Monmouth Cattle Show in October of the same year. Rolls was the greater financial contributor and he became President of the show until his death. This cattle show, still in existence, is now known as the Monmouthshire Show. Rolls also served as the President of the charity that ran The Dispensary which provided out-patient and hospital care for the poor people of Monmouth. He gave £1,000 to fund a hospital bed in perpetuity at that establishment.

Rolls' daughters, Elizabeth Harcourt, Patty, Anne Katherine and Ellen, all married well; Georgina Emily married Thomas Chester-Master who was a Conservative MP whilst Rolls' third daughter Mary Octavia Rolls did not marry.

After a long illness, Rolls died in 1870, and at All Saints' Church in Llanfrechfa in Monmouthshire a medieval preaching cross was rebuilt in his memory by his daughter Elizabeth and her husband Frank Johnstone Mitchell. He was succeeded by his son John Rolls, 1st Baron Llangattock.

== Family tree ==
John Rolls (1735–1801)	Nemuel Kessler (d. 1801)
John Rolls of The Hendre (1776–1837)	Martha Barnett
John Etherington Welch Rolls (1807–70)	Elizabeth Mary Long
John Allan Rolls (1837–1912)	Georgiana Marcia Maclean (1837 – 1923)
John Maclean Rolls (1870–1916)	Henry Alan Rolls (1871–1916)	Eleanor Georgiana Rolls (1872–1961)	Charles Stewart Rolls (1877–1910) (co-founder of Rolls-Royce)

Honorary titles
Preceded by Samuel Homfray	Sheriff of Monmouthshire; 1842–1843	Succeeded by Sir Digby Mackworth, 4th Baronet
