= John Rolls, 1st Baron Llangattock =

Welsh nobleman

The Right Honourable The Lord Llangattock
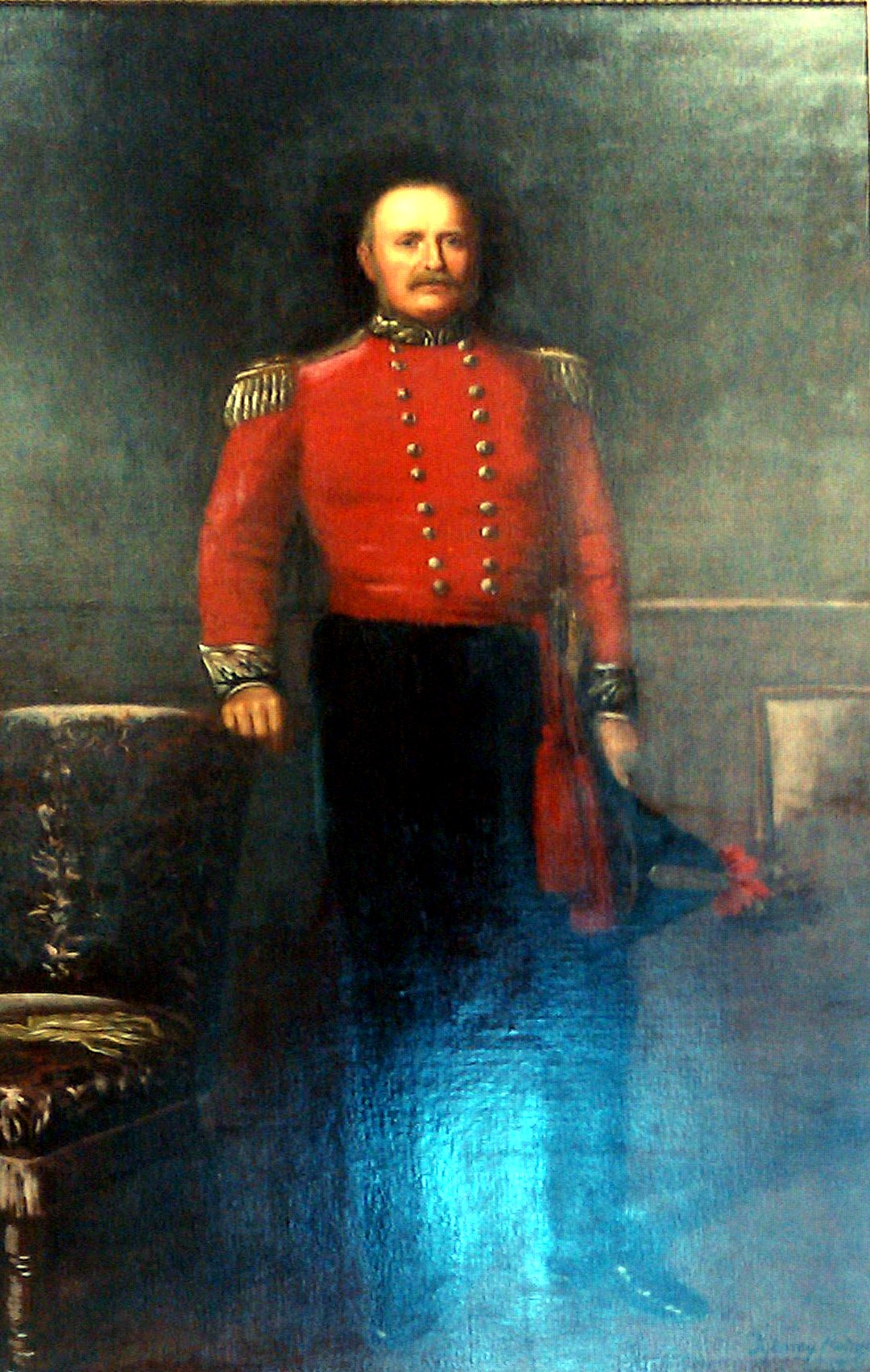
- Portrait in The Rolls Hall, Monmouth
- Born: 19 February 1837
- Died: 24 September 1912 (aged 75)
- Political party: Conservative
- Spouse: Georgiana
- Children: John Rolls, 2nd Baron Llangattock
- Parent: John Etherington Welch Rolls

Arms of Rolls of The Hendre, near Monmouth, Barons Llangattock: Or, on a fesse dancettée with plain cotises between three billets sable each charged with a lion rampant of the field, as many bezants. Motto: Celeritas et veritas.

John Allan Rolls, 1st Baron Llangattock, DL (19 February 1837 – 24 September 1912) was a British landowner, Conservative Party politician, socialite, local benefactor and agriculturalist. He lived at The Hendre, a Victorian country house north of Monmouth.

== Biography ==
He was the only son of John Etherington Welch Rolls and his wife Elizabeth Mary Long. Elizabeth was a daughter of Walter Long of Preshaw and granddaughter of William Carnegie, 7th Earl of Northesk.

Rolls was educated at Eton College and Christ Church, Oxford, later becoming Captain in the Royal Gloucestershire Hussars Yeomanry Cavalry, and was afterwards appointed honorary colonel of the 1st Monmouthshire Artillery Volunteers, later 4th Welsh Brigade Royal Field Artillery

In 1868 he married Georgiana Marcia Maclean in London. She was the daughter of Sir Charles Fitzroy Maclean, 9th Baronet, of Morvaren (1798–1883). They lived at The Hendre and they also had a house South Lodge which was at Rutland Gate in London. They had four children:

- John Maclean Rolls (1870–1916) 2nd Baron Llangattock; who died unmarried, killed in action.
- Henry Allen Rolls (1871–1916)
- Eleanor Georgiana Rolls (1872–1961) later the Hon. Lady Shelley-Rolls. She became a leading campaigner for women in engineering, a signatory of the foundation documents of the Women's Engineering Society, co-founded Atlanta Co Ltd. and worked on campaigns towards the electrification of Britain. She married on 23 April 1898 Sir John Courtown Edward Shelley, later Shelley-Rolls, 6th Baronet, of Castle Goring, Sussex (5 August 1871 – 18 February 1951) and great-nephew of the poet Percy Shelley. In 1917, her husband assumed by Royal Licence the additional surname of Rolls in compliance with the will of his father-in-law, the late Lord Llangattock. However, there were no children of the marriage, and The Hendre eventually passed out of the hands of the Rolls family in the 1980s, having passed through the Harding-Rolls line of the family.
- Charles Stewart Rolls (1877–1910) of Rolls-Royce fame and the first British aircraft fatality.

Rolls was appointed High Sheriff of Monmouthshire in 1875, and served as MP for Monmouthshire from 1880 to 1885. In 1892 he was raised to the peerage as Baron Llangattock, of The Hendre in the County of Monmouth. He served as Mayor of Monmouth 1896 - 1897, and his gifts to that town included a large public hall, a gymnasium, and an isolation hospital. In April 1901 he received the Honorary Freedom of the Borough of Monmouth 'in recognition of his many benefactions to the town'. He was also a magistrate and Deputy Lieutenant of that county.

Lord Llangattock was a Freemason, rising to the position of Provincial Grand Master in 1894. The Masonic Llangattock Lodge (No.2547) was created in his honour in 1895 and took the Rolls motto, Celerias et Veritas (Speed and Truth). He was a fellow of the Society of Antiquaries and restored several Monmouthshire churches at his own expense.

He was a breeder of Shire horses and acquired a reputation amongst agriculturalists for his shorthorn and Hereford cattle and Shropshire breeds of sheep. In 1903 he was President of the Shire Horse Society, whose show was visited by King Edward VII that year.

Lord Llangattock's elevation to the peerage confirmed his elevation to the top rank of society. In late October - early November 1900 the Duke and Duchess of York (later King George V and Queen Mary) stayed with Rolls at the Hendre.

Lord Llangattock died on 24 September 1912. He was succeeded by his eldest son, John Rolls, 2nd Baron Llangattock, who died of wounds received at the Battle of the Somme in 1916.

== Anti-vivisection ==
Llangattock was a hunter but an anti-vivisectionist. He was a vice-president of the British Union for the Abolition of Vivisection. He was a prominent member of the Anti-Vivisection Society, a position that caused some controversy as illustrated by a letter of June, 1901 published in the British Medical Journal:

SIR,-I see that Lord Llangattock, who presided at the annual meeting of the Antivivisection Society on 9 May, gave credence to 'the horrible stories of what takes place in the laboratories of physiology,' denounced vivisection as 'misleading, immoral, and degrading,' and professed 'a sentiment for animals.' Now, I recollect reading in the newspapers last autumn a description of a battue on a large scale, given by Lord Llangattock at his place in Wales, at which a phenomenal number of pheasants were shot for the recreation of Lord Llangattock and his friends, and I should like him to study this little picture of his own dealings with animals, for which he has 'a sentiment' drawn not by a vivisector, but by a man who is a keen and trustworthy observer, and who is in genuine sympathy with all sentient beings.

== Family tree ==
John Rolls (1735–1801)	Sarah Coysh (d. 1801)
John Rolls of The Hendre (1776–1837)	Martha Maria Barnett (1780-1858)
John Etherington Welch Rolls (1807–70)	Elizabeth Mary Long (1813-79)
John Allan Rolls (1837–1912)	Georgiana Marcia Maclean (1837 – 1923)
John Maclean Rolls (1870–1916)	Henry Allen Rolls (1871–1916)	Eleanor Georgiana Rolls (1872–1961)	Charles Stewart Rolls (1877–1910) (co-founder of Rolls-Royce)

== Gallery ==
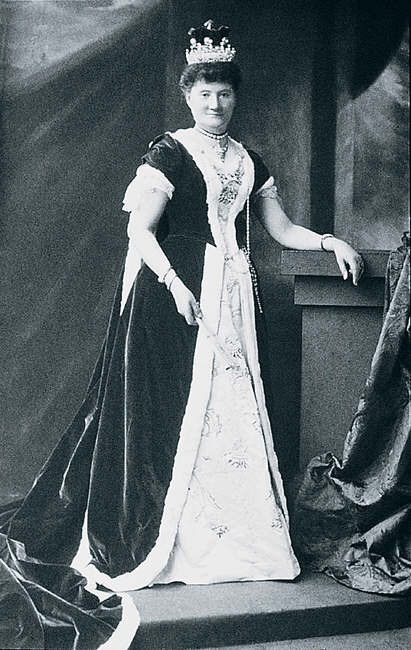
Lady Llangattock at the Coronation

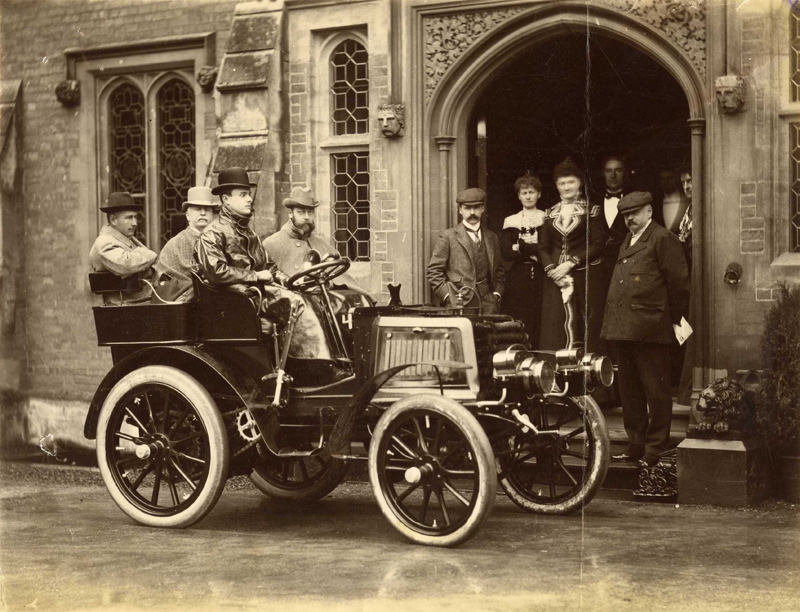
The Duke of York, Lord and Lady Llangattock, Sir Charles Cust and C.S. Rolls at 'The Hendre', 1900

Parliament of the United Kingdom
Preceded by Lord Henry Somerset and Frederic Morgan	Member for Monmouthshire; 1880 – 1885; With: Frederic Morgan 1874-85	Constituency divided
Peerage of the United Kingdom
New creation	Baron Llangattock; 1892–1916	Succeeded by John Rolls
