= Kingsley House and Hendre House, Monmouth =

Houses in Monmouth, Wales

Kingsley House and Hendre House
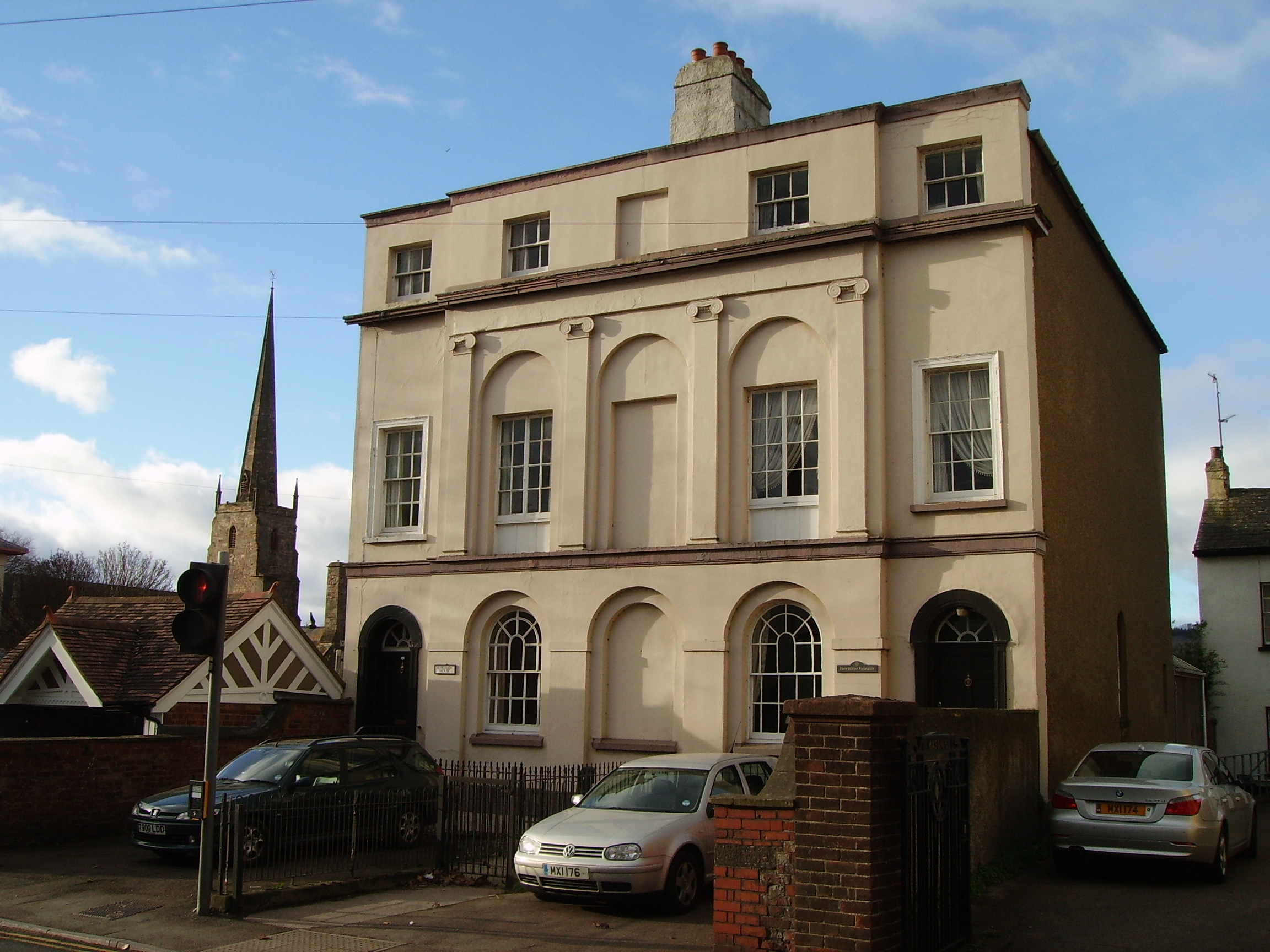
- Kingsley House and Hendre House
- Interactive map of the Kingsley House and Hendre House area

General information
- Location: Monmouth, Monmouthshire, Wales, 8 Monk Street; 10 Monk Street
- Coordinates: 51.80908°N 2.7119°W

Design and construction
- Architect: George Vaughan Maddox
- Designations: Grade II Listed

Kingsley House and Hendre House are a pair of 19th-century, semi-detached houses on the North Parade section of Monk Street in Monmouth, Monmouthshire, Wales. The grade II listed houses were designed by noted Monmouth architect and builder George Vaughan Maddox, who also designed at least two of the twenty-four blue plaque buildings on the Monmouth Heritage Trail, including the Market Hall and the Monmouth Methodist Church. Hendre House should be distinguished from The Hendre, the estate of the Rolls family.

== History and design ==
Kingsley House at 8 Monk Street and Hendre House at 10 Monk Street are a pair of early 19th-century, listed houses. The semi-detached houses together are in a three-storey building with a five-bay elevation. The exterior features a stucco finish, and there is a hipped slate roof. The centre window bay of each of the three floors of the building is blocked. The windows on the ground floor are round-headed, and those on the uppermost floor are smaller than those on the ground and middle floors. The entrance to each house features a round-headed doorway with a six-paneled door and radiating fanlight (transom).

Both dwellings were designed by George Vaughan Maddox, a Monmouth native who was an architect and builder. Maddox, who also designed Priory Street in Monmouth, resided at Kingsley House on nearby Monk Street during the time that Priory Street was planned and constructed. Not only was Maddox responsible for Priory Street and its Market Hall, which was completed in 1839, the prolific architect also designed a number of other notable buildings, including the Monmouth Methodist Church in St James Street, the Masonic Hall in Monk Street, and Oak House at 6 Monk Street. The Market Hall and the Monmouth Methodist Church are two of the twenty-four blue plaque buildings on the Monmouth Heritage Trail. Maddox also designed Croft-Y-Bwla for Thomas Dyke, a Monmouth grocer. George Maddox was the son of James Maddox, another Monmouth architect and builder, who died in Monmouth in 1820.

In 1934, Kelly's Directory of Monmouthshire indicated that John James Furney resided at Kingsley House. In Summer 2025 Hendre House was for sale.

Kingsley House and Hendre House stand on the west side of the North Parade section of Monk Street (north of the intersection of Monk Street with Priory Street and New Dixton Road). On 27 October 1965, both houses were listed at Grade II. Hendre House should be distinguished from The Hendre, the childhood home of Charles Stewart Rolls, co-founder of Rolls-Royce Limited and aviation pioneer. The grade II* listed, Victorian country house at Llangattock-Vibon-Avel now functions as the clubhouse of the Rolls of Monmouth Golf Club. George Vaughan Maddox also served as an architect and builder for The Hendre, performing the first of the expansions of the mansion that were commissioned by three generations of the Rolls family. Originally a hunting lodge, The Hendre underwent reconstruction of portions of its south wing in 1830, performed by Maddox for John Rolls (1776-1837), great-grandfather of Charles.
