= 1–6 Priory Street, Monmouth =

1–6 Priory Street
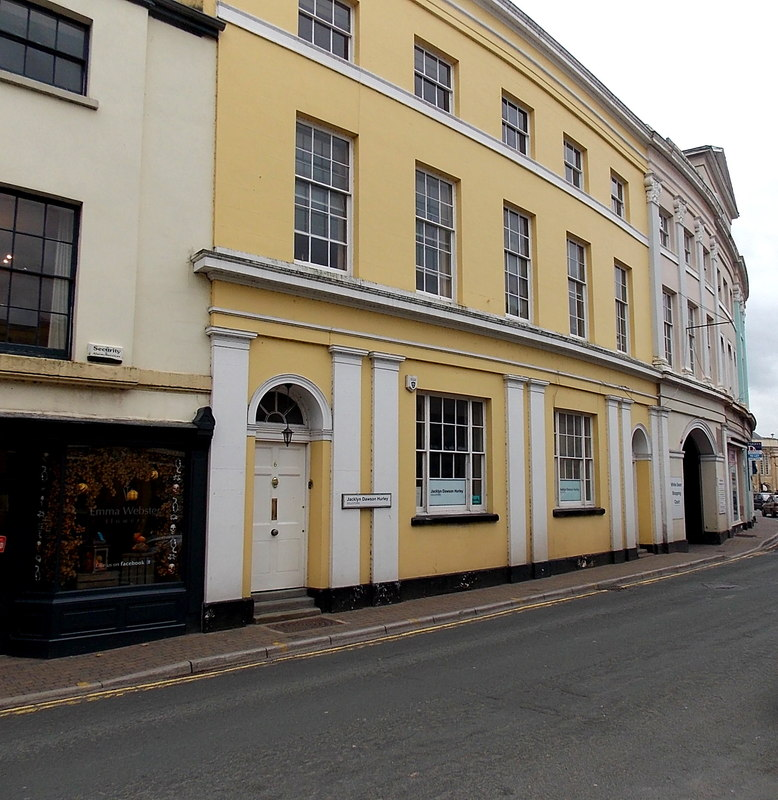
- 1–6 Priory Street, from No.6

- Location within Monmouthshire
- 51.8127°N 2.7153°W
- Type: Shops / Houses
- Location: Monmouth, Monmouthshire

History
- Built: c. 1837

Site notes
- Architect: George Vaughan Maddox
- Architectural style: Neoclassical
- Governing body: Privately owned

Listed Building – Grade II*
- Official name: 1, 2, 3, 4, 5 & 6 Priory Street
- Designated: 10 August 2005
- Reference no.: 2320, 85057, 85096, 85123, 85135 & 85148

1–6 Priory Street in Monmouth, Wales, is a row of six shop houses designed by the architect George Vaughan Maddox and constructed c. 1837. They form part of Maddox's redevelopment of the centre of Monmouth and stand opposite his Market Hall. The architectural historian John Newman has written that Maddox's work "gives Monmouth its particular architectural flavour," and considers Priory Street to be "his greatest work."

== History ==
In the early 19th century, the main thoroughfare out of Monmouth towards London was Church Street, a relatively narrow street now pedestrianised. Increasing traffic on the street led to a number of accidents and demands for the construction of a new road. At the same time, developments at the Shire Hall in Agincourt Square meant that the market, previously located there, required new accommodation. In 1834, the Town Council offered a prize for a redevelopment scheme, which was won by George Vaughan Maddox. Maddox, the son of another Monmouthshire architect, John Maddox, had already established a reputation within the town. Maddox's proposals envisaged a new road, described by John Newman as "a remarkably early inner bypass", that would run north of Church Street along the west bank of the River Monnow. Above the embankment side would stand slaughterhouses, supporting the new Market Hall, and facing the Hall, a row of grand residential houses, backing on to Swan Court. The road was called Priory Street, as its course ran next to Monmouth Priory on the route from the centre of the town.

== Architecture and description ==
Numbers 1–6 Priory Street form a curved, symmetrical frontage at the beginning of Priory Street as it runs north-east from Agincourt Square. The whole block is of three storeys and nineteen bays. The frontage is stuccoed, and decorated with pilasters, typical of Maddox's "good facades." The roofline has a central attic, under a pediment and lit by a shallow window. The architectural historian John Newman, in his Gwent/Monmouthshire volume of Pevsners Buildings of Wales, notes that Maddox's work gives the town of Monmouth its "particular architectural flavour" and considers Priory Street "his finest work".

The composite grouping has been designated a Grade II* listed building for "its exceptional architectural interest as part of an important piece of early 19th century town planning."

== Sources ==
- Heath, Charles (1804). Historical and descriptive accounts of the ancient and present state of the town of Monmouth. Monmouth: Charles Heath. OCLC 18491234.
- Kissack, Keith (1975). Monmouth: The Making Of A County Town. Chichester: Phillimore. ISBN 0-85033-209-5.
- Kissack, Keith (2003). Monmouth and its Buildings. Woonton Almeley: Logaston Press. ISBN 1-904396-01-1. OCLC 55143853.
- Newman, John (2000). Gwent/Monmouthshire. The Buildings of Wales. London: Penguin. ISBN 0-14-071053-1.
