= Helen Barry =

English actress (1840–1904)

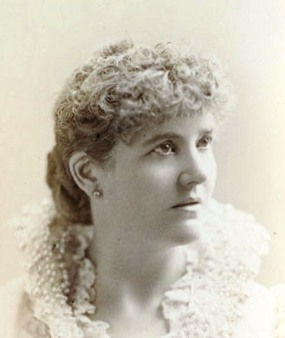
- Born: Elizabeth Short; 5 January 1840; Lee, Kent, England, U.K.
- Died: 20 July 1904 (aged 64); Norwalk, Connecticut, U.S.
- Occupation: Actress
- Spouses: Joseph Brandon (m. 1855; div. 1876) Alexander Rolls (m. 1877; died 1882) Harry George Bolam (m. 1883; died 1883)

Helen Barry (born Elizabeth Short, 5 January 1840 – 20 July 1904) was an English actress. She began her acting career at age 32 after her first marriage dissolved.

She performed leading roles in West End theatres in the 1870s in comedy, drama and Victorian burlesque and remarried in 1877 to Alexander Rolls, the former Mayor of Monmouth, briefly moving to Wales. But she was acting in London again by 1880, and her husband died in 1882. Barry soon remarried and moved to America, where she was again widowed within a year. She continued her stage career, both in New York and London, for more than a decade thereafter.

== Childhood and first marriage ==
Barry was born as Elizabeth Short in Lee, now a suburb of London but then a village in the county of Kent; she was the daughter of Charles Henry Short and his wife Mary. Elizabeth married Joseph Brandon, a Belgian, on 3 May 1855 when she was fifteen years old. The ceremony took place at the Parish Church of Saint Luke, Charlton, Kent. Her daughter, Esther E. Brandon, was born in Greenwich, Kent in the second quarter of 1855, around the time of the marriage. On 2 June 1870, the marriage was dissolved at Westminster, upon the petition of Joseph Brandon. Esther had been put out as an apprentice by 1871. The divorce was finalised on 29 February 1876.

== Early theatrical career ==
Barry first appeared on stage as Princess Fortinbrasse in Dion Boucicault and James Planché's Babil and Bijou at the Theatre Royal, Covent Garden in 1872. She also appeared there in This Evening at Seven. She was then at the Royal Court Theatre until 1873. In March of that year she created the role of Selene, the fairy queen, in The Happy Land, a successful Victorian burlesque by W. S. Gilbert and Gilbert Arthur à Beckett. Later that year, she took the role of Margaret Hayes in Tom Taylor's play, Arkwright's Wife, at the Theatre Royal in Leeds. When the piece moved to the Globe Theatre in London, Barry moved with it. The Times wrote that she "has all the force required by the arduous character of Margaret, and she expresses the tenderer emotions with good effect".

Barry next took on the role of Edith Dombey in a play called Heart's Delight, adapted from Dombey and Son. She played at the Gaiety Theatre, London, as Armande in Led Astray by Boucicault, in 1874, before touring outside London briefly. She next took the lead in Around the World in 80 days at the Princess's Theatre in 1875. She played the leading role in Heartsease, a bowdlerized adaptation of Alexander Dumas fils's The Lady of the Camellias by James Mortimer, at the same theatre in 1875. In 1876, she appeared adaptations of two French plays at the Haymarket Theatre and the Standard Theatre, and in Lady Clancarty by Tom Taylor, and the next year she played in The Lady of Lyons and The School for Scandal. Other important roles in the 1870s included Lady Macbeth and Lady Teazle, both at the Theatre Royal, Edinburgh. She appeared in the breeches role of Abdallah in The Forty Thieves, a burlesque at the Gaiety Theatre, in 1878.

== Second marriage ==
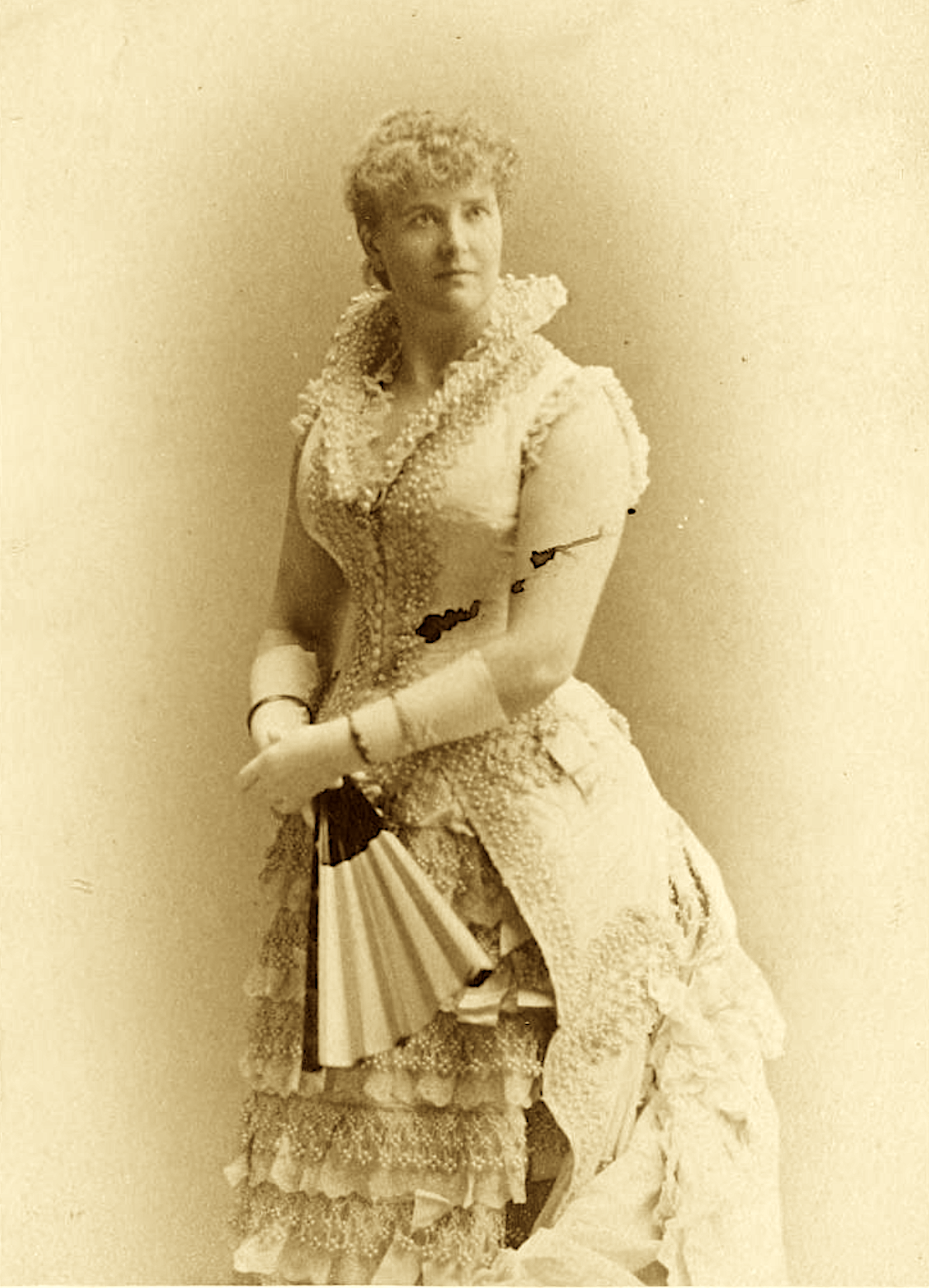
Helen Barry

The actress married widower Alexander Rolls, a man more than 20 years her elder, on 1 September 1877 at the Parish Church of St Mark at Regent's Park in Middlesex. The day prior to the ceremony, Rolls appeared before diocesan officials to sign an affidavit disclosing the details of Barry's prior marriage and divorce. The second son of John and Martha Rolls, Alexander Rolls was a Deputy Lieutenant of Monmouthshire, and had been elected to four terms as Mayor of Monmouth. As a young man, he had purchased his commission in the 4th Royal Irish Dragoon Guards, eventually reaching the rank of Major. Rolls's residence was Croft-y-bwla northwest of Monmouth, a house designed by the architect George Vaughan Maddox, where Rolls had lived with his first wife. Rolls and Barry lived together for a relatively short time at Croft-y-bwla, and he declared bankruptcy less than two years after their marriage. By 1881, he was living at Hanover Square, London, and she is not shown as residing with him in the 1881 census.

In 1880, Barry appeared in The World at the Theatre Royal, Drury Lane and as Mrs. Arabella Buster in Forbidden Fruits at the Adelphi Theatre.

== New York ==
Rolls died in London on 22 April 1882. Within one year of her husband's death, Barry was remarried and widowed again: by early 1883, she married Harry George Bolam, a land agent and mining engineer. The couple moved to New York where Bolam died suddenly of pneumonia on 23 March 1883. Barry made her first New York stage appearance two months later, reprising her role as Margaret in Arkwright's Wife. By 1886 she was in London, producing and acting in new plays such as The Esmondes of Virginia at the Royalty Theatre. In 1888, she appeared in A Woman of the World, an adaptation by B. C. Stephenson of Der Probpnfeil by Oscar Blumenthal, at the Haymarket Theatre, starring alongside Herbert Beerbohm Tree.

In 1889 Barry returned to New York, where she appeared in Love and Liberty at the Union Square Theatre. In 1891, she starred in and produced A Night's Frolic, by Augustus Thomas, at the Park Theatre in New York City. In 1892, she sued Rose Coghlan in New York State court for copyright infringement, claiming that Coghlan's play Dorothy's Dilemma appropriated whole scenes from her production. She was also involved in a court case in London that year but was acting in America in 1895.

Barry died on 20 July 1904 in the US in Norwalk, Connecticut, and her estate went to probate on 24 April 1906 in London.
