= George Vaughan Maddox =

19th c. British architect and builder

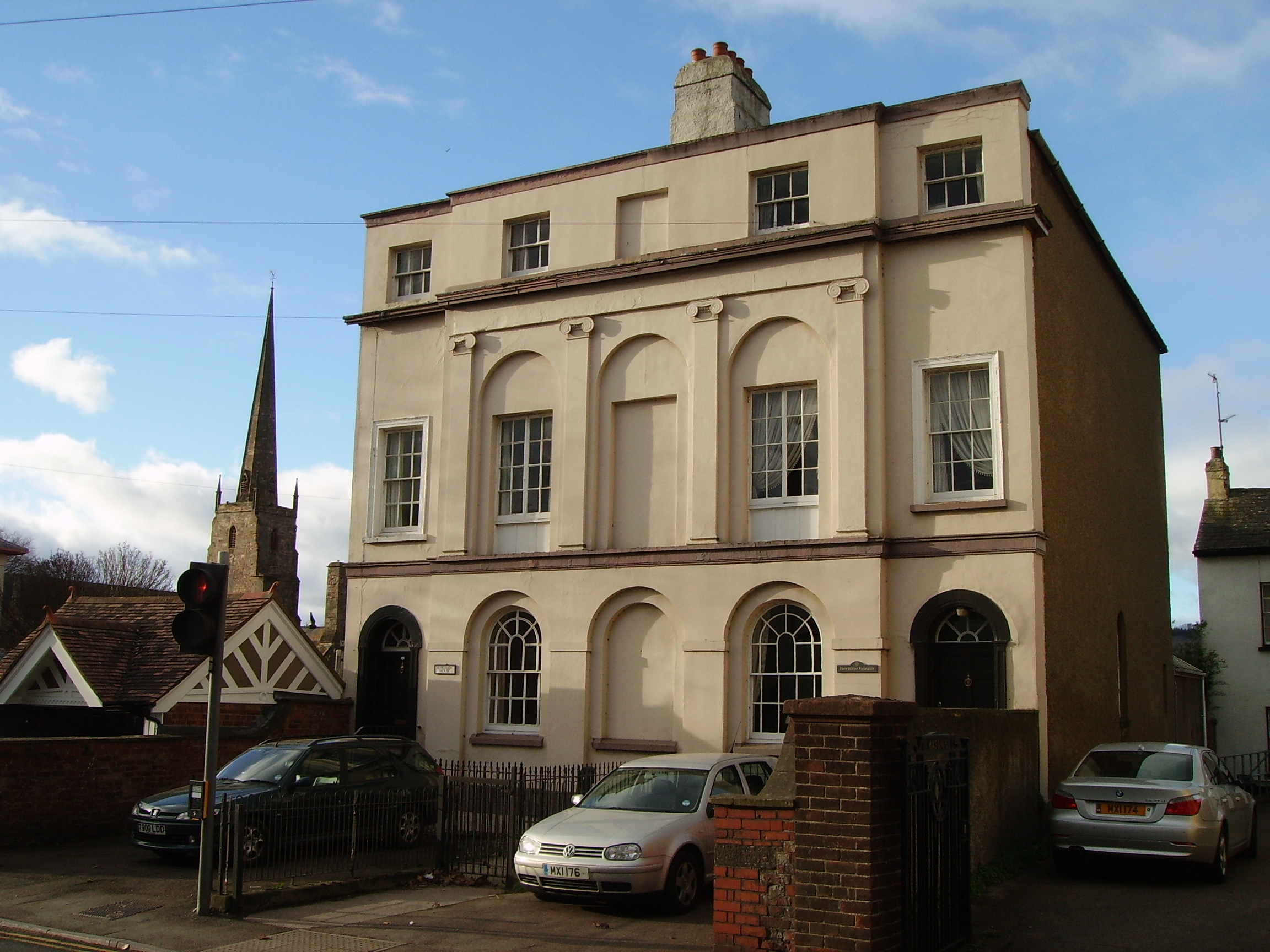
- Kingsley House (left), built to Maddox's design and his home for much of his life
- Born: 1802; Monmouth
- Died: 27 February 1864 (age 61/62); Hempsted, Gloucestershire
- Occupation: Architect
- Years active: 1820s–1840s

George Vaughan Maddox (1802–27 February 1864) was a nineteenth-century British architect and builder, whose work was undertaken principally in the town of Monmouth, Wales, and in the wider county. Working mainly in a Neo-Classical style, his extensive output made a significant contribution to the Monmouth townscape. The architectural historian John Newman considers that Monmouth owes to Maddox "its particular architectural flavour. For two decades from the mid-1820s he put up a sequence of public buildings and private houses in the town, in a style deft, cultured, and only occasionally unresolved." The Market Hall and 1-6 Priory Street are considered his "most important projects".

== Life and works ==
Maddox was born in 1802, the son of a builder, John Maddox, who also worked in the county. (Note: Keith Kissack, who suggests “Benjamin” as Maddox’s father’s forename, notes the difficulty in establishing a genealogy for the family. Describing them as “infidels” (non-attenders at the established church), he writes that the family “rarely appear in the parish registers. This makes their lineage difficult to disentangle.”) Howard Colvin suggests he was related to George Maddox. Maddox undertook a range of building commissions, including public works, churches and private domestic and commercial buildings.

=== Public works ===
Maddox designed some of Monmouth's most notable buildings including "his major work" the Market Hall. In the early 1830s, he won a competition organised by the borough council in Monmouth. The council had two main objectives: to relieve Church Street, then the major route into the town from the east, of through traffic; and to provide a new market hall, to allow the removal of the existing market from beneath the Shire Hall, enabling the expansion of that building to accommodate the new Assizes court. Maddox proposed a new carriage road running above the bank of the River Monnow, supported by a viaduct. The Market Hall, with a crescent-shaped frontage of Bath Stone in a Doric style, and an Ionic cupola and clerestory above the central part of the building, was built on one side of the road, and a long convex stuccoed frontage, 1-6 Priory Street, on the opposite side. A range of slaughterhouses, the Shambles, comprising 24 rooms with openings onto the river so that their waste would drain directly into it, were sited beneath the sandstone arches of the viaduct. The new road, now Priory Street, was opened in 1834, and the Market Hall in 1840. John Newman notes the ingenuity and innovation of Maddox's scheme, which created "a remarkably early inner bypass".

=== Churches ===
In Monmouth, Maddox designed the Methodist Church. The Victoria County History notes that Maddox undertook work at Hempsted, and Colvin suggests he undertook further ecclesiastical work at Clearwell, Gloucestershire. He drew up plans for the reconstruction of the interior of the Priory Church of St Mary, Abergavenny but these were not carried out. The local historian, Keith Kissack notes that Maddox designed new side galleries for St Mary’s in 1824 but this work was removed in George Edmund Street’s remodelling of the 1880s.

=== Private commissions ===
Maddox's domestic and commercial buildings in the town and environs include the Beaufort Arms Hotel, Pentwyn at Rockfield, which he built as his own residence in 1834–37; and Croft-y-Bwla, a villa midway between Monmouth and Rockfield which was the home of Alexander Rolls and his first wife Kate Steward Rolls. Further works include the Masonic Hall, Kingsley House and Hendre House, the former of which he designed as his own townhouse, Oak House, and, possibly, 18 St James Street. (Note: The attribution of No.18 to George Vaughan Maddox is uncertain. Cadw notes that the house is "said to have been designed by one of the Maddox family, but the doorway appears genuine 18th century." Keith Kissack notes that Charles Heath, the Monmouth antiquarian, attributed the house to Maddox, but suggests that it may be by one of his family, rather than George Vaughan.) (Note: Another instance of uncertainty as to which of the Maddox family may have been responsible for a structural design is the temple in the Nelson Garden on Monnow Street. The Nelson Garden Trust suggests George Maddox (1760-1843) as a possible designer and a construction date in the 1840s. Cadw considers the building to be roughly contemporary with its house, No.18 Monnow, Street, which would place it very late in the 18th or very early in the 19th centuries, and suggests the property's owner, Philip Meakins Hardwick, as the likely designer. Philip Bly, in his Guide to the complete Monmouth Heritage Blue Plaque Trail, suggests there were in fact two temples, and posits George Vaughan Maddox as the designer of the 1840's replacement. Newman does not suggest an architect but does comment on the structure's "most eccentric" design.)

Within the wider county, he undertook a limited early re-building of The Hendre, and carried out work in Commercial Street, Pontypool. Cadw suggests that Maddox was also the architect of the main block of Piercefield House, near Chepstow, working to designs by Sir John Soane. Given the date of Maddox's birth, and the construction period for Piercefield, this seems unlikely. Newman follows the more conventional attribution to Soane himself.

Maddox died at Hempsted Rectory, Gloucestershire on 27 February 1864. (Note: Howard Colvin records that Maddox's brother-in-law was the vicar at Hempsted.)

== Gallery ==
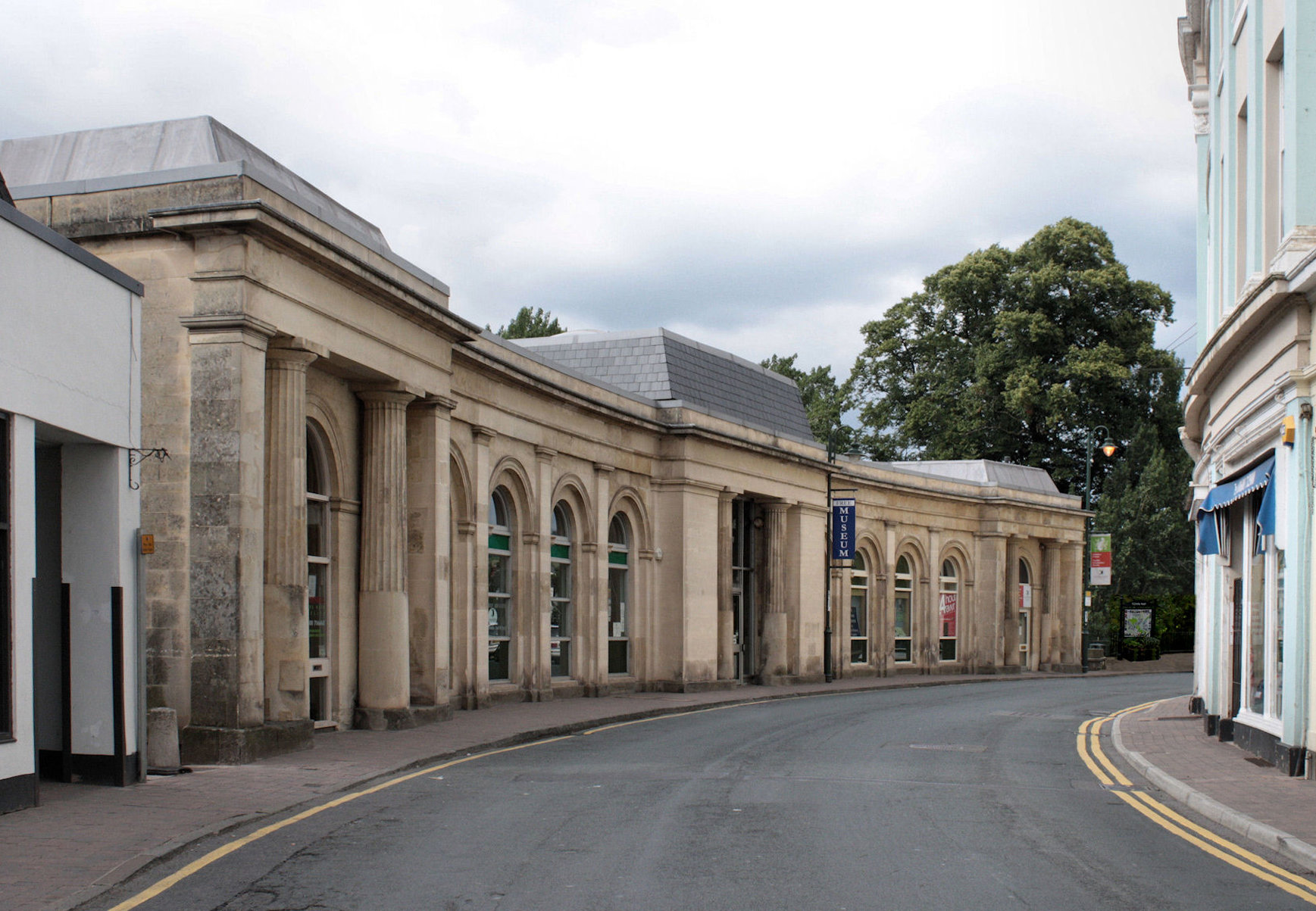
The Market Hall in Priory Street, Monmouth

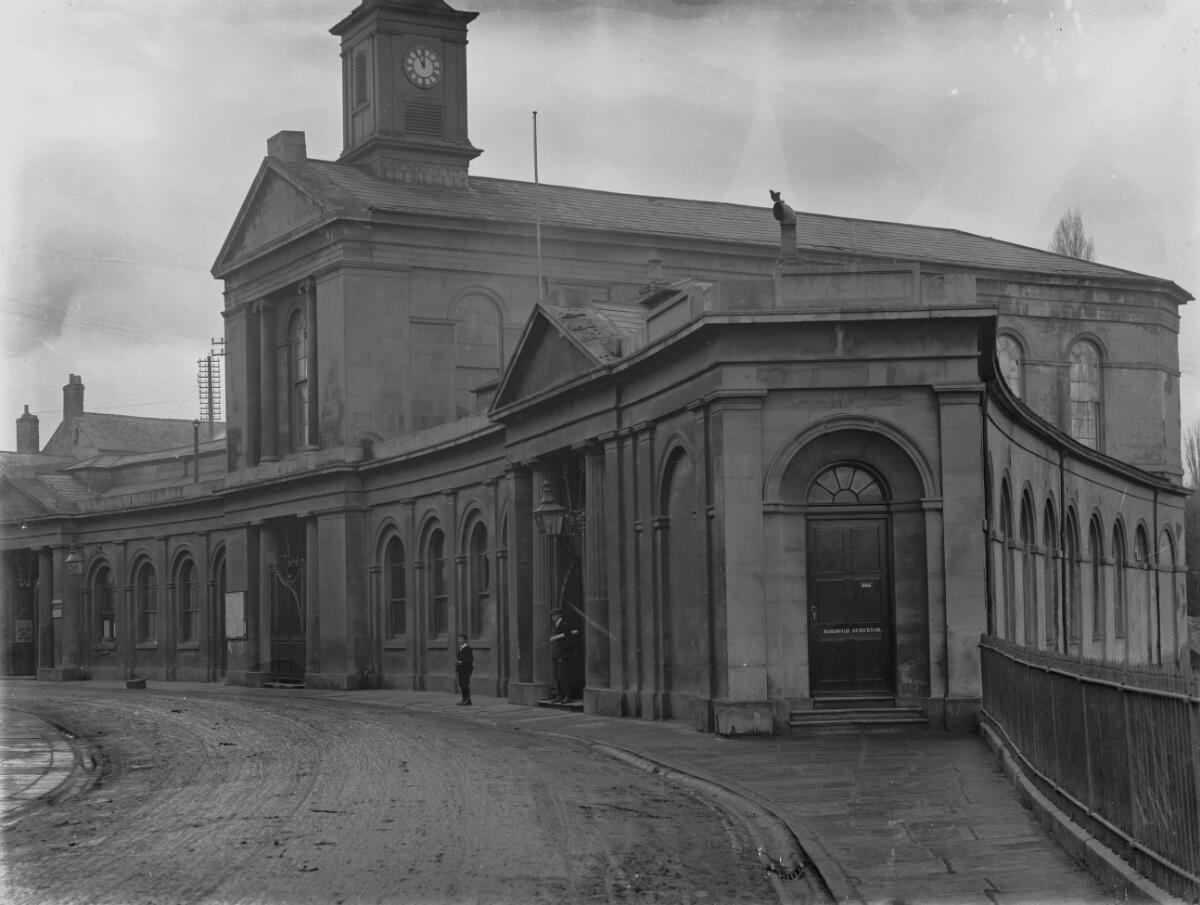
The Market Hall c.1905, prior to the loss of the upper storey and the cupola in a fire in 1963

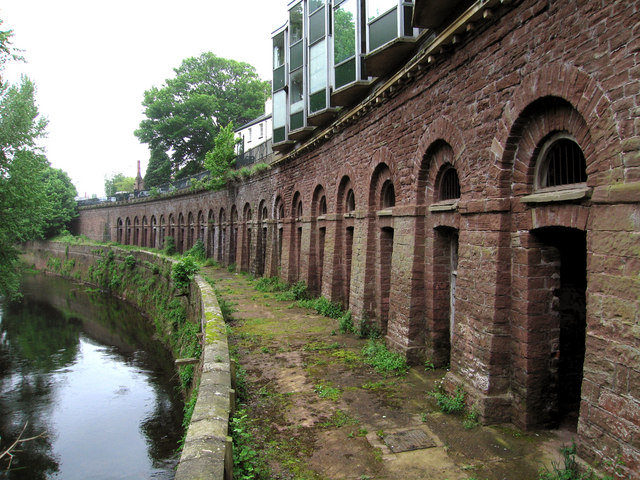
The Shambles (slaughterhouses) beneath the Market Hall

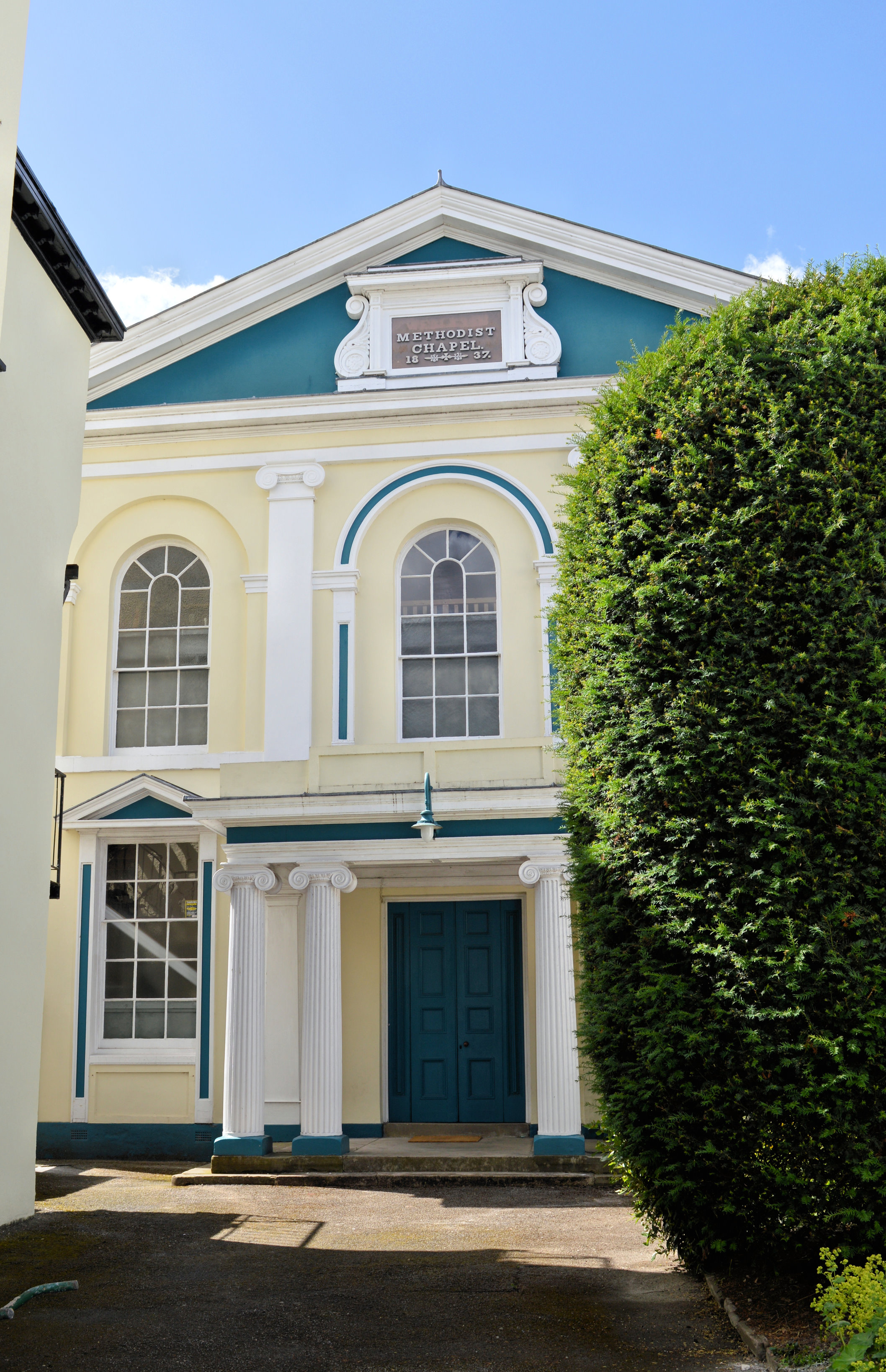
Monmouth Methodist Church

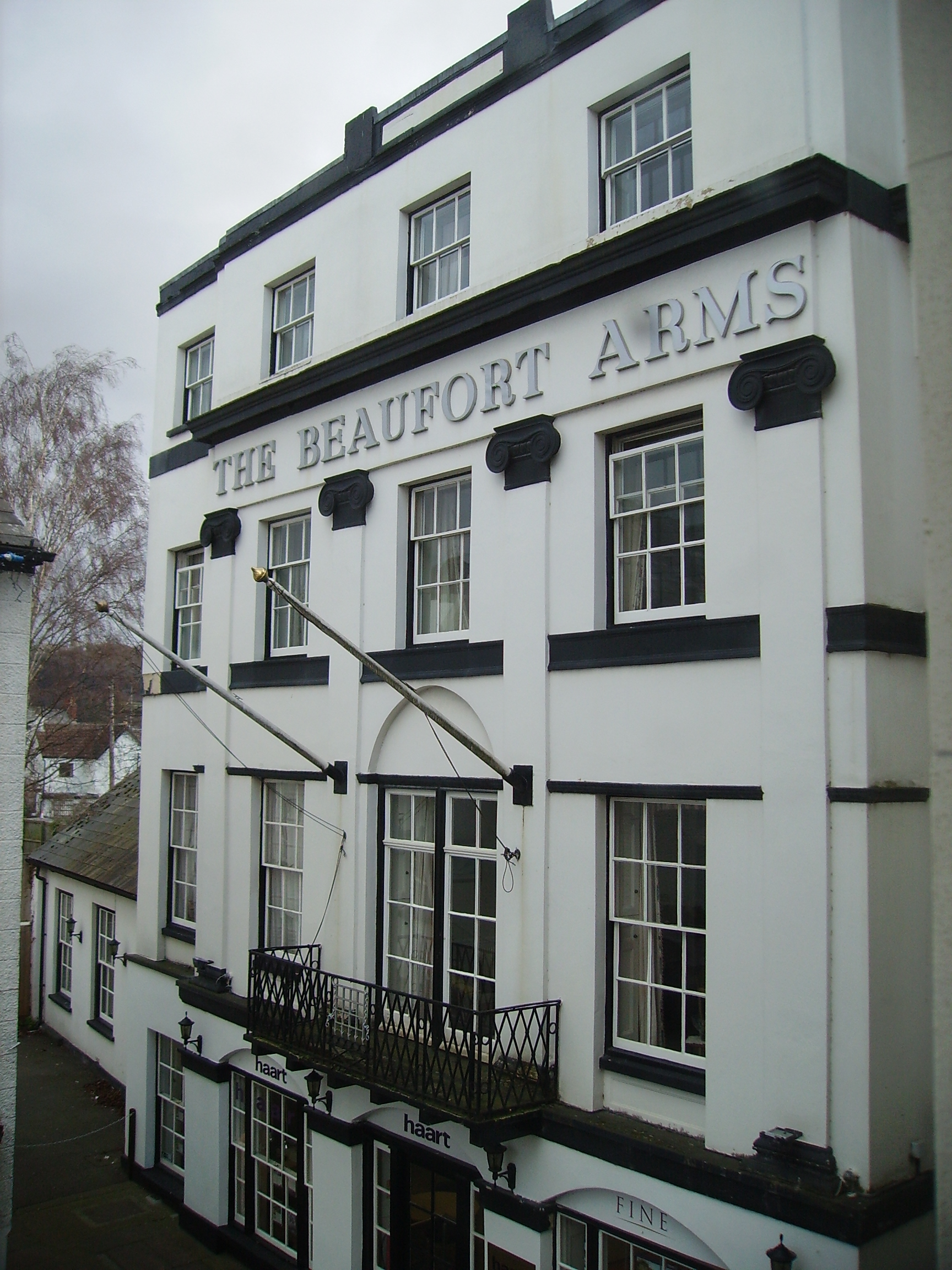
Beaufort Arms Hotel

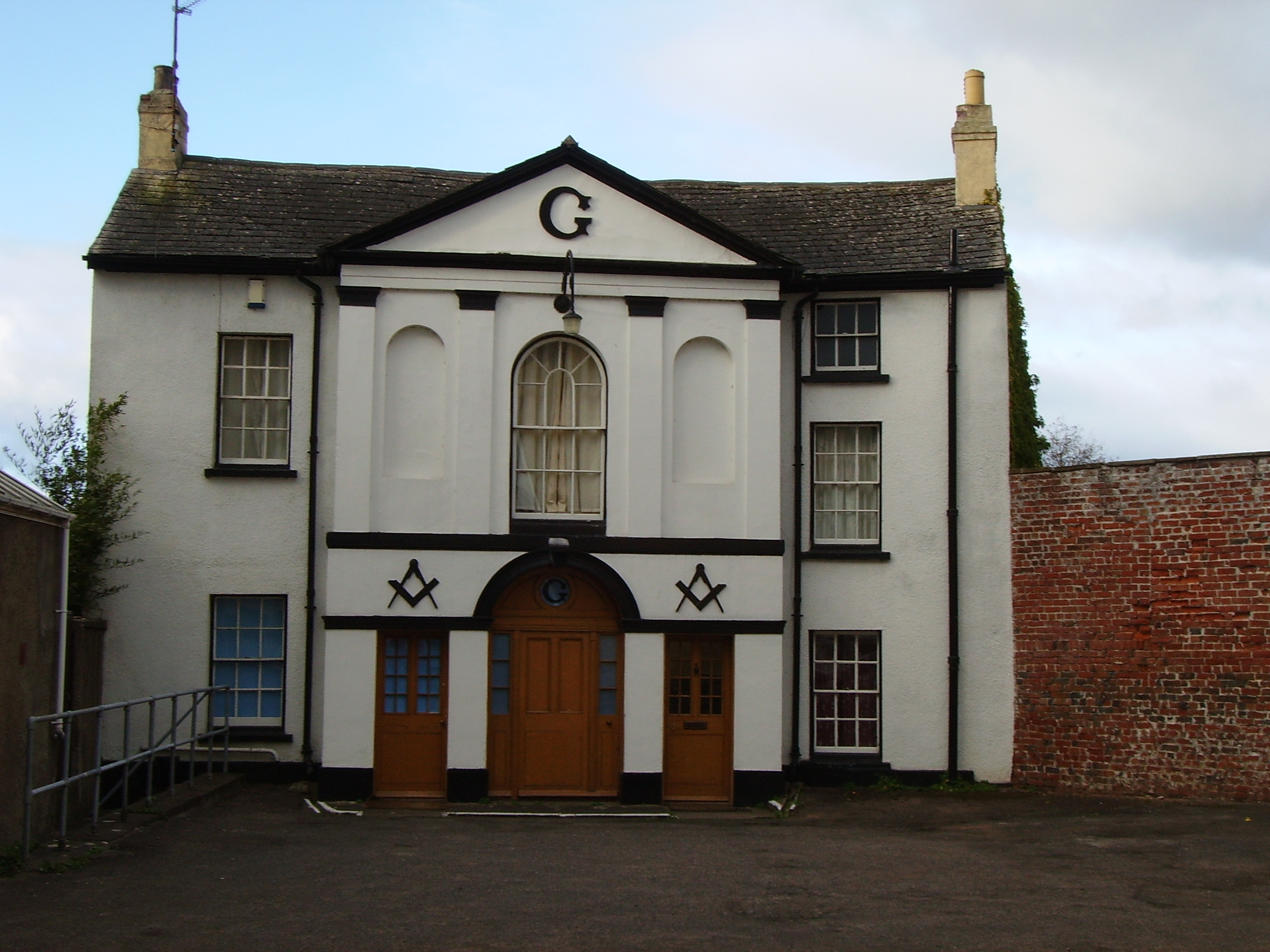
The Masonic Hall

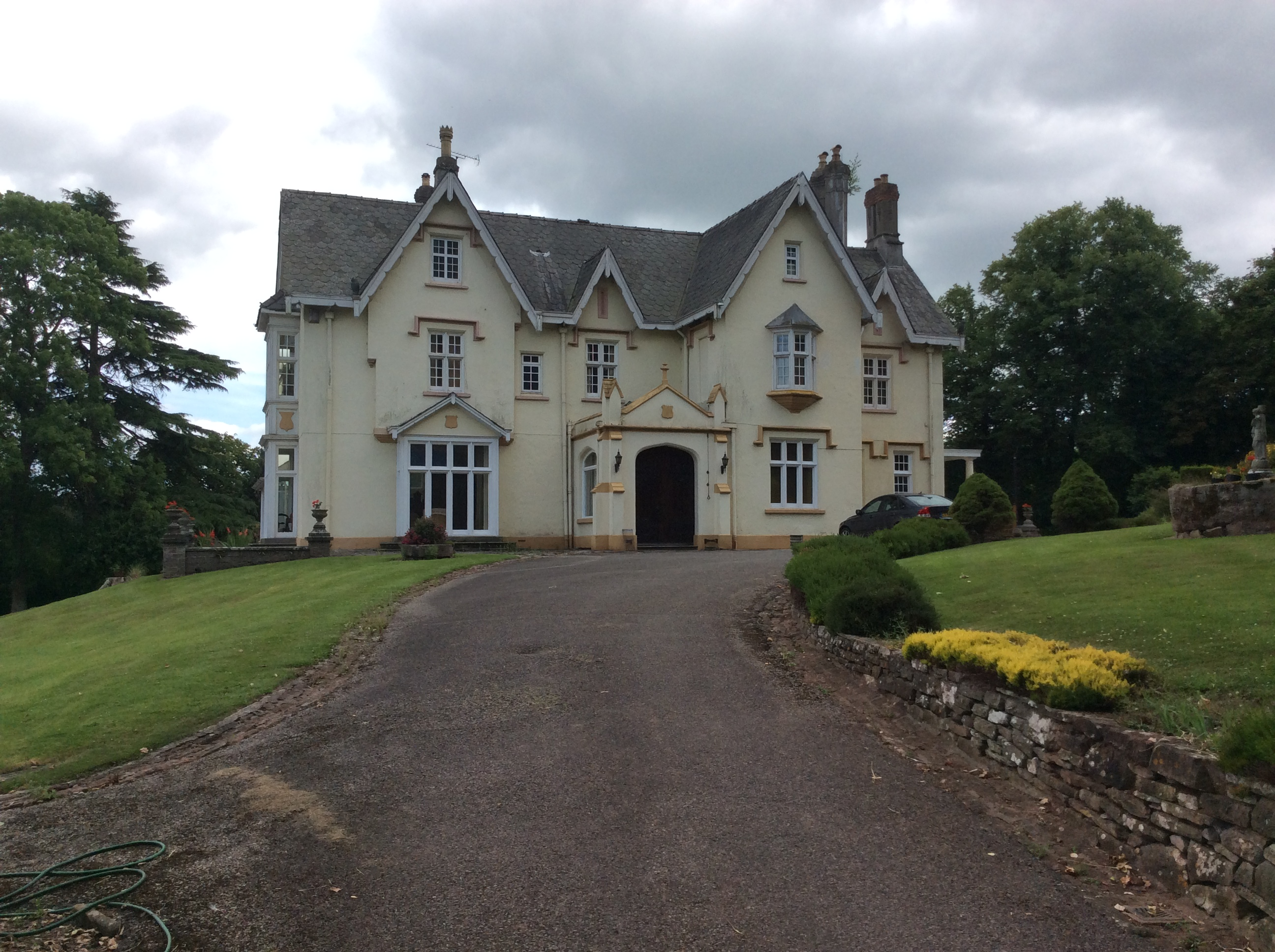
Pentwyn - Maddox's house at Rockfield

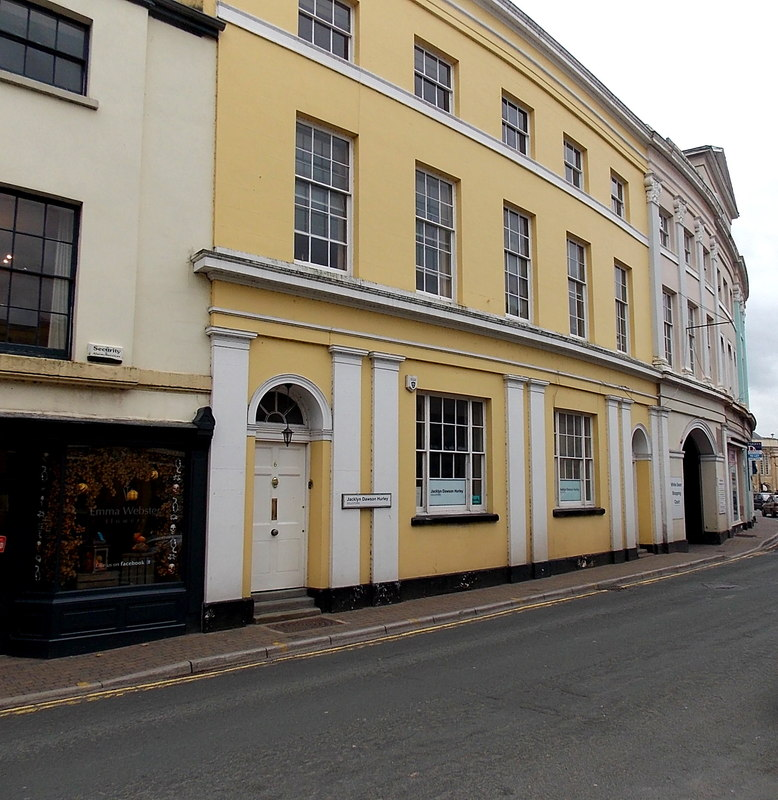
1–6 Priory Street - Maddox's "remarkably early inner by-pass"

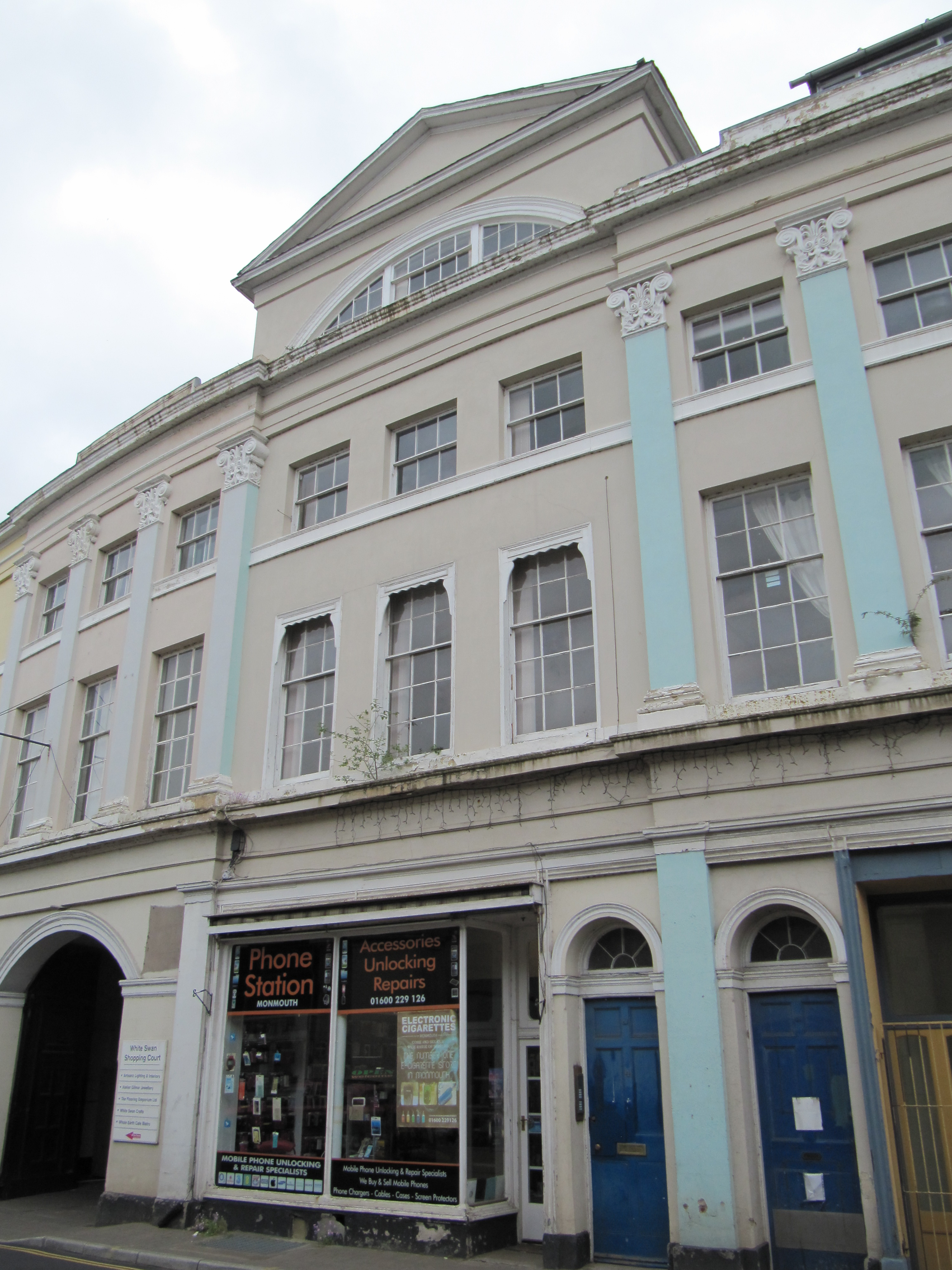
The central block of 1-6 Priory Street

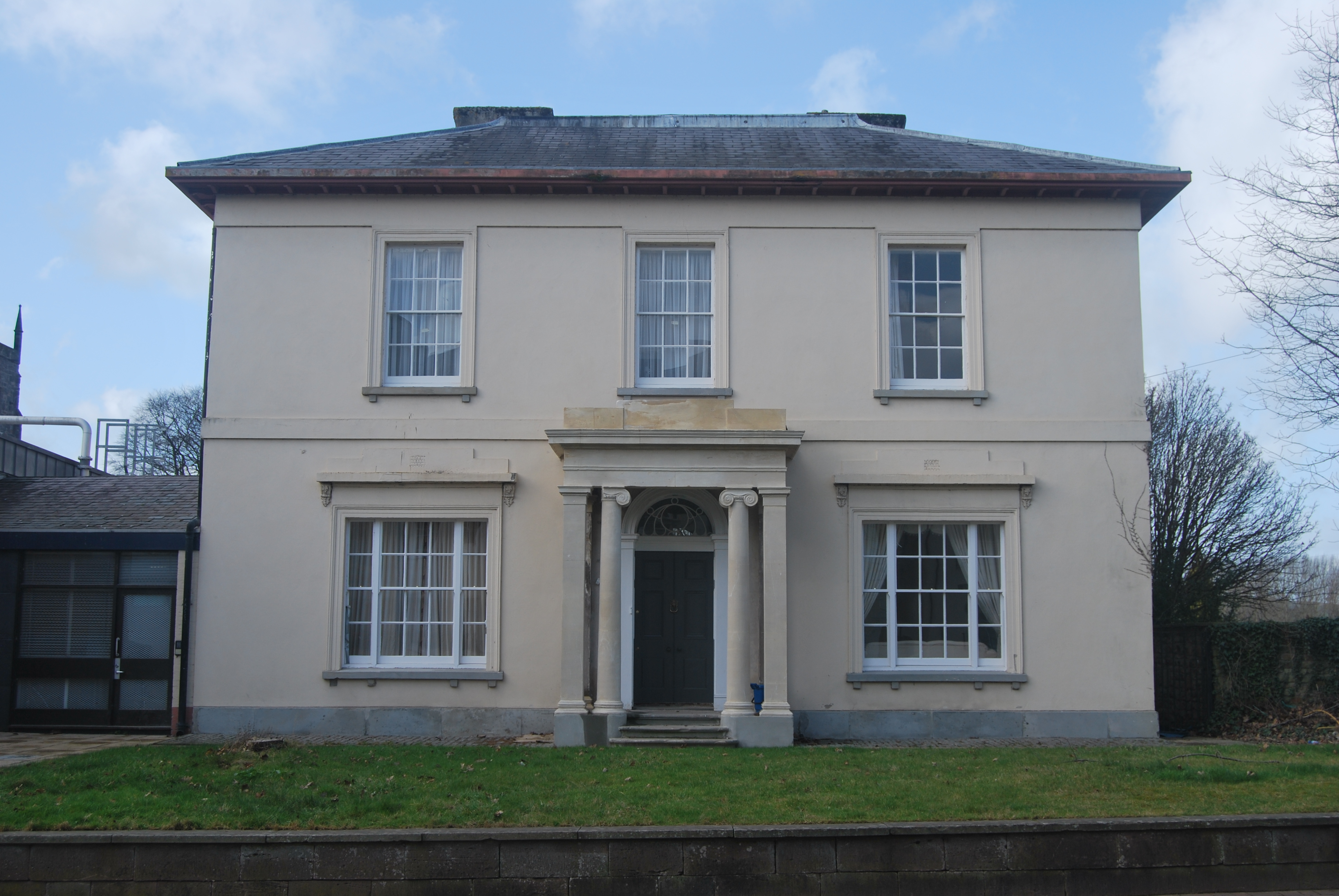
Oak House

== Sources ==
- Bly, Phil (2012). Guide to the complete Monmouth Heritage Blue Plaque Trail. Monmouth: Monmouth Civic Society. OCLC 797974800.
- Brodie, Antonia; Felstead, Alison; Franklin, Jonathan; Pinfield, Leslie; Oldfield, Jane (2001). Directory of British Architects: 1834-1914. Vol. 2: L-Z. New York and London: Continuum. ISBN 0-8264-4963-8.
- Colvin, Howard (1978). A Biographical Dictionary of British Architects: 1600-1840. London: John Murray. OCLC 1337285841.
- Herbert, N. M. (1988). "Hempsted". A History of the County of Gloucestershire. Victoria County History. Vol. 4: The City of Gloucester. London: Victoria County History. ISBN 978-0-197-22771-8.
- Kissack, Keith (1975). Monmouth: The Making of a County Town. Chichester: Phillimore. ISBN 978-0-850-33209-4. OCLC 255539468.
- Kissack, Keith (2003). Monmouth and its Buildings. Woonton Almeley: Logaston Press. ISBN 978-1-904-39601-7. OCLC 55143853.
- Nash, George (2015). An Anatomy of a Priory Church: The Archaeology, History and Conservation of St Mary's Priory Church, Abergavenny. Oxford: Archaeopress Publishing. ISBN 978-1-784-91108-9.
- Newman, John (2000). Gwent/Monmouthshire. The Buildings of Wales. London: Penguin. ISBN 978-0-300-09630-9.
