= Alexander Rolls =

- Born: 18 July 1818; Swansea, Glamorganshire, Wales
- Died: 22 April 1882 (aged 63); London, England
- Occupations: Mayor of Monmouth; Deputy Lieutenant for Monmouthshire; Justice of the Peace for Monmouthshire; Major Royal Monmouthshire (Light Infantry) Militia; Major 4th Royal Irish Dragoon Guards

Major Alexander Rolls (18 July 1818 – 22 April 1882) was a native of Swansea, Glamorganshire, Wales. A member of the renowned Rolls family of The Hendre at Llangattock-Vibon-Avel near Monmouth, Monmouthshire, his life in public service included four terms as Mayor of Monmouth. He was an officer in the Royal Monmouthshire (Light Infantry) Militia and the 4th Royal Irish Dragoon Guards. Rolls married twice; the widower's second marriage was to a divorcée, English actress Helen Barry.

== Family ==
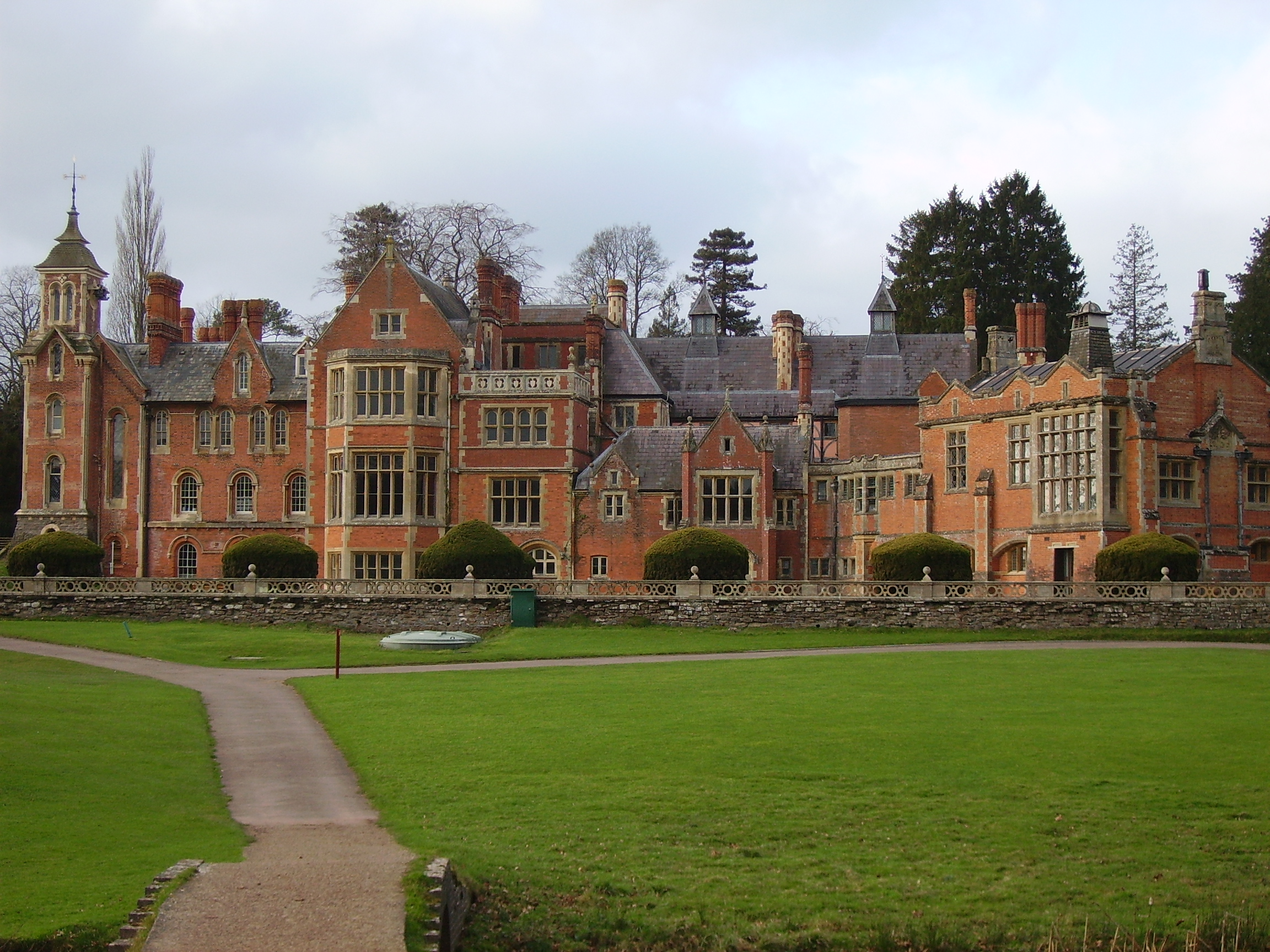
The Hendre at Llangattock-Vibon-Avel

Alexander Rolls, second son of John Rolls (20 October 1776 – 1837) and his wife Martha Maria Barnet Rolls, was born on 18 July 1818 in Swansea, Wales. He was one of five children. His siblings were John Etherington Welch Rolls, Martha Sarah Rolls Macready, Jessy Rolls Harcourt (d. 1842 Paris), and Louisa Elizabeth Rolls Vaughan (d. 1853). As a child, Alexander Rolls was educated at the Harrow School in Harrow, Middlesex, England. He left there in 1834 and attended the University of Göttingen in Göttingen, Germany.

Alexander's paternal grandmother Sarah Coysh Rolls had been the sole heir of the estates of the Coysh, Allen and James families. Included in her large inheritance was The Hendre which passed to her son John Rolls. Following the death of Alexander's father John Rolls in 1837, his older brother John E. W. Rolls inherited the family home at Llangattock-Vibon-Avel, near Monmouth. Alexander's father had undertaken the first of three expansions of The Hendre, which had originally been a hunting lodge. That first expansion was performed by architect George Vaughan Maddox in 1830. The second enlargement of The Hendre was under the direction of Alexander's brother John E W Rolls and was performed by architect Thomas Henry Wyatt. The third expansion was undertaken by Alexander's nephew John Allan Rolls, the future Lord Llangattock, in 1872, again using Wyatt as architect. The family home underwent its final enlargement in 1896 by architect Aston Webb, again under the direction of J. A. Rolls, then Lord Llangattock. The Hendre was Grade II* listed on 4 November 1985.

== Public service ==
Alexander Rolls spent a substantial portion of his life in public service. On 30 March 1838, Rolls purchased his commission as a junior officer, Cornet, in the regiment of the 4th Royal Irish Dragoon Guards. The following year, on 3 May 1839, he purchased his commission as Lieutenant in the 4th Dragoon Guards, and eventually reached the rank of Major. The London Gazette of 15 December 1848 reported that Alexander Rolls was a Captain in the Royal Monmouthshire Militia, his commission signed by the county's Lord Lieutenant. On 3 May 1853, he was commissioned as a Major in the Royal Monmouthshire (Light Infantry) Militia, by the Lord Lieutenant. He was also Justice of the Peace for Monmouthshire. Rolls became a Deputy Lieutenant for Monmouthshire on 24 July 1867, again receiving his commission from the Lord Lieutenant.

Major Alexander Rolls was elected Mayor of Monmouth in 1870, and in each of the next three consecutive years. In 1873, he donated a water pump to the town. The pump, which had a round trough at the base, stood in St James Square, previously an area of Whitecross Street. It was the former site of a weighing machine and, before that, a stone cross which had given Whitecross Street its name. The pump had the inscription, "This Pump was presented to the public by Alexander Rolls, of Croft-y-bwla, in the third year of his Mayoralty of this Borough, 1873. A merciful man is merciful to his beast."

== Marriage and later life ==
In 1839, Rolls married Kate Steward, third daughter of Ambrose Steward of Stoke Park, Ipswich, Suffolk. The couple resided in Monmouth in 1841. By 1861, Rolls and his wife had moved to Croft-Y-Bwla, a classical villa northwest of the town centre of Monmouth, positioned such that it had a view of the town. Croft-Y-Bwla had been designed by George Vaughan Maddox for Thomas Dyke about 1830. Dyke was a Grocer of Monmouth, and became mayor of the town in 1832, serving two more terms in 1838 and 1839. Croft-Y-Bwla was grade II listed on 15 August 1974. At the time of the 1871 Wales Census, Rolls and his wife were still living at Croft-Y-Bwla. However, he was widowed in 1876, his wife's death registered at Monmouth in the first quarter of the year.

The following year, Rolls married divorcée Helen Elizabeth Brandon, née Short. The English actress was twenty-two years his junior, and better known by her stage name, Helen Barry. The day before that marriage, however, Rolls appeared before officials of the Diocese of London. His address at that time was the Parish of Saint George, Hanover Square, Middlesex. Rolls signed an affidavit that his fiancée had married Joseph Brandon on 3 May 1855 (at age fifteen) at the Parish Church of Saint Luke, Charlton, Kent. He also acknowledged that, on 2 June 1870, the marriage had been dissolved at Westminster, upon the petition of Joseph Brandon, with the divorce finalised on 29 February 1876. The marriage between Rolls and Barry (as Helen Elizabeth Brandon) was registered in the third quarter of 1877, with the ceremony performed on 1 September at the Parish Church of St Mark at Regent's Park in Middlesex.

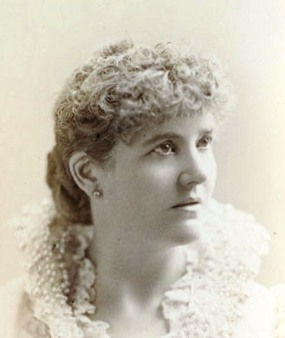
Actress Helen Barry, second wife of Alexander Rolls

Actress Helen Barry was born Elizabeth Short on 5 January 1840 in Lee, Kent, England, the daughter of Charles Henry Short and his wife Mary. Her daughter Esther E Brandon was born in Greenwich, Kent in the second quarter of 1855, around the time of Elizabeth's marriage to Joseph Brandon, a native of Belgium. Elizabeth began acting as Helen Barry in 1872, after her divorce, and after her daughter Esther had been put out as an apprentice. Helen Barry first appeared in Babil and Bijou at the Covent Garden Theatre. The actress also performed in The Happy Land at the Court Theatre, and Arkwright's Wife at the Leeds Theatre Royal and, following its move, London's Globe Theatre. She appeared in Heart's Delight in 1873–1874, and Led Astray at the Gaiety Theatre in 1874. After touring outside London, she returned to star in Around the World in Eighty Days and Heartsease, both at the Princess's Theatre, London. In 1876, Barry starred in L'Étrangère and, later, True Till Death. Helen Barry continued to perform in the theatre after her second marriage.

Less than two years after his marriage to Barry, the London Gazette of 11 April 1879 indicated that Alexander Rolls of 82 Regent's Park Road, Middlesex County, had declared bankruptcy. By 1881, he was lodging in the Parish of Saint George, Hanover Square, London, and his wife was not recorded at that address. Alexander Rolls died on 22 April 1882 in London. His widow moved to the United States following his death, where she appeared in theatrical performances in New York City. Less than one year after her second husband's death, Barry was married and widowed again. Helen Barry's third husband Harry George Bolam (1845–1883), a land agent and mining engineer, died at Westminster Flats in New York City from pneumonia on 23 March 1883, shortly after their marriage. The actress continued to perform in both New York and London. "Helen Rolls Bolam of New York" died on 20 July 1904 in Norwalk, Connecticut, USA. The date of probate was 24 April 1906.

== Family tree ==
Aaron Rolls (d. 1764)	Elizabeth
John Rolls (1735–1801)	Sarah Coysh (d. 1801)
John Rolls of The Hendre (1776–1837)	Martha Maria Barnet
Kate Steward	Alexander Rolls (1818–1882)	Helen Elizabeth Short Brandon stage name Helen Barry (1840–1904)
