= Croft-Y-Bwla =

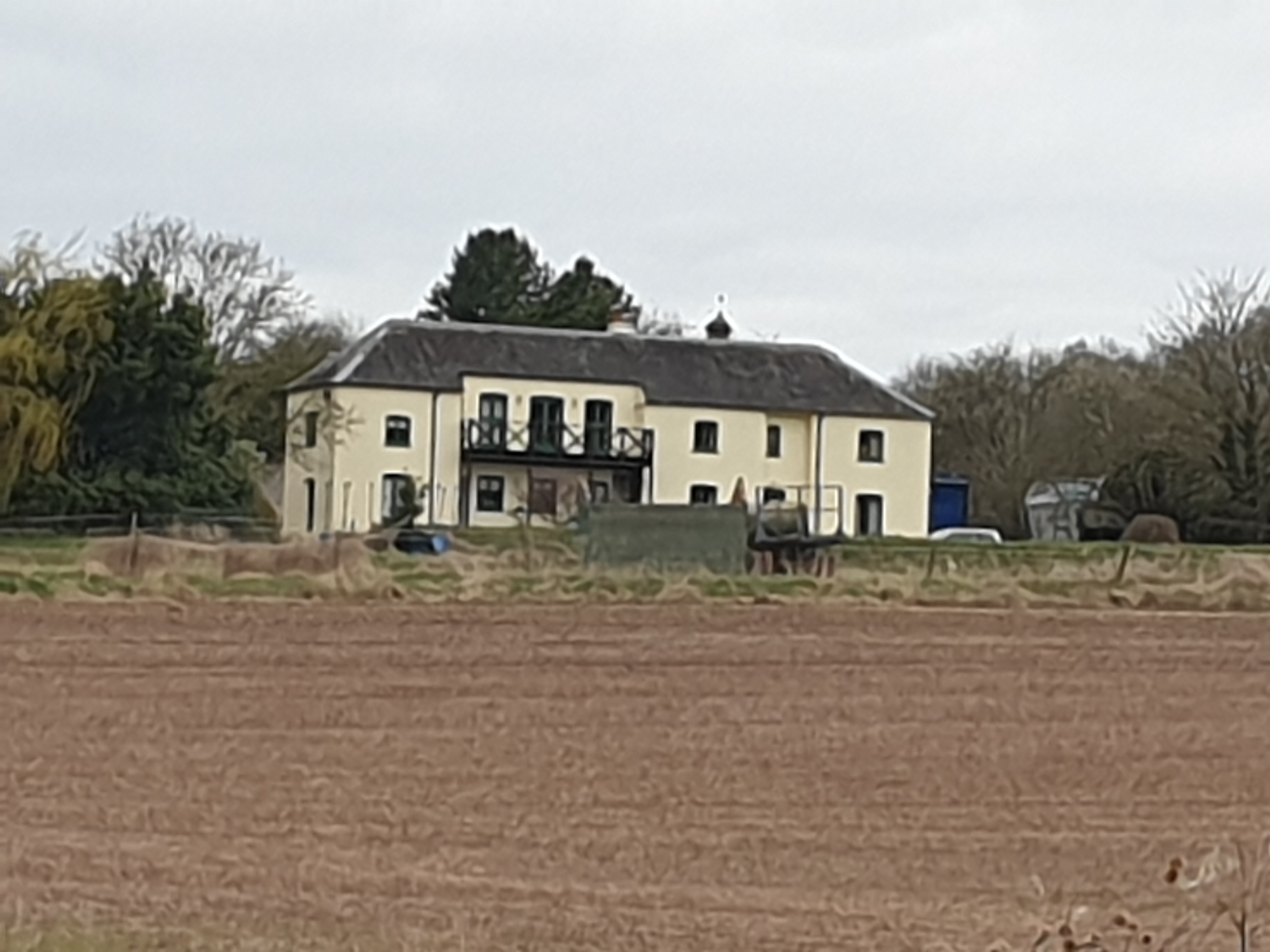
- Croft-Y-Bwla and grounds
- Interactive map of the Croft-Y-Bwla area

General information
- Location: Rockfield Road, Monmouth, Wales
- Coordinates: 51.818402°N 2.739675°W

Design and construction
- Architect: George Vaughan Maddox
- Designations: Grade II listed

Croft-Y-Bwla is a country house and farm 1.5 miles (2.4 km) north-west of Monmouth, south-east Wales. The house was built around 1830 and was designed by the noted Monmouth architect George Vaughan Maddox. It has been listed as Grade II since 1974.

Part of the estate is being developed for housing, under the name Parc Glyndwr. During archaeological investigations in advance of development, excavations revealed the remains of a Neolithic crannog built on a man-made island away from the shore of a now-vanished lake, as well as evidence of a Bronze Age boatbuilding community on the site.

== Etymology ==
The house name means "bull's croft". "Bwla" is a Welsh word borrowed from the English "bull" and it appears in written form for the first time in 1253: topyn felyn fwla. The native and older word for bull in Welsh is "tarw", which is much more common. "Bwla" also appears in placenames in Mid-Wales e.g. Carreg-y-Bwla, a working farm between Llangurig and Rhayader.

== History and architecture ==
Croft-Y-Bwla was built in about 1830 for Thomas Dyke, a Monmouth grocer, and was designed by G.V. Maddox. It is sited on a low spur of land with a distant view of the town. The two-storey house is of classical design, square in plan with three bays on each side. The walls are smoothly rendered. The entrance porch is of greenish stone from the Forest of Dean, with a pair of Doric columns. On the south-east side there is a verandah, described in 2000 as "exquisite" but "much decayed". The house also has stables dating from the mid-19th century, and a single-storey roadside lodge also believed to have been designed by Maddox. The estate includes a garden lodge, carriage drive, parkland, greenhouse and conservatory.

The actress Helen Barry once lived at the house with her husband Major Alexander Rolls (1818–1882), who was Mayor of Monmouth between 1870 and 1874 and the brother of John Etherington Welch Rolls. Col J.H. Walwyn (1850–1900), Mayor of Monmouth in 1896, and his son Capt Fulke Walwyn D.S.O. lived at the house for several years. Capt Fulke Walwyn was one of the first wounded to return to Monmouth in 1914 following the start of World War I. In 1932 it was occupied by the Sheriff of Monmouthshire, the shipping magnate and MP, Sir William Henry Seager.

== Development ==
A planning application to develop part of the area for housing was first submitted in 2004. Several later proposals were made, to develop up to 145 dwellings on the site. The proposal was subsequently promoted for development through Monmouthshire County Council's Local Development Plan, and a sustainability assessment of the site was undertaken. In 2011 planning permission was sought to develop the grounds into a golf course, driving range, hotel and conference centre.

Development of part of the site for housing is taking place in 2012, with the estate being called "Parc Glyndwr" by Charles Church Developments. It is promoted as "contemporary development, comprising a range of stylish 3 and 4 bedroom homes [which] offers well-proportioned living accommodation in a sought-after location."

=== Archaeological discoveries ===
Evidence of a Bronze Age boatbuilding community, including three 100 feet (30 m) long channels adjoining the site of a now-vanished lake, was discovered in September 2013, during archaeological investigations by the Monmouth Archaeological Society of the Parc Glyndwr housing development site, immediately north-west of the town.

The excavations later revealed the remains of a Neolithic crannog. The dwelling was constructed on stilts on a man-made island away from the lake shore in water up to 10 feet (3.0 m) deep. Oak timbers had been "skillfully" cut with stone or flint axes to form stilts, of posts and poles, which probably rested on three parallel fully-grown tree 'sleeper beams', up to 3 feet 3 inches (1 m) wide, laid horizontally on the lake bed. Timbers from the structure were radiocarbon dated to 4867 years before present (BP).
