= Oak House, Monmouth =

Building in Monmouth, Wales

Oak House
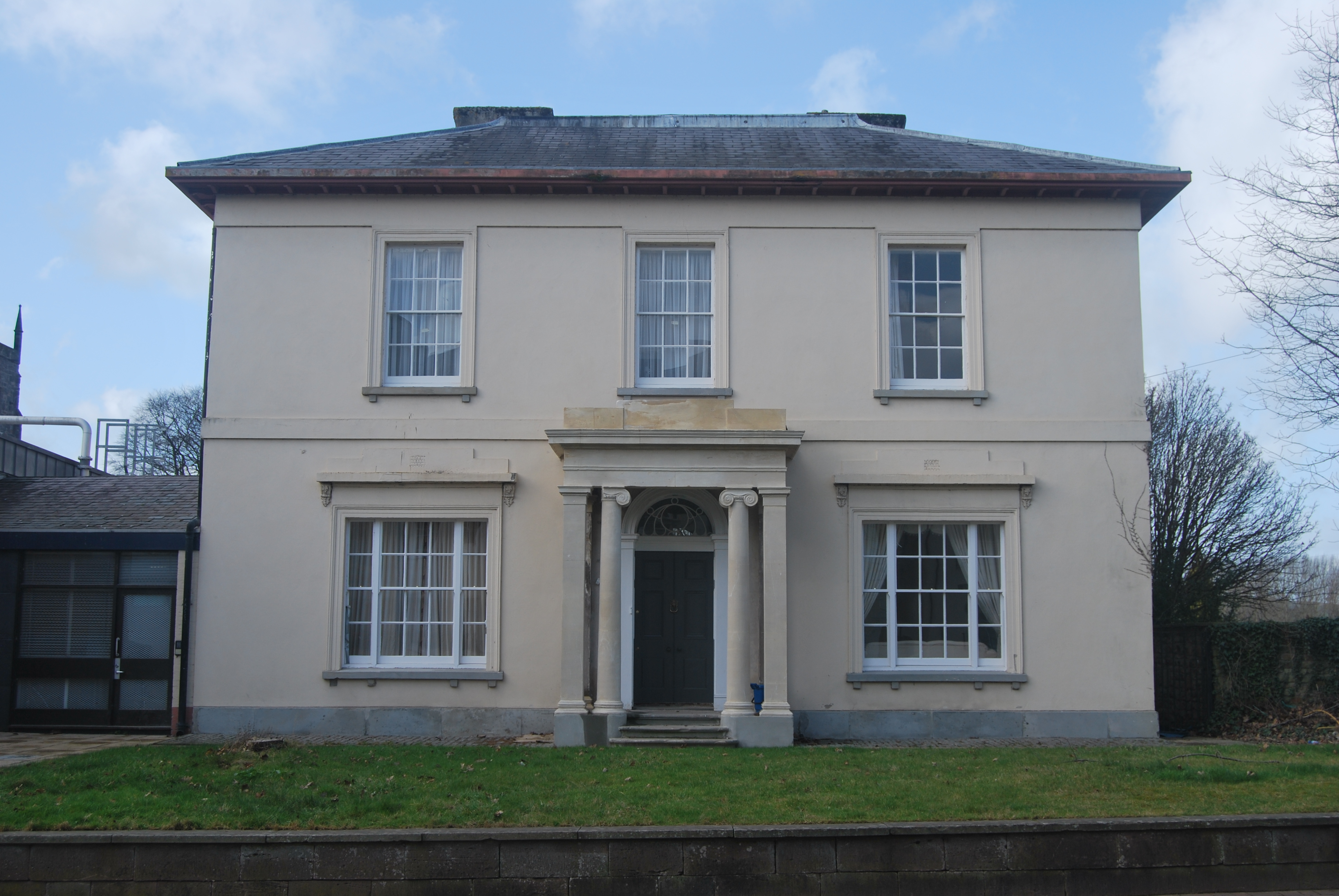
- Oak House, Monmouth
- Interactive map of the Oak House area

General information
- Location: 6 Monk Street, Monmouth, Wales
- Coordinates: 51°48′50″N 2°42′47″W
- Current tenants: British Telecom
- Completed: 1846

Design and construction
- Architect: George Vaughan Maddox
- Designations: Type II Listed Building, since 15 August 1974

Oak House is a Grade II Listed building on Monk Street Monmouth, Wales.

== History ==
The house was designed by George Vaughan Maddox and built in 1846.

The 1881 census records George Willis, a doctor and magistrate of the borough & county of Monmouth, as resident. He was born in Ireland in about 1829 and was still occupying the house in the 1891 census. He died on 15 September 1898. His obituary in The Morning Post newspaper said he had been Mayor of Monmouth three times and was a founder of the Cottage Hospital. Lloyd Grant Smith another medical practitioner was listed in the 1901 and 1911 Census as head of the household. He was born about 1860 in Birkenhead, Cheshire. Alice Smith was his wife and was born about 1868. The 1911 census information included the house had thirteen rooms (1911 Census excluding rooms: Scullery, Landing, Lobby, Closet Bathroom, Warehouse, Office and Shop).

The garden and house became home to Monmouth's Telephone Exchange established in 1902 following an intervention by J. A. Rolls which saw The Treasury provide a grant. Keith Kissack in his book Monmouth and its Buildings described a later extension to the telephone exchange as “dreadful”.

The house underwent renovation in the early 21st century. Pre-renovation investigations identified a resident colony of around 100 Pipistrelle bats.

== Gallery ==
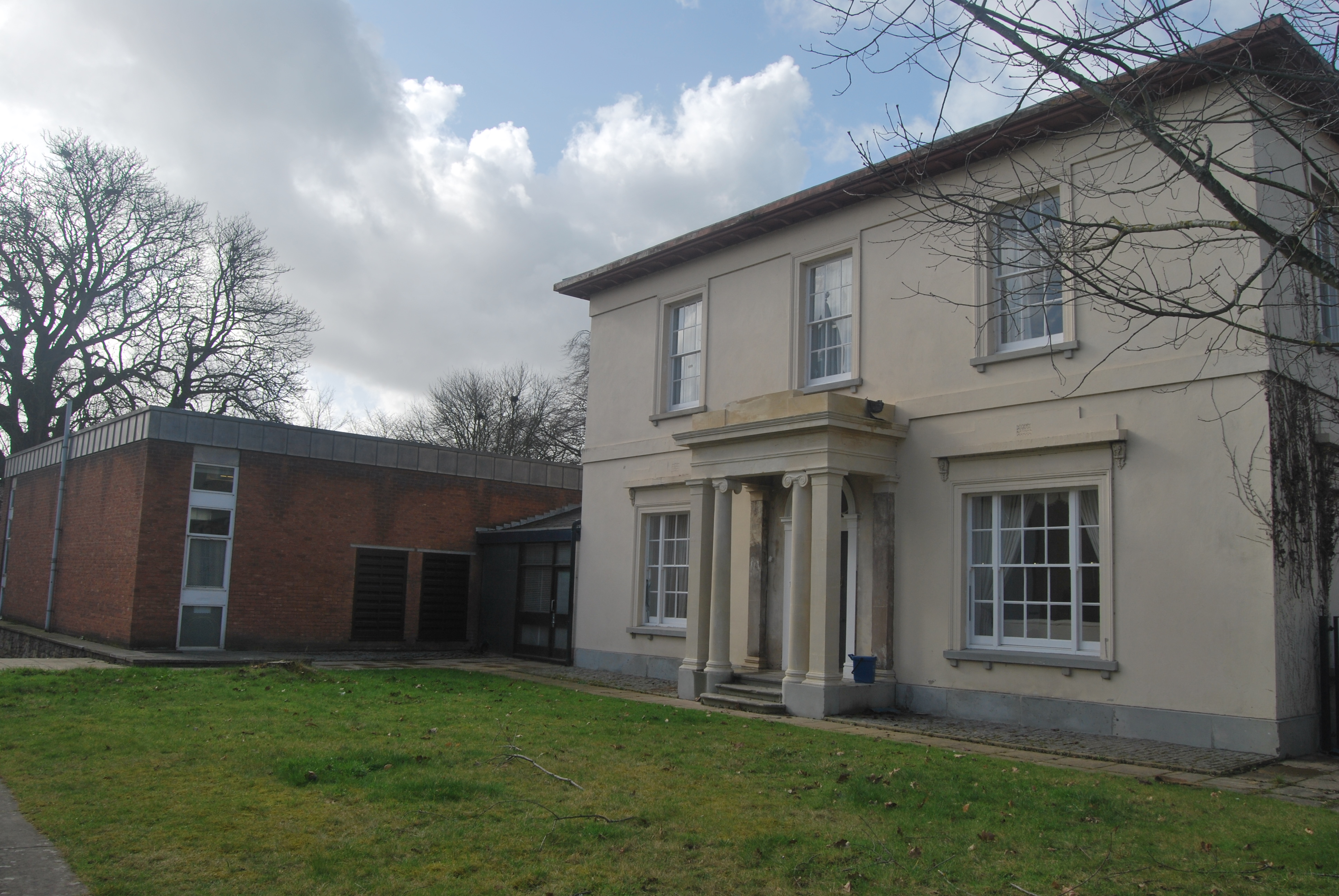
Monmouth Oak, House and the "dreadful" building that is the Telephone Exchange

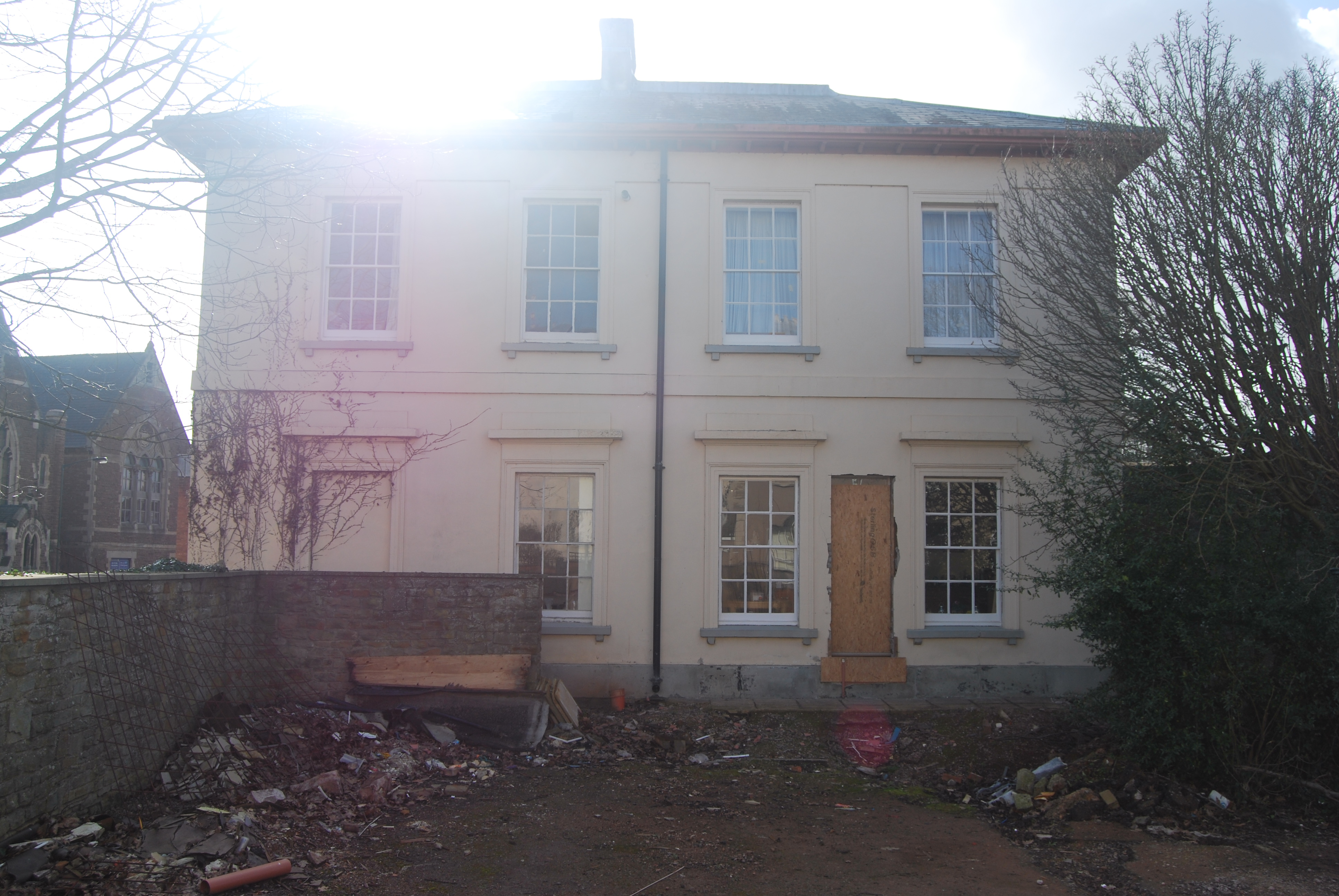
Oak House Monmouth - Right hand side

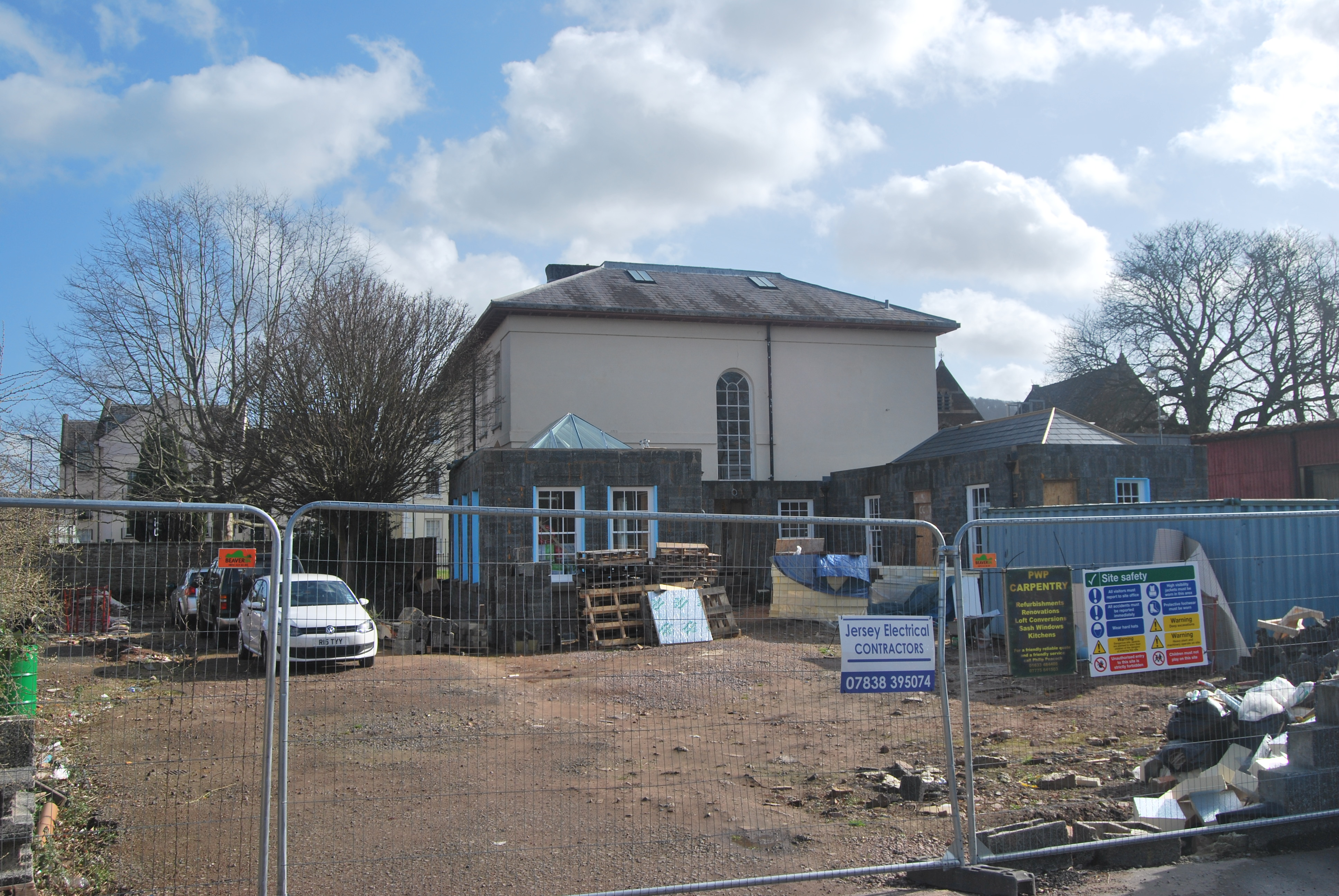
Oak House - Rear showing the building work to restore the building into a dwelling
