= Pentwyn, Rockfield =

House in Rockfield, Monmouthshire, Wales

Pentwyn
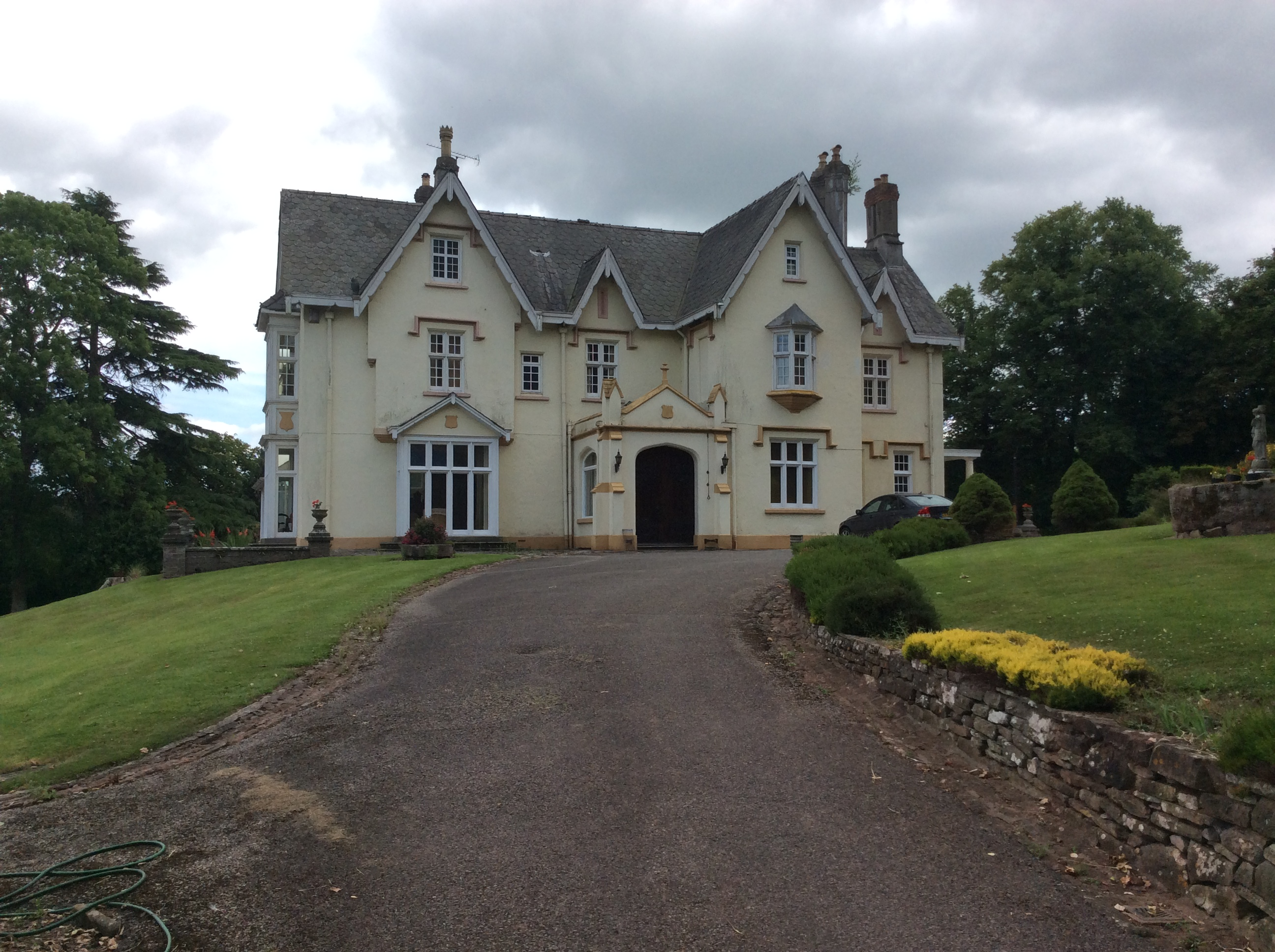
- "Much altered Tudoresque"

- Location within Monmouthshire
- 51.8306°N 2.7542°W
- Type: House
- Location: Rockfield, Monmouthshire

History
- Built: 1834–1837

Site notes
- Architect: George Vaughan Maddox
- Architectural style: Tudor Revival architecture
- Governing body: Privately owned

Listed Building – Grade II*
- Official name: Pentwyn
- Designated: 28 September 2006
- Reference no.: 87504

Pentwyn, Rockfield, Monmouthshire is a Victorian villa dating from the mid 19th century. Its origins are older but the present building was constructed by the Monmouth architect George Vaughan Maddox for himself in 1834–1837, and subsequently altered by him after a later sale. It was partly converted into apartments for letting in the 20th century before reverting to use as a family house. The house is Grade II* listed.

== History ==
The Monmouthshire historian Sir Joseph Bradney, in the Hundred of Skenfrith volume of his A History of Monmouthshire from the Coming of the Normans into Wales down to the Present Time, records that the property was originally owned by the Vaughan family of Llanrothal. In 1834, James Vaughan left the house to his nephew George Vaughan Maddox. Maddox, from a family of architects, had a significant practice in Monmouthshire and his works in Monmouth gave the county town, "its particular architectural flavour". Maddox certainly undertook works at Pentwyn on his own behalf, and Bradney suggests he designed further improvements after selling the property to the Reverend Canon John Harding in 1864. However, Maddox died in that year and Cadw considers that most of the improvements and extensions to the house predate the sale. In the 20th century, the villa was converted into apartments. It is currently for sale.

The gardens surrounding the house were mapped in the Ordnance Survey's Monmouthshire maps of the very early 20th century. These show scenic paths and a carriage drive, a kitchen garden, a conservatory and two areas of flat ground which were probably the sites for a tennis court and a croquet lawn.

== Architecture and description ==
The architectural historian John Newman describes the house as "Tudoresque" in style. Cadw prefers a description of Georgian Gothick. The house is of two storeys, with large attics above, and is rendered in stucco. The roofline has elaborate bargeboards and pinnacles. The interiors, which contain many original features, are similarly Gothick in design, with the exception of a large dining room dating from circa 1900 which Cadw describes as designed and decorated in an Edwardian taste. The building is Grade II* listed, on account of its architectural interest and its historic connections with George Vaughan Maddox.

== Sources ==
- Bradney, Joseph Alfred (1991) [1904]. The Hundred of Skenfrith. A History of Monmouthshire from the Coming of the Normans into Wales down to the Present Time. Vol. 1, Part 1. Chesterfield, Derbyshire: Academy Books. ISBN 978-1-873-36109-2. OCLC 59882270.
- Newman, John (2000). Gwent/Monmouthshire. The Buildings of Wales. London: Penguin Books. ISBN 978-0-140-71053-3.
