= Monmouth Methodist Church =

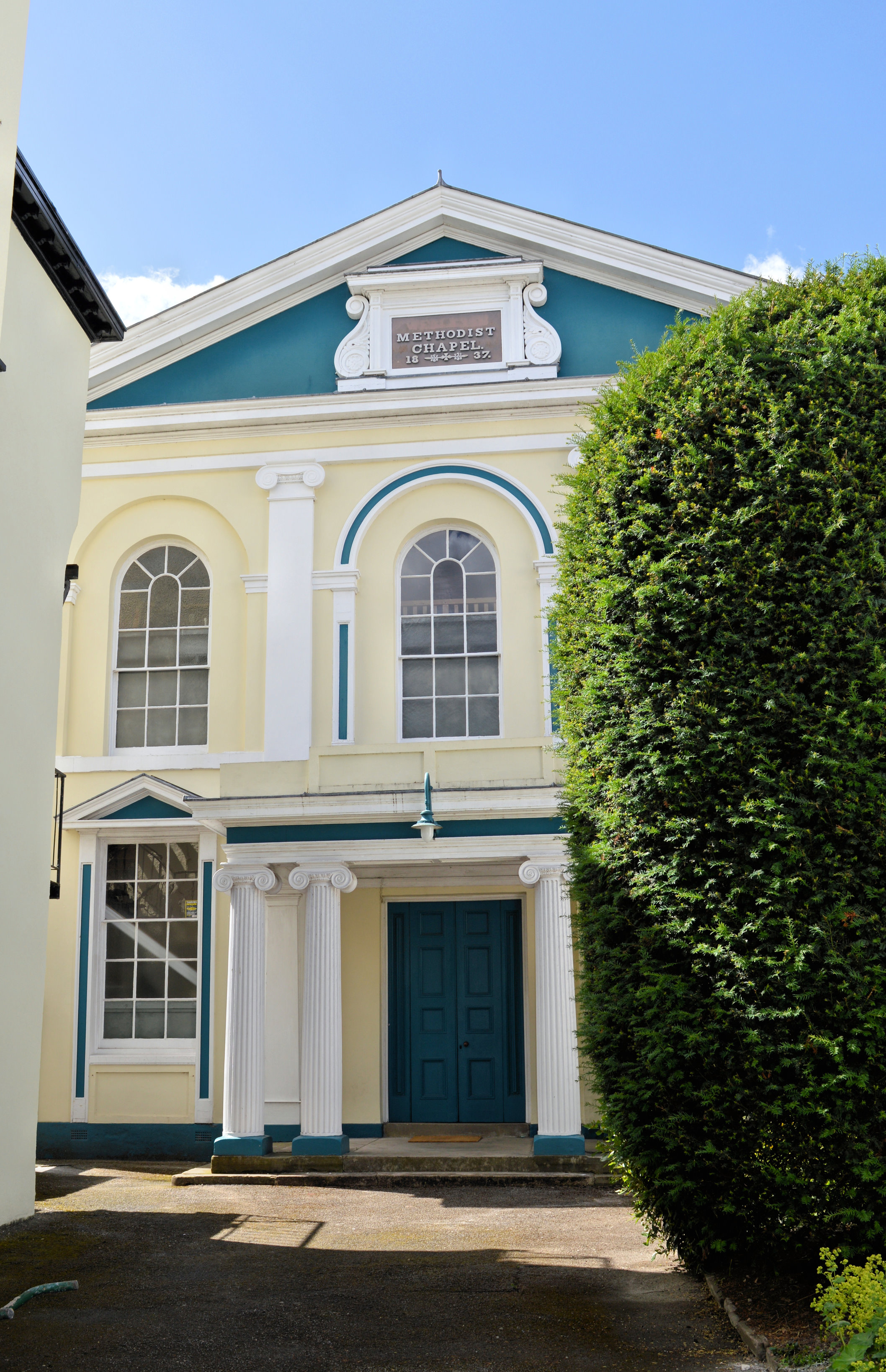
- Monmouth Methodist Church
- 51.8126°N 2.7117°W
- Location: St James Street, Monmouth, Monmouthshire NP25 3DL
- Country: Wales
- Denomination: Methodist
- Website: monmouthmethodist.org.uk

Architecture
- Heritage designation: Grade II* listed
- Architect: George Vaughan Maddox
- Style: neoclassical
- Years built: 1837

Monmouth Methodist Church is located in Monmouth, south east Wales. It is set well back from St James Street between buildings. Designed by George Vaughan Maddox and built in 1837, it retains its original galleries, organ loft and sophisticated pulpit.

In common with many non-conformist places of worship in the town built when town authority lay very much with the established church, it was deliberately set back behind the houses to avoid making too prominent a challenge to the established order. This is one of 24 buildings on the Monmouth Heritage Trail and is Grade II* listed.

== History ==
In the eighteenth century the new Methodists were challenging the presumption of the established churches in Monmouth. Visiting Methodist ministers were stoned and abused by unruly crowds who were encouraged by the churchwardens and gentlefolk. They were sometimes seriously injured – a preacher was killed by a blow in an open-air service near Hay-on-Wye in 1840. They persevered however and established their first chapel in Inch Lane, now called Bell Lane, a narrow alley off Church Street. John Wesley came to preach in the town, firstly in 1779, and four more times in later years, and a larger chapel was built in Weirhead Street as Wesleyan Methodism grew.

Finally, as this chapel proved too small, the present church was designed by George Vaughan Maddox, a local architect who had worked on The Hendre. The 340 seated church with its impressive façade was built in 1837. Maddox included Ionic pilasters with round-headed Georgian windows on the first floor but with triangular window heads on the ground floor, and a fine pediment over all. The church is enhanced by the later Ionic porch. The box pews allow 340 worshippers in sit in three sections below and in a gallery that follows three sides of the interior. The pulpit was much higher than it appears today; it was lowered in 1885 while the floor was raised by two feet. As a consequence, the internal columns bases are not visible as they are covered by the raised floor.

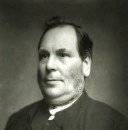
The Reverend Peter Mackenzie (1824–1895)

The Reverend Peter Mackenzie was employed as preacher and he drew a large following; he had a personal relationship with many Methodists, whilst his sermons were filled with "grotesque descriptions and extremely funny stories". Mackenzie arrived from Burnley, Lancashire, and lived at Coleford with his wife and two children using a donkey to travel around the circuit. A lady visitor, Mrs Bullock, commented whilst waiting for the minister to arrive for the service that she would buy an organ if ever the church was full. The minister arrived and immediately the church had reached its capacity. True to her word an organ was purchased and installed in celebration of this achievement. This church is considered to be one of the most architecturally distinguished Methodist chapels in South Wales with an interior that reflects its purpose and design. According to the local Pevsner architectural guide: "The interior, quite exceptionally for an early C19 chapel, is a coherent piece of considered architecture." The church as a whole is described as "a most satisfying work."

== The church today ==
The church has morning and evening services every week with a family service every month. The Monmouth church is part of the Newport and Lower Wye Circuit that includes other Methodist churches at Trellech, Broadoak, Llancloudy and Gwern-y-Saint.
