= Market Hall, Monmouth =

The Market Hall
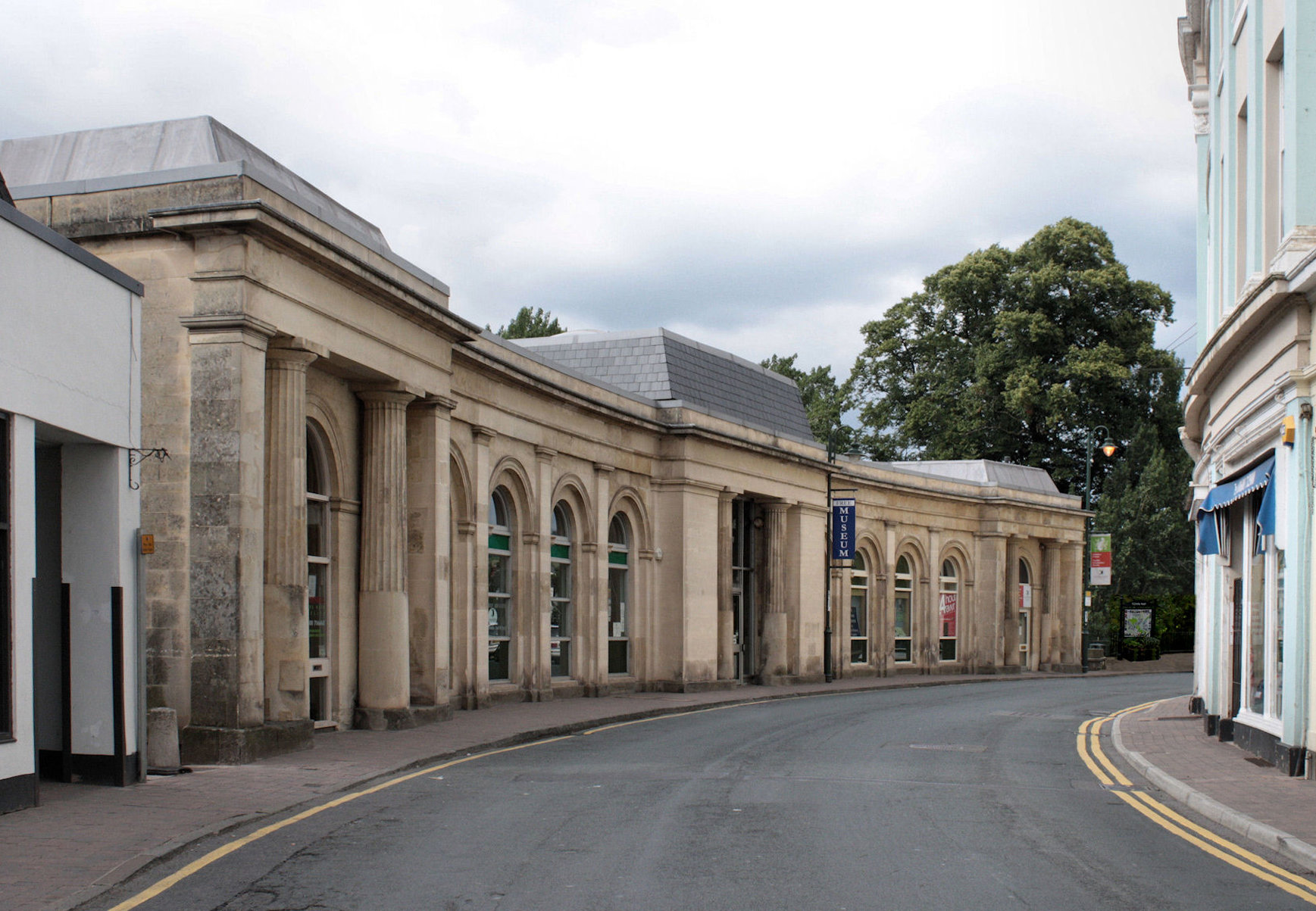
- The Market Hall, was the home of Monmouth Museum
- Interactive map of the The Market Hall area

General information
- Type: Market Hall
- Location: Priory Street, Monmouth, Wales
- Coordinates: 51.813028°N 2.715444°W
- Opened: 1840
- Renovated: 1968–69

Design and construction
- Architect: George Vaughan Maddox
- Designations: Grade II listed

Renovating team
- Architect: Donald Insall Associates

The Market Hall, in Priory Street, Monmouth, Wales, is an early Victorian building by the prolific Monmouth architect George Vaughan Maddox. It was constructed in the years 1837–39 as the centrepiece of a redevelopment of part of Monmouth town centre. After being severely damaged by fire in 1963, it was partly rebuilt and was the home of Monmouth Museum (formerly the Nelson Museum) from 1969 to 2021. At the rear of the building are original slaughterhouses, called The Shambles, opening onto the River Monnow. The building is Grade II listed as at 27 June 1952, and it is one of 24 buildings on the Monmouth Heritage Trail. The Shambles slaughterhouses are separately listed as Grade II*.

== Original building and associated development ==
By the 1830s, the main road into the centre of Monmouth from the north, Church Street, had become increasingly congested and insalubrious. The street was narrow, and was used by most of the town's butchers. According to local tradition, a local gingerbread maker, Mrs Syner, was closing the shutters of her shop on Church Street one evening when the mail coach to Liverpool went through at a gallop. Her apron strings were caught in one of the horses' harnesses, and she was dragged along the ground for some distance. Escaping serious injury, she grabbed the coachman's whip, knocked out some of his teeth with the handle, and marched back to her shop to begin organising a petition for a new road to be built to bypass Church Street. The Borough Council then organised a competition for the best scheme, with a prize of £10 for the winner. The scheme also needed to include a new Market Hall, as the traditional site of the town's produce market, beneath the arches of the Shire Hall, faced disruption because of the need to extend the accommodation for the Assizes.

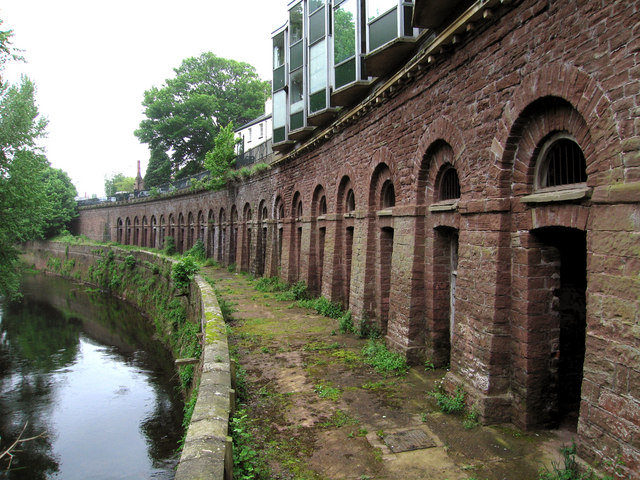
The arcade of slaughterhouses (or Shambles) beneath the Market Hall, above the River Monnow, with the modern museum extension above

The prize was won by local architect George Vaughan Maddox, who proposed a new road running to the west of the town centre, immediately above the bank of the River Monnow. Maddox's scheme was for a carriage road—now Priory Street—supported by a viaduct built upon the river bank. A new Market Hall was to be built on one side of the road, supported by the arches. The town's slaughterhouses or "shambles" would be sited beneath the arches, and the waste from them would drain directly into the river. Maddox is also believed to have been responsible for new buildings on the opposite side of Priory Street.

Work began on the new road in 1834. Construction of the New Market Hall started in 1837, and it opened in January 1840. Maddox designed a crescent-shaped frontage, in a "grandiose and scholarly Greek Doric" style, with an Ionic cupola and clerestory above the central part of the building, the whole being constructed of Bath Stone. The town's Post Office was located in the building from 1874 and, after 1876, the first floor of the building was used as the offices and printing works of the local newspaper, the Monmouthshire Beacon. The curved arcade of slaughterhouses beneath the Market Hall, facing onto the river, was built of Old Red Sandstone. The piers of the 24 arches were slightly inclined to give additional stability. The arches opened into deep storage rooms, vaulted in brick. The Market Hall has a Grade II listing while The Shambles below have an independent Grade II* listing.

== Fire and later uses ==
In March 1963, the entire central part of the Market Hall building was destroyed by a fire which started in the newspaper's paper store, on the first floor. The Borough Council, on the casting vote of Monmouth's mayor, decided that the building should be restored rather than demolished to provide space for car parking, although lack of funds meant that the upper storey and clock tower could not be replaced. A new flat roof for the single storey building, together with a Modernist metal and glass façade at the rear, overlooking the Monnow, were provided in 1968–69 by architects Donald Insall Associates.

Six years after the fire the restored Market Hall opened to house the Monmouth Museum and the post office. It was intended that the library would also move in but that remained at the Shire Hall. Apart from the museum and post office, the remaining parts of the building have at various times housed the county court, a labour exchange, Monmouthshire County Council offices, and a café. Following the COVID-19 pandemic in the United Kingdom, when the museum was shut, the council announced that the museum would not re-open on Priory Street and that the collection would be moved to new premises at the Shire Hall. The five-year project, supported by the National Lottery Heritage Fund, will see the new museum open by 2027. The Market Hall site will be let as commercial premises.

The slaughterhouses, which are visible from the railings behind the southern end of the Market Hall, remain physically intact but are disused, dilapidated, and increasingly vandalised. Many of the original slaughterhouse fittings remain in place. Various schemes have been put forward to re-use the slaughterhouses, without success. A feasibility project to investigate the site's potential was proposed by the County Council in 2009.
