= Charles Heath (Monmouth) =

British printer, writer and radical

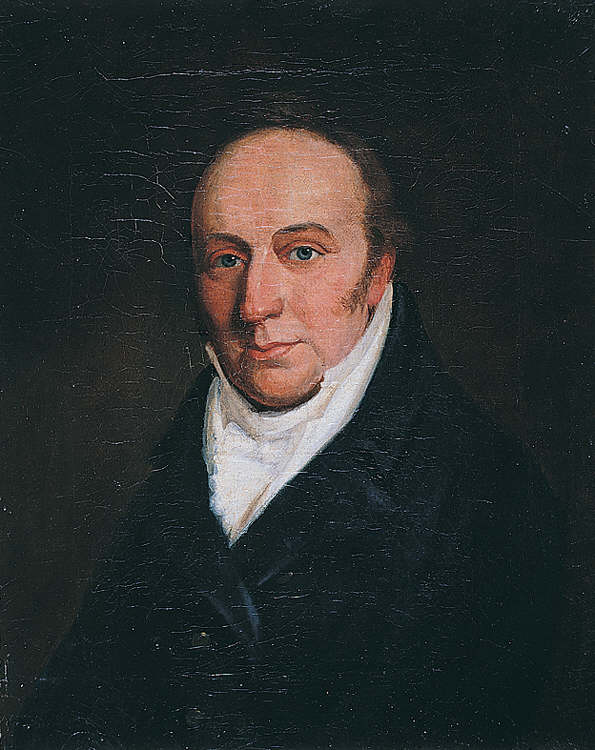
- Charles Heath (artist unknown)
- Born: 1761; Worcestershire, England
- Died: 1 January 1831 (aged 69–70)
- Known for: Radical, printer and historian

Charles Heath (1761 – 1 January 1831) was a printer and writer who became a leading radical in Monmouth. He was twice elected Mayor of Monmouth.

== Biography ==
Heath was born in 1761 in Hurcott, near Kidderminster in Worcestershire, to a family who owned paper mills in the area. He went to school in Hartlebury before training as a printer in Nottingham. He set out on his own in 1791, and established a printing business in the county town of Monmouth. This was the second printing press in Monmouthshire, following one set up in Pontypool in 1740.

Heath wrote and published a number of books on antiquarian subjects, and the topography and sights of the Wye Valley, which at the time was a popular location for tours by boat and carriage. He was an acquaintance of Romantic poet Samuel Taylor Coleridge, and in 1801 presented a copy of his Excursion down the Wye to Viscount Nelson and Emma Hamilton when they visited the town. All his topographical books went through several editions. His publications included:

- 1793: A Descriptive Account of Piercefield and Chepstow
- 1799: The Excursion down the Wye, from Ross to Monmouth: including ... memoirs and anecdotes of the life of John Kyrle...
- 1799: An Account of the Presentation of Colours to the Monmouth Volunteers....
- 1802: The Speeches of... Viscount Nelson of the Nile....
- 1804: Historical and descriptive accounts of the ancient and present state of the town of Monmouth: including a variety of particulars deserving the stranger's notice, relating to the borough and its neighbourhood
- 1806: Monmouthshire: Historical and descriptive accounts of the ancient and present state of Tintern Abbey....
- 1808: Monmouthshire: Historical and descriptive accounts of the ancient and present state of Ragland Castle...
- 1809: Descriptive account of the Kymin summer house: including the whole of the objects seen from the different windows....

Heath came to prominence in 1813 when he was amongst the leaders of a popular movement against the Dukes of Beaufort who controlled the town and the election for "Monmouth Boroughs". This constituency included not only Monmouth but also Newport and Usk. They had whittled the electorate down from over 2,000 a hundred years before to one of about 250 by 1813. At that election Henry Somerset, the Marquis of Worcester was elected and Heath was moved to action. The election of Henry Somerset was the third consecutive MP from the Somerset family. Heath, together with Hezekiah Swift, a local timber merchant, employed Henry Brougham as counsel and Herbert Harris as attorney and they challenged the result of the election.

He was elected Mayor of Monmouth of his adopted town in 1819 and 1821. The mayor who followed him in 1822 was his 1813 partner, Hezekiah Swift.

Heath died on New Year's Day in 1831 aged 69 although some report his death as 30 December 1830. A monument was not raised on his grave until 25 years later. A memorial stone stands outside St Mary's Priory Church. It is a Grade II listed structure.
