= Keith Kissack =

British schoolteacher & historian (1913–2010)

Keith Edward Kissack MBE
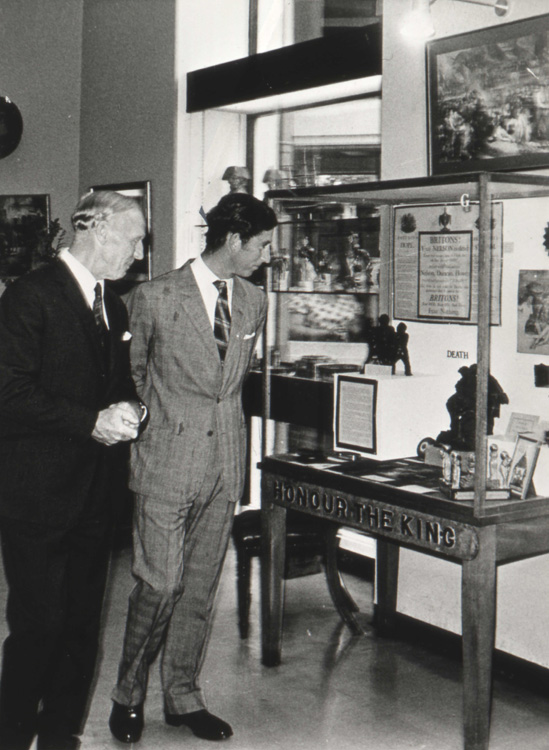
- Keith Kissack with Prince Charles in Monmouth Museum, 1975.
- Born: 18 November 1913; Clun, Shropshire, England
- Died: 31 March 2010 (aged 96)
- Education: Durham School
- Alma mater: St Mark and St John's College
- Occupations: Schoolteacher; Historian

Keith Edward Kissack MBE (18 November 1913 – 31 March 2010) was a British schoolteacher and historian. He wrote many books and articles on the history of the town of Monmouth, where he came to live, and on the county of Monmouthshire.

== Life ==
Kissack was born in Clun, Shropshire, to Rev. Bernard Kebble Kissack and Caroline Keith-Murray. His mother was a descendant of the Murray of Blackbarony family of Scotland, Edmund Murray Dodd, a leading figure in Nova Scotia in the mid 19th Century, and David Mathews, the Mayor of New York City under the British during the American Revolution.

Kissack attended Durham School where he was a member of the school cricket team in 1931 and 1932. He later attended St Mark and St John's College, Chelsea, where he trained as a teacher.

He married Audrey Winifred Jones, of Monmouth in 1939, and a daughter, Bethia, was born in 1940. He achieved the rank of captain in the Second World War, serving in North Africa, Sicily and Italy, where he was wounded.

After the Second World War, his second daughter Hermione was born in 1946. Kissack taught in Monmouth, becoming headmaster of Priory Street School. He served on Monmouth Town Council, and was a magistrate who chaired the local bench. He was also Curator of the Monmouth Museum, worked with the Royal Monmouthshire Royal Engineers to create their museum at Castle House, and a Fellow of the Society of Antiquaries. He was made MBE in 1976. In the Preface to the third volume of the Gwent County History, published the year before Kissack's death, the General Editor Ralph A. Griffiths described him as "the doyen among historians of Monmouth".

== Works ==
His major publications, excluding journal articles, included:

- The Trivial Round: Life in Monmouth, 1830-1840 (1955)
- The Inns and Friendly Societies of Monmouth (with E.T.Davies, 1963, revised 1981)
- The Formative Years: the rise of Monmouth under its Breton lords, 1075-1257 (1969)
- Mediaeval Monmouth (1974)
- Monmouth: the Making of a County Town (1975)
- The River Wye (1978)
- The River Severn (1982)
- Victorian Monmouth (1984)
- Monmouth and its Buildings (1991, revised 2003)
- Haberdashers Monmouth School for Girls (1992)
- Monmouth School and Monmouth, 1614-1995 (1995)
- The Lordship, Parish and Borough of Monmouth (1996)
- The Schools in the Priory (1999)
- Home Front Monmouth (2000)
- Monmouth during the First War (with Betty Williams, 2001)
- Monmouth Priory (with David Williams et al., 2001)

== Sources ==
- Griffiths, Ralph A. (2009). Gray, Madeleine; Morgan, Prys (eds.). The Making of Monmouthshire, c.1536–1780. The Gwent County History. Vol. 3. Cardiff: University of Wales Press. ISBN 978-0-7083-2198-0. OCLC 552064875.
