= Mayor of Monmouth =

- Coat of arms of Monmouth Town Council

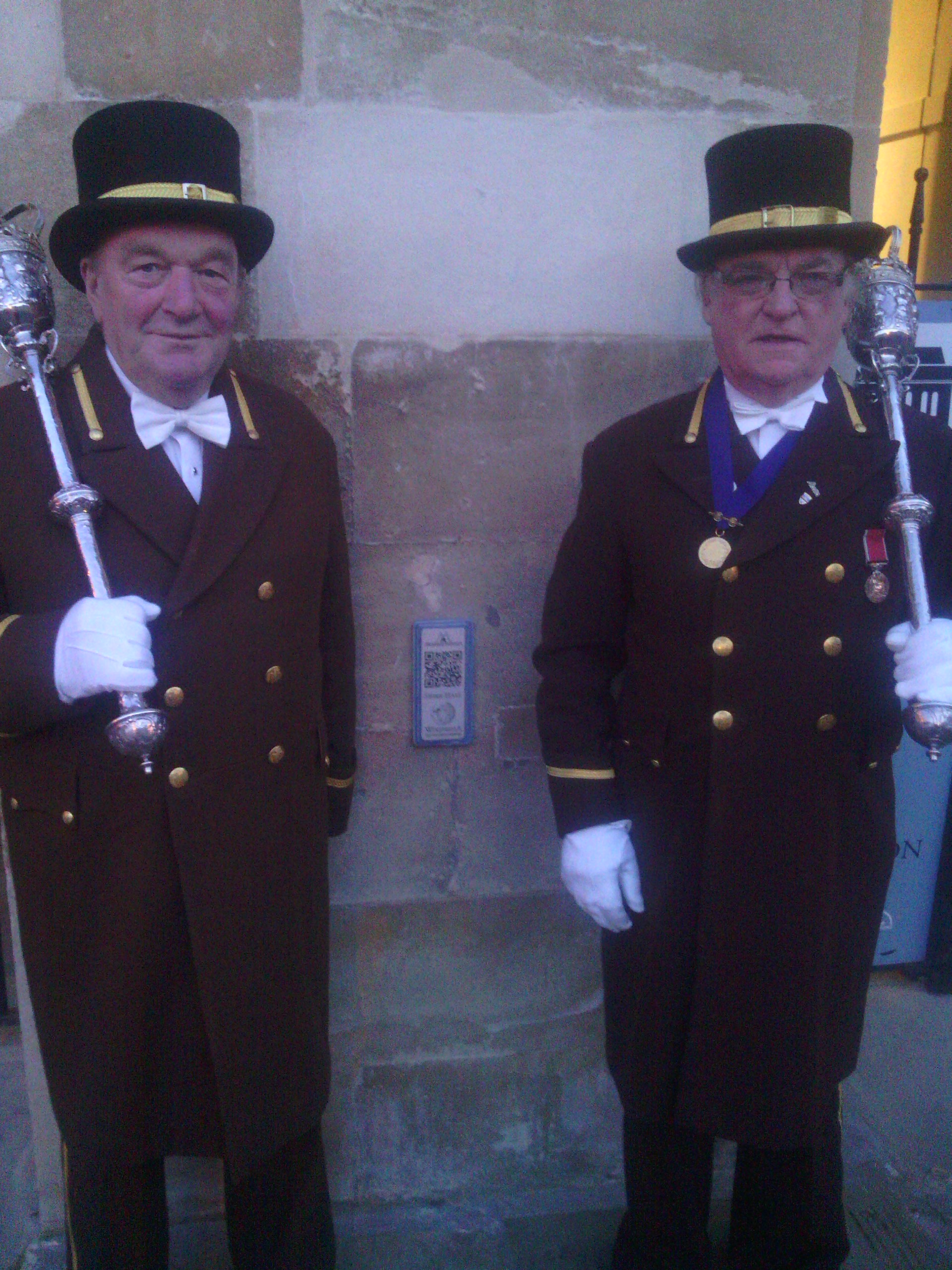
- Incumbent; Cllr. Rob Barrell since 18 May, 2026
- Appointer: Monmouth Town Council
- Term length: 1 year
- Deputy: Deputy Mayor of Monmouth
- Website: Mayoralty of Monmouth - Monmouth Town Council

The Mayor of Monmouth is an elected position given to a town councillor in Monmouth in Wales. The position dates back about 750 years.

== History ==
The position of Mayor in Monmouth was established in the 13th century by the people who were controlling the town's market. A seal was obtained from King Henry III confirming the rights and privileges of the position and the right to also establish bailiffs for the town. The position was confirmed in 1447, when Henry VI granted a charter to the town which permitted the town to raise taxes to pay for the town and also gave some freedom from the King's taxes (Henry VI's father, Henry V had been born in the town). This charter confirmed the position of mayor as an annual elected position and agreed that two maces should be carried before the elected person. These maces survive and carry the arms of the Duchy of Lancaster.

An elected mayor and bailiffs came to lead this body and by the middle of the 13th century a seal had been acquired from King Henry III with certain privileges. The office of mayor can be dated from this time.

The historian and cartographer, John Speed mentions the position again in 1611 when he itemises the authorities as a mayor, two bailiffs and fifteen councillors. This list is still true in 2012.

In 1813, there was a court case concerning the influence of the Duke of Beaufort in the appointment of Mayors of Monmouth. The case was won by a team including local historian, Charles Heath but the Duke found other ways of gaming the system. Heath eventually became Mayor in 1819 and 1821.

In 1835 the Municipal Corporations Act adjusted the powers but identified 1666 as the defining date of Monmouth's last charter.

William Sambrook, who was a local chemist and a keen supporter of Monmouth Baptist Church, was elected Mayor of Monmouth nine times.

== List of mayors (incomplete) ==
- 1675 – Richard Ballard
- 1744 – William Williams
- 1785 – William Cecel
- 1786 – Luke Phillips
- 1787 – Thomas Morrison?
- 1806 – Thomas Prosser
- 1819 – Charles Heath
- 1820 – Rev. Thomas Prosser
- 1821 – Charles Heath
- 1822 – Hezekiah Swift
- 1836 – Thomas Watkins
- 1837 – Thomas Watkins
- 1838 – Thomas Prosser
- 1839 – Thomas Prosser
- 1839 – Thomas Dyke
- 1840 – John Leach Nicholas
- 1841 – John Leach Nicholas
- 1842 – George Willis
- 1843 – George Willis
- 1844 – James Pearce King
- 1845 – James Pearce King
- 1852 – John Mayou
- 1860 – John Leach Nicholas
- 1861 – John Leach Nicholas
- 1862 – George Willis M.D.
- 1863 – George Willis M.D.
- 1864 – James Pearce King
- 1865 – James Pearce King
- 1870 – Alexander Rolls
- 1871 – Alexander Rolls
- 1872 – Alexander Rolls
- 1873 – Alexander Rolls
- 1874 – Thomas Jones Baker
- 1875 – Thomas Richard Hyam
- 1876 – Thomas Richard Hyam
- 1877 – Joseph Coates
- 1879 – Arthur Vizard
- 1880 – G.P. Tippins
- 1883 – Champney Powell
- 1884 – Champney Powell
- 1885 – Champney Powell
- 1889 – William Hall
- 1891 – William Honeyfield, 1891–96
- 1896 – John Rolls, 1st Baron Llangattock
- 1896 – Col J.H. Walwyn
- 1898 – Col J.H. Walwyn
- 1899-1900 – James Howse
- 1900-01 – Hamilton Traherne Baillie
- 1901-02 – Hamilton Traherne Baillie (second term)
- 1902-03 – Hamilton Traherne Baillie (third term)
- 1903 - G. R. Edwards
- 1904 - G. R. Edwards
- 1906 – Major John Rolls, 2nd Baron Llangattock
- 1907 – Major John Rolls, 2nd Baron Llangattock
- 1908 – W Sambrook
- 1909 – W Sambrook
- 1914 - W Bunting
- 1910 – W Sambrook
- 1921 – A.T. Blake
- 1934 – Charles James Jones
- 1950 – Bernard Partridge
- 1951 – Bernard Partridge
- 1952 – Bernard Partridge
- 1953 – Bernard Partridge
- 1954 – Stanley Howard Bowen
- 1955 – Stanley Howard Bowen
- 1956 – James Benjamin Breakwell
- 1957 – James Benjamin Breakwell
- 1958 – Richard Pryce Burnet Thomas
- 1959 – Richard Pryce Burnet Thomas
- 2009 – Terry Christopher
- 2010 – Ann Were
- 2011 – Jeana Hall
- 2012 – Gerry Bright
- 2013 – Jeana Hall
- 2014 – Jane Gunter
- 2015 – Graham Pritchard
- 2016 - Terry Christopher
- 2017 - Felicity Cotton
- 2018 - Terry Christopher
- 2019 - Richard Roden
- 2020 - Mat Feakins
- 2021 - Terry Christopher
- 2022 - Alice Fletcher
- 2023 - Tom Kirton
- 2024 - David Evans
- 2025 - Jackie Atkin
- 2026 - Rob Barrell

== Gallery ==
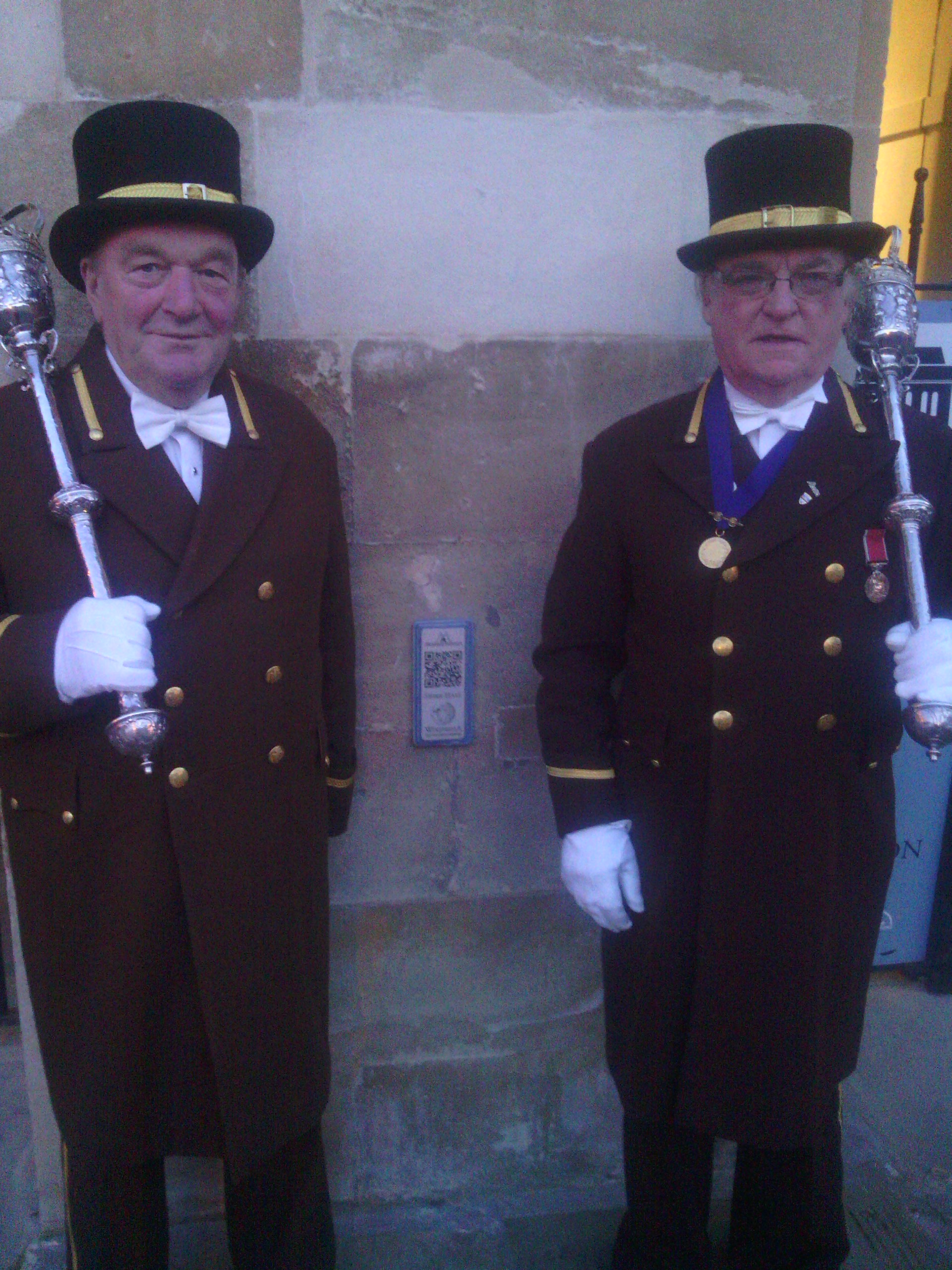
The two bailiffs or mace men were mentioned in 1447

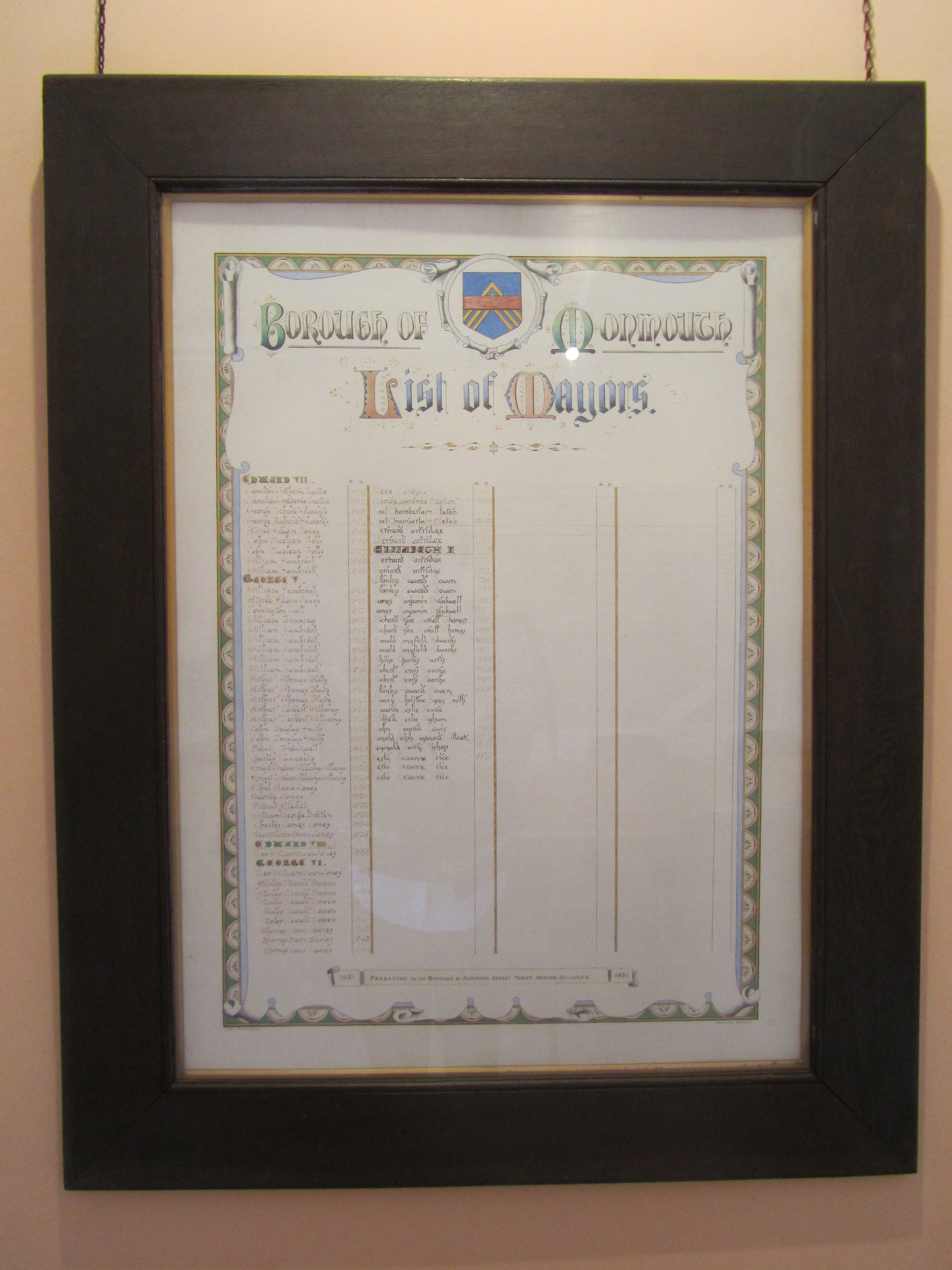
Borough of Monmouth, list of mayors, on display at the Shire Hall, Monmouth

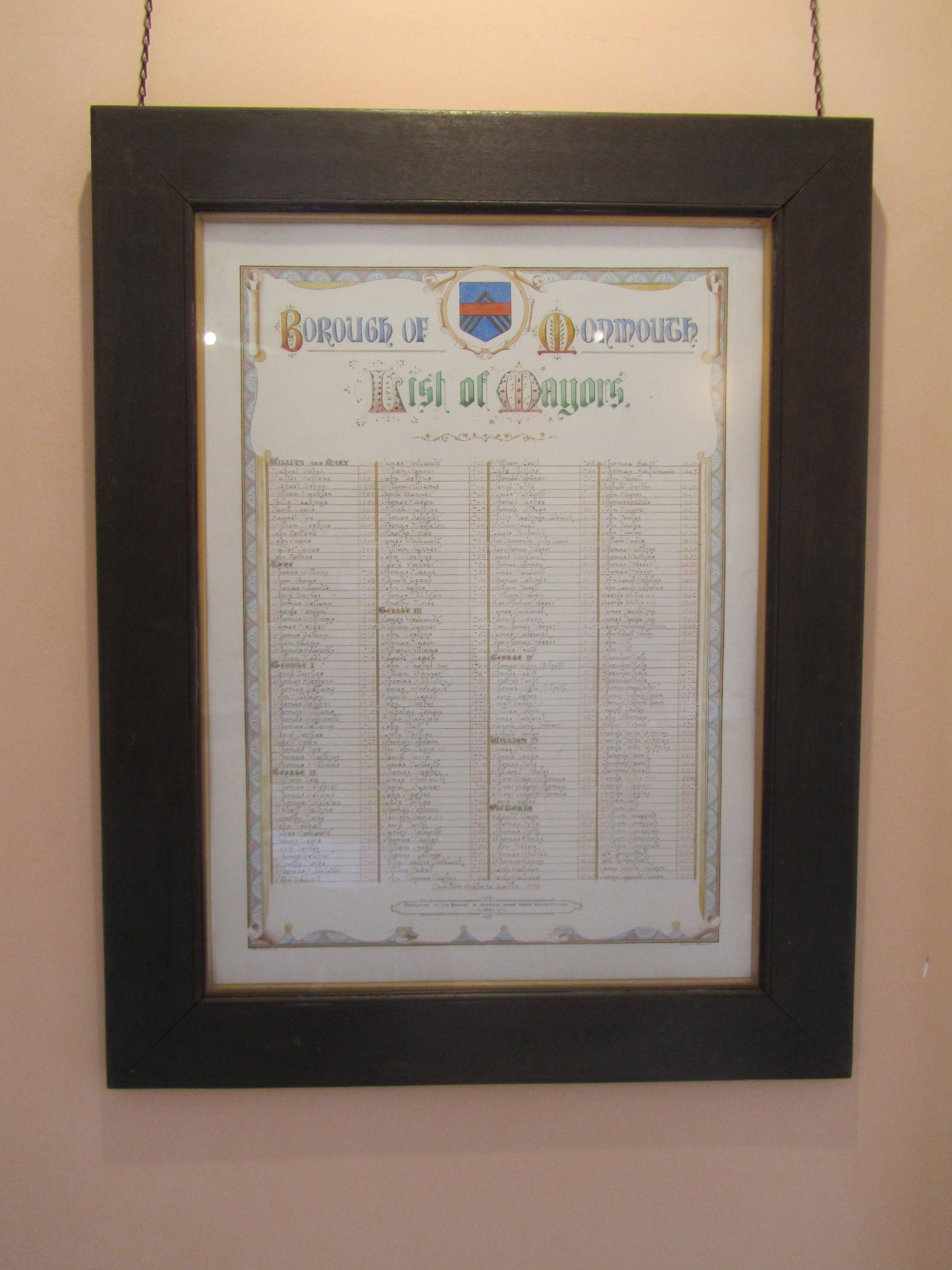
Borough of Monmouth, list of mayors, on display at the Shire Hall, Monmouth
