= Vauxhall Fields, Monmouth =

Park in Monmouth, Wales

Vauxhall Fields
- Vauxhall Meadows
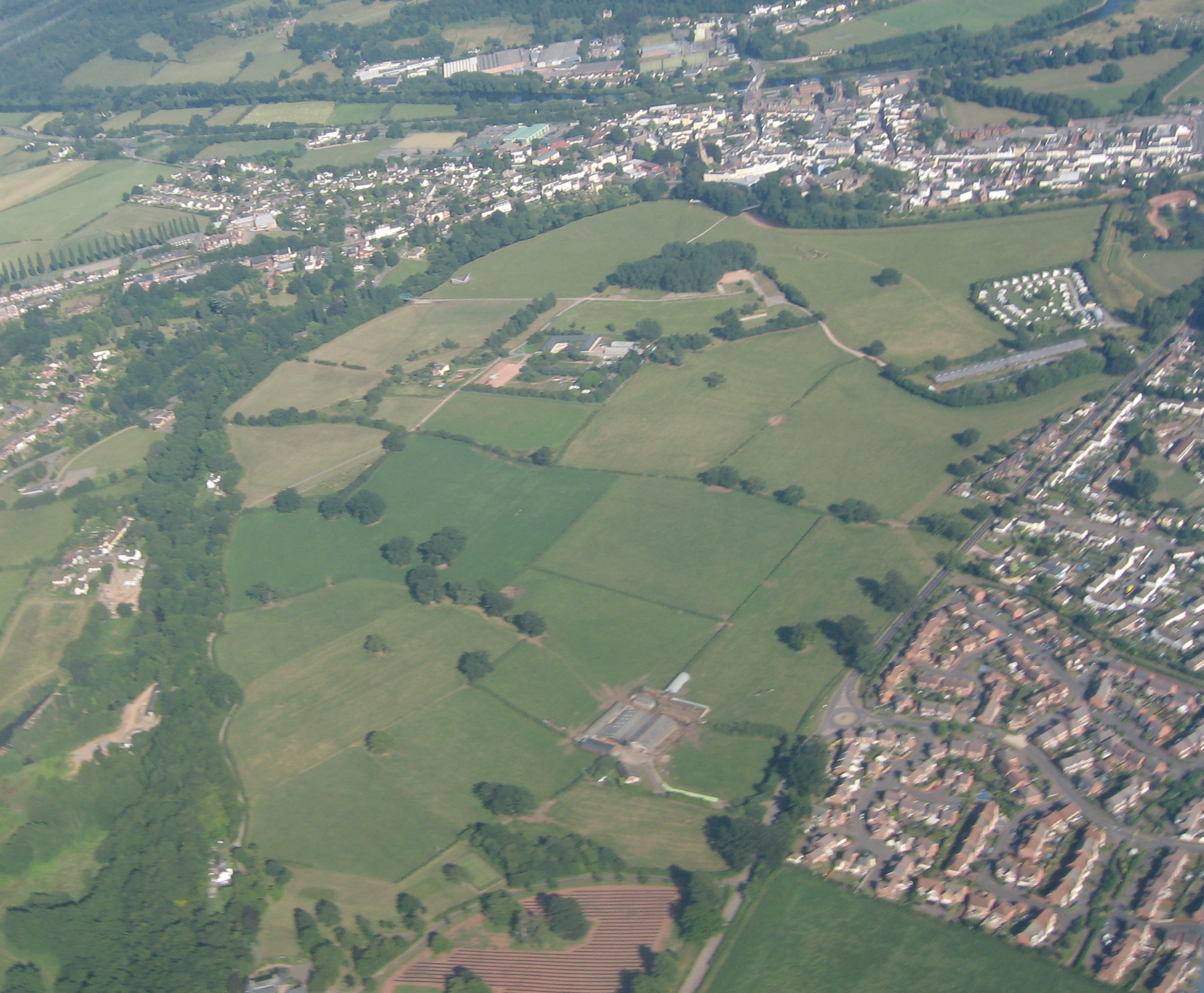
- Aerial photo of Vauxhall Fields from the northwest, looking southeast
- Interactive map of Vauxhall Fields
- Location: Monmouth, Wales
- Coordinates: 51.815°N 2.722°W

Vauxhall Fields, also known as Vauxhall Meadows, are water meadows to the northwest of Monmouth town centre, Wales. The River Monnow borders the meadows on two sides. The meadows have generally remained free of development. The area has been prone to flooding on many occasions over the years.

== History ==
Before 1880 the area was mainly farmland. The area was originally made up of several fields:- Castle Field Meadows, Lower Priory Holme, Middle Priory Field, and Bridge Meadows. Castle Field was probably the main site of the battle in 1233 between the supporters of Henry III, King of England, and those of Richard, the Earl of Pembroke and Lord Marshal. In the late eighteenth century, part of the area was laid out as pleasure grounds by Mr. Tibbs, landlord of the Beaufort Arms Hotel, and became known as Vauxhall after Vauxhall Gardens in London.

Vauxhall Farmhouse is a Grade II Listed building and has been since 8 October 2005. It is located about 500 m north of Monmouth Castle looking south across Vauxhall Meadows. The Vauxhall Fields area was used by Monmouth Show from 1946 until 2006, although the show was not held in 1956 or 2001 due to outbreaks of foot-and-mouth disease. The fields were also used by Haberdashers' Monmouth School for Girls as playing fields until the school bought its own land and built playing fields close to the school in the 1980s.

More recently the fields have been used for the Wales International Kite Festival, steam rallies, Scout jamborees, dog shows, show jumping competitions, guided walks, fun runs and hot air balloon flights.

== Horse racing ==
As early as 1734 horse racing was taking place in Monmouth. The early years of horse racing in Monmouth took place at Chippenham Park. It is not clear when the racing moved to Vauxhall Fields but by 1902 Monmouth Races put Monmouth at the Centre of National hunt racing. The fields were in use up until the races ended 1933. This ending almost 200 years of racing history in Monmouth. The racecourse layout is clearly marked on Ordnance Survey maps of Monmouth from 1900 to 1930 which also show the position of the Grandstand. Monmouth Museum has only one photograph of Monmouth races in progress taken c. 1925.

== Vauxhall Camp ==
The Royal Monmouthshire Royal Engineers (Militia) (R MON RE(M)) have a camp on Vauxhall Fields. The Royal Engineers constructed a bridge which was known as White Bridge in 1905. It was constructed by No.2 Company of the Monmouthshire Regiment and spanned the River Monnow until its replacement in 1931 with an Inglis Bridge, which still stands. The bridge is the only known example of an Inglis bridge still in public use in Britain. The Army announced that it intended to prohibit vehicles on the bridge from October 2011. The Royal Monmouthshire Royal Engineers have used the field for medal-awarding ceremonies.

== Air Field ==
On 25 August 1912 a small biplane aircraft became the first aeroplane to land in Monmouth when it landed on Vauxhall Fields. The plane was flown from Lark Hill on Salisbury Plain, via Weymouth and was flown by Lieutenant Fox. The plane eventually left with just the pilot on board due to the boggy ground unable to take more weight. The reason for the event is unknown.

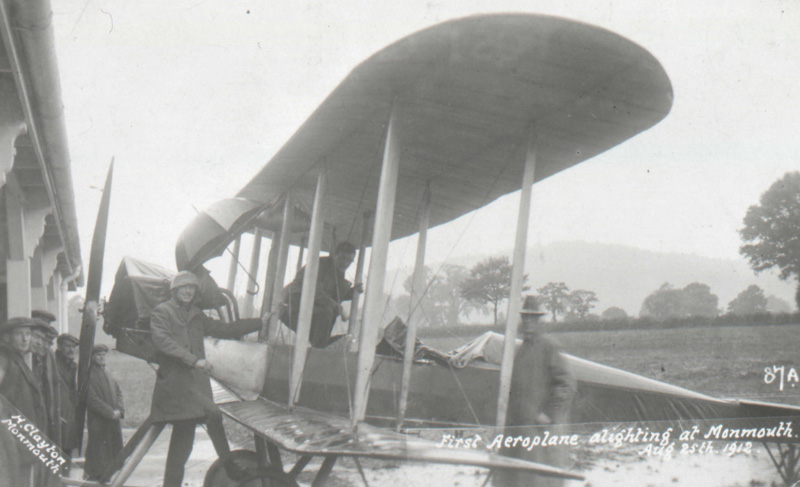
Royal Aircraft Factory BE2 Aeroplane. First aeroplane to land in monmouth

== Golf ==
A golf club called Vauxhall Golf Club was formed in 1892 by members of the army personnel stationed in the town. The majority of its members were army personnel. Vauxhall Golf club was eventually taken over by Monmouth Golf Club who used Vauxhall fields until 1903 when the club moved to the Hendre Estate as the Vauxhall fields were deemed unsuitable.

== Housebuilding ==
In 2011 housebuilder Taylor Wimpey put forward a proposal to build 300 houses on and around the Fields as an alternative to a site identified in the draft local development plan. The proposal was criticised for seeking to build on open countryside outside defined settlement boundaries.

== Gallery ==
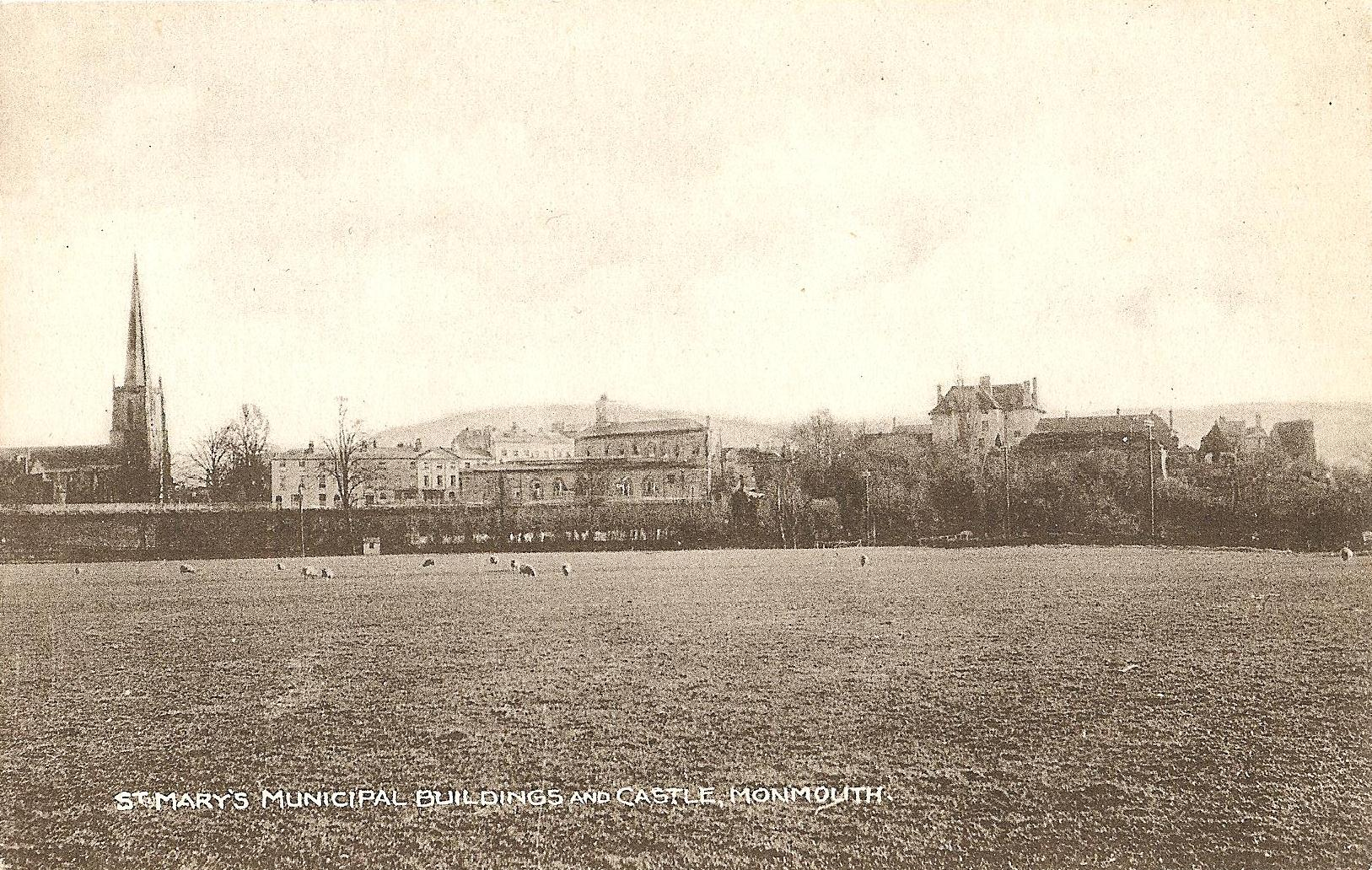
Monmouth Vauxhall Fields Looking at the Town 1930's

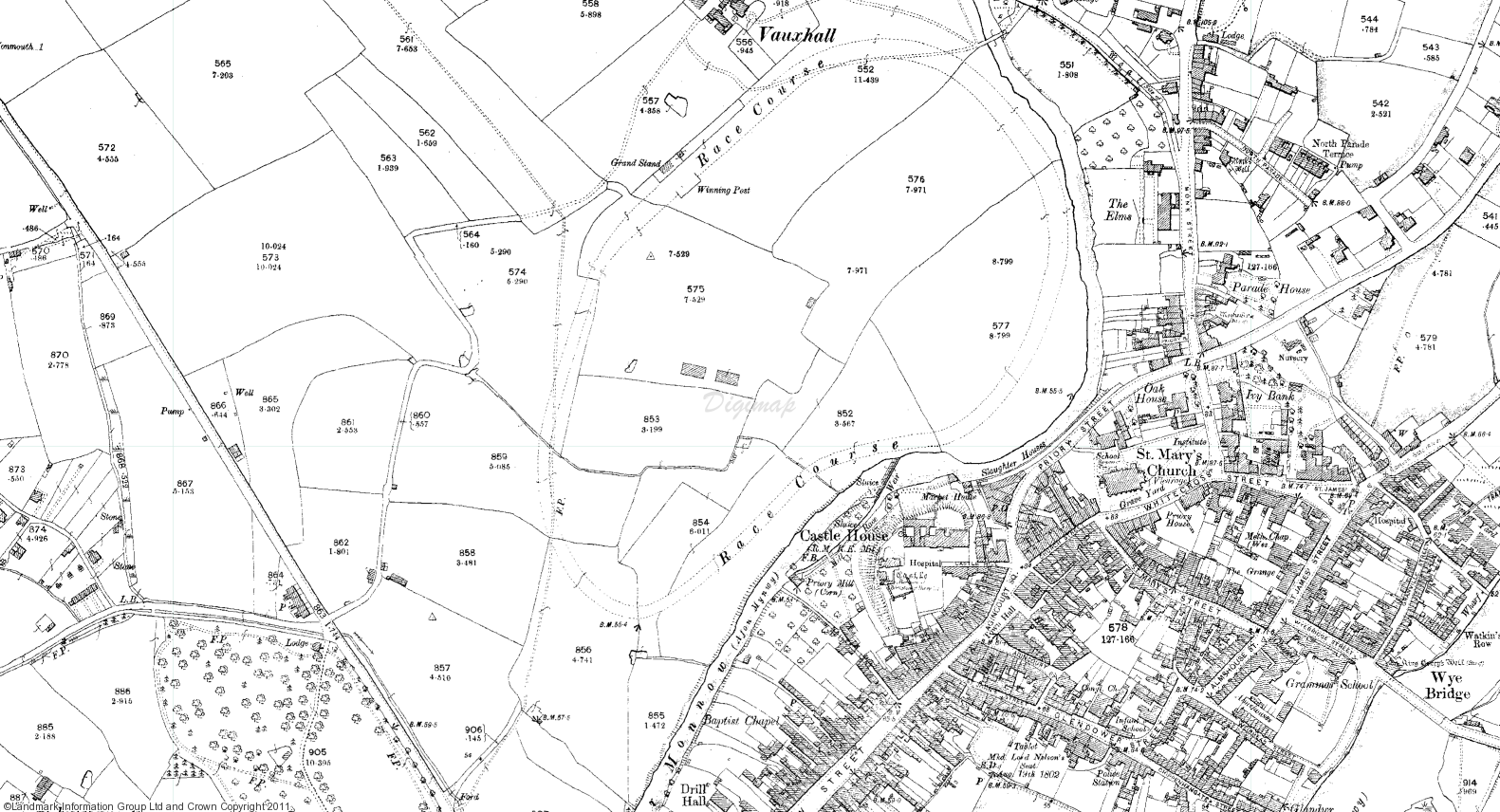
OS Map 1900 Showing Vauxhall Fields Horse Racing Course

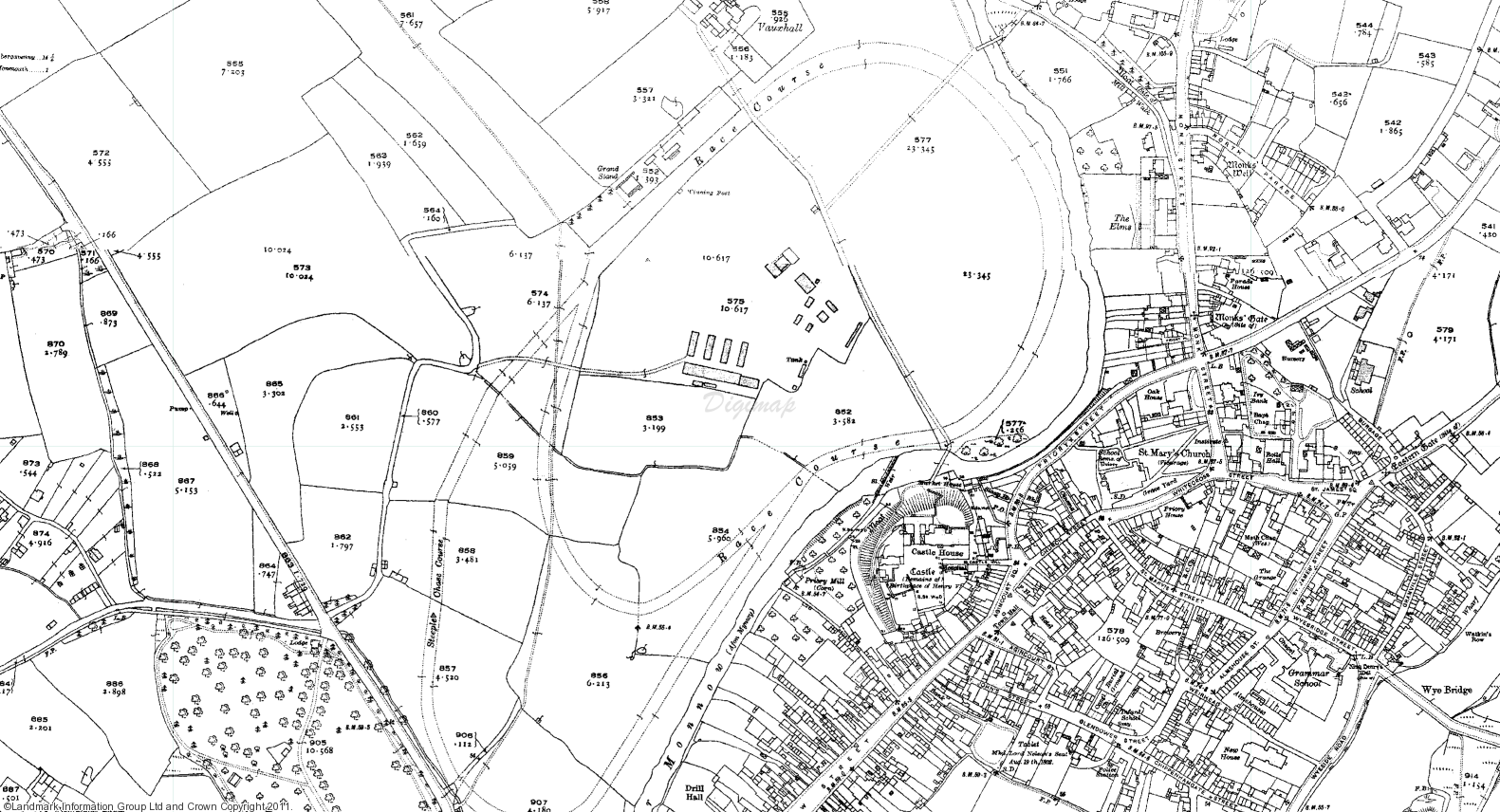
OS Map 1920 Showing Vauxhall Fields Horse Racing Course and the Army Camp at the Centre

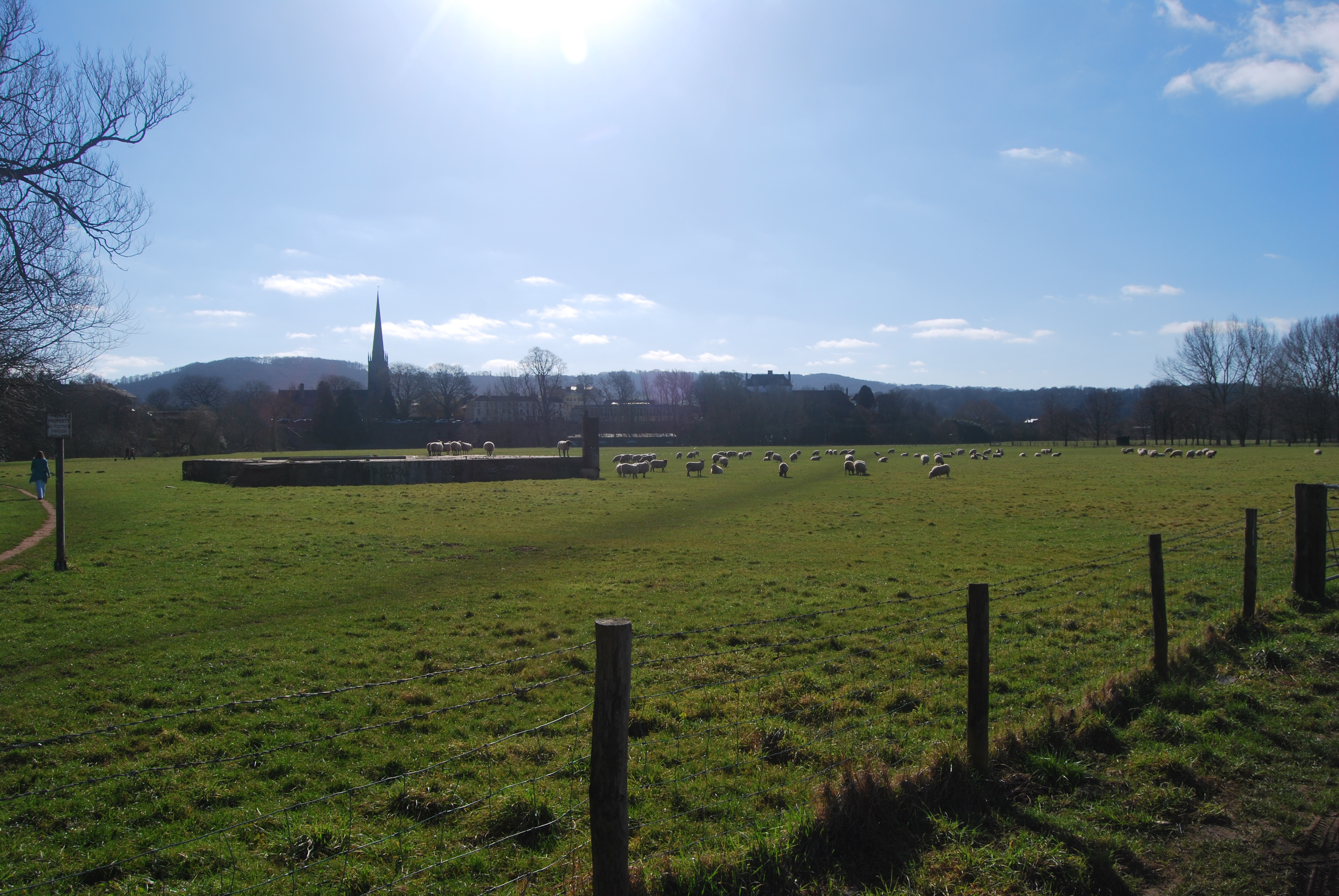
Looking toward Monmouth Town Centre

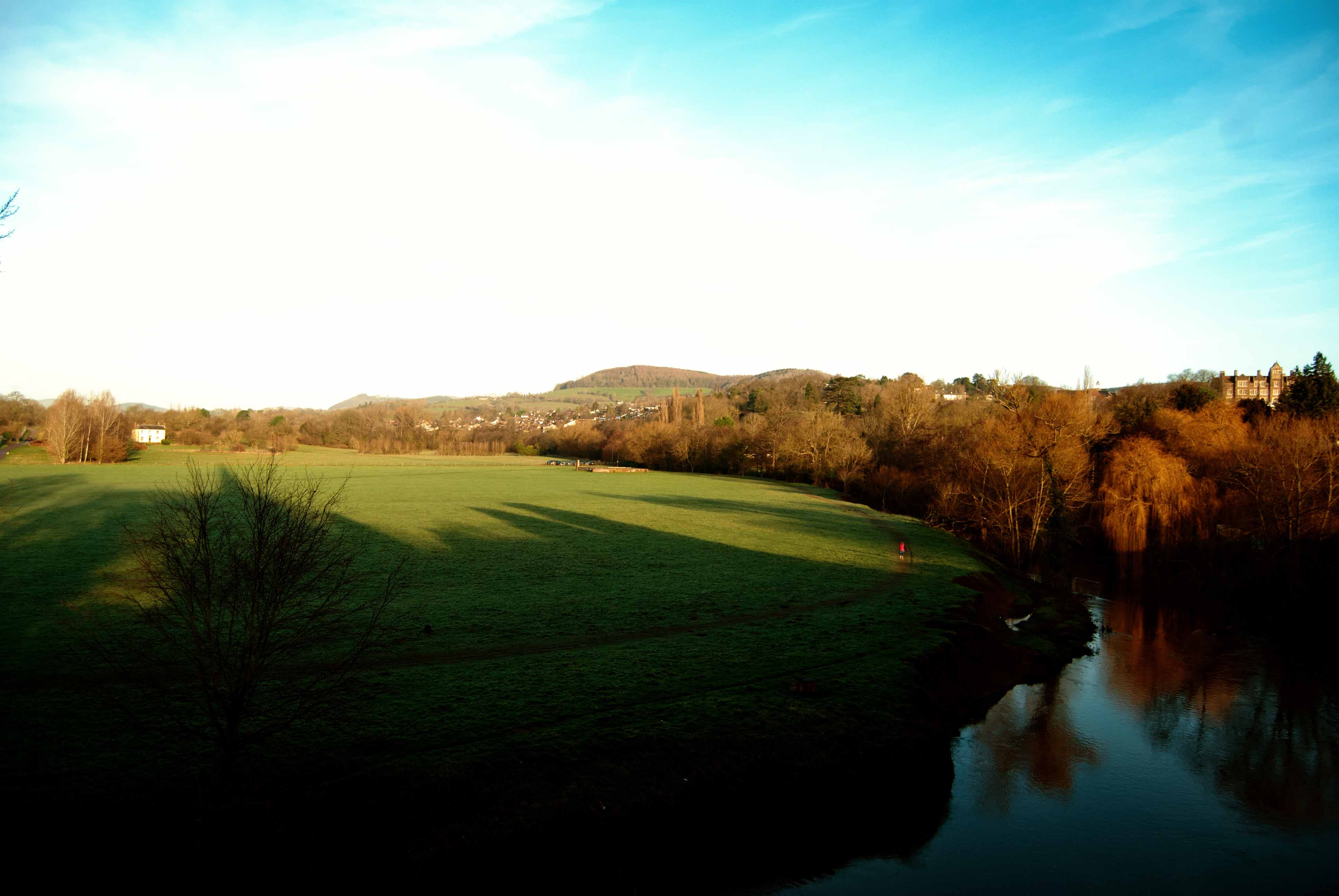
Vauxhall Fields looking north from the Slaughter Houses Monmouth

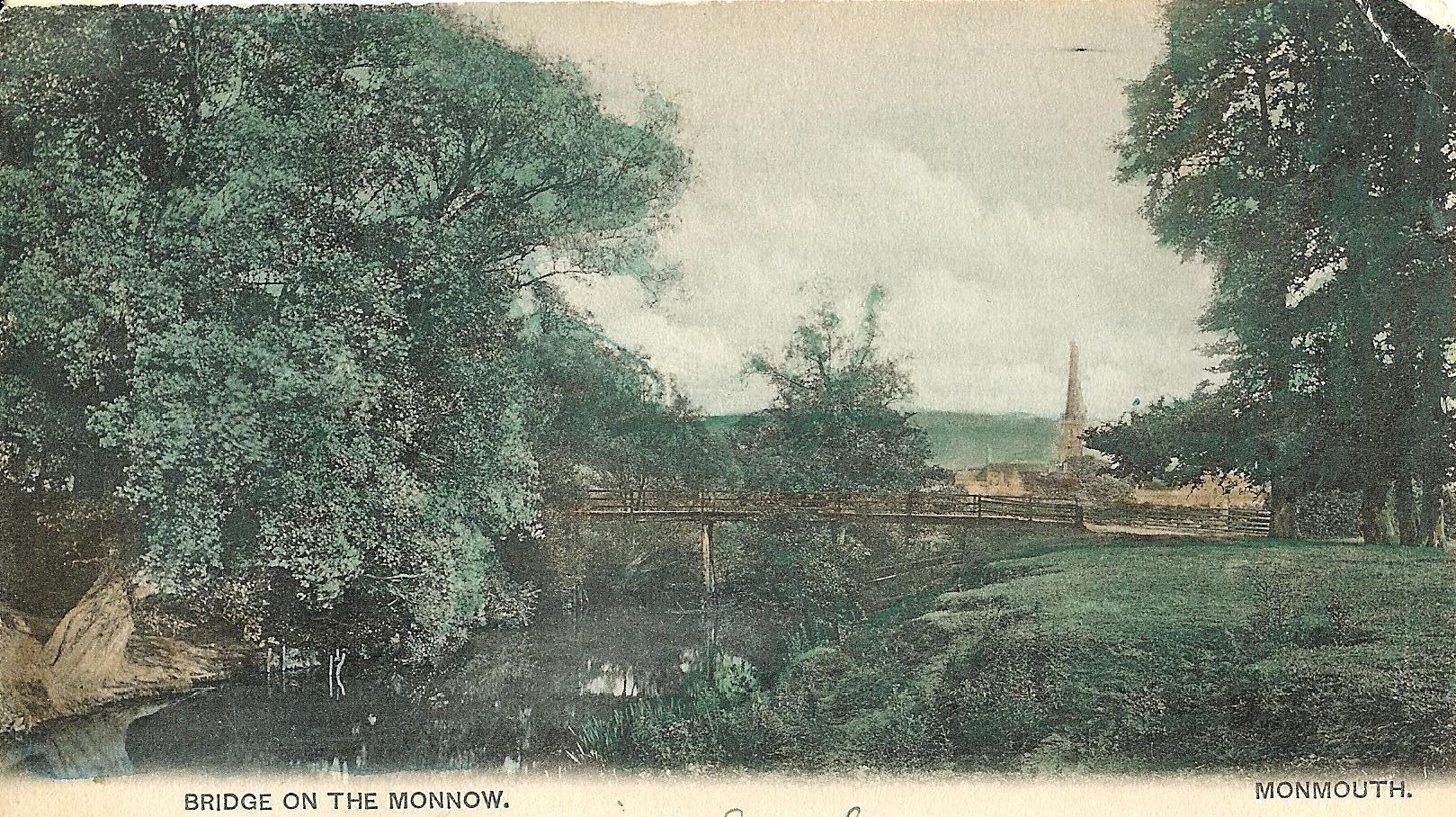
White Bridge at Vauxhall Fields – 1912

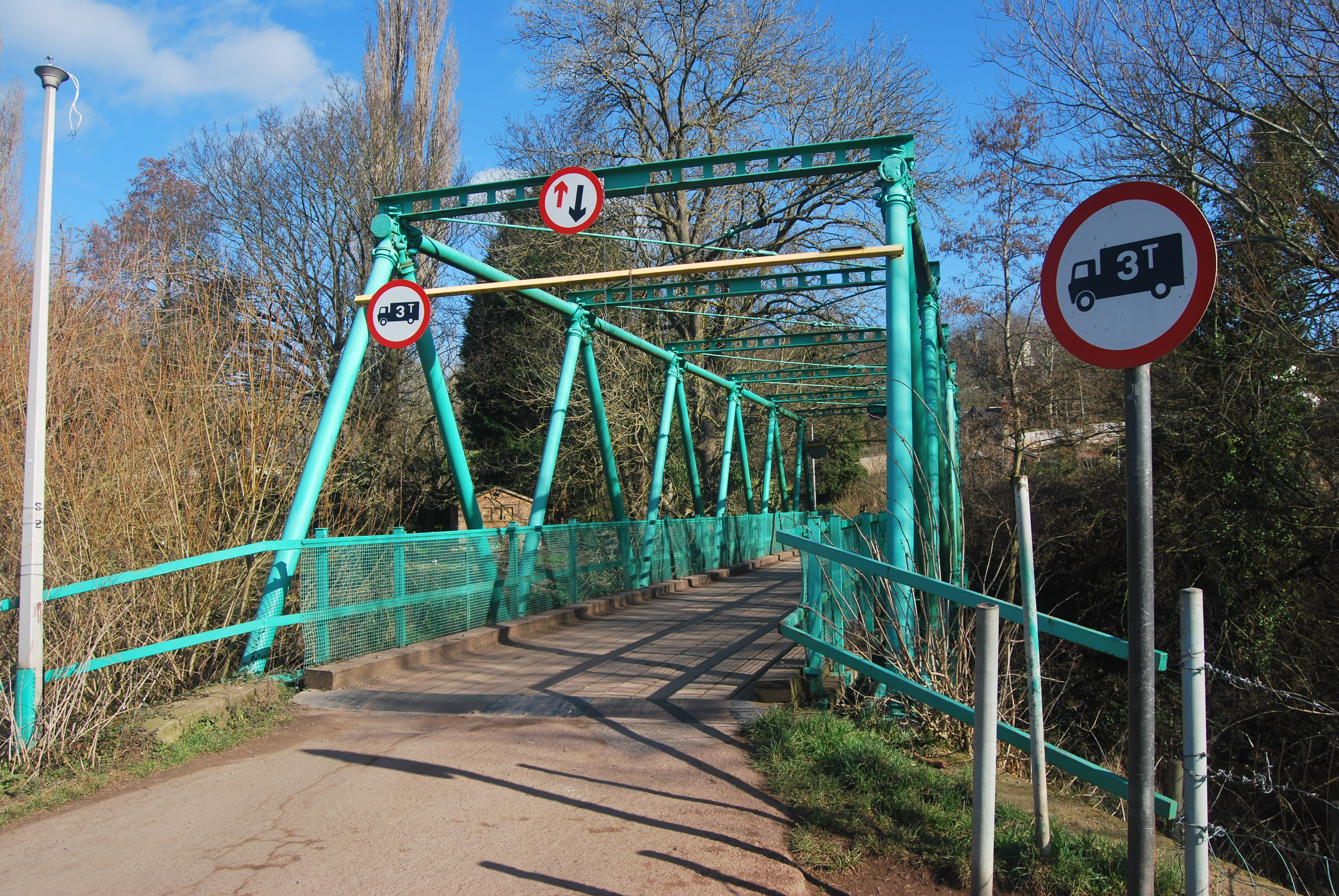
Inglis Bridge – 2012. Occupies the same position as the White bridge in 1905.

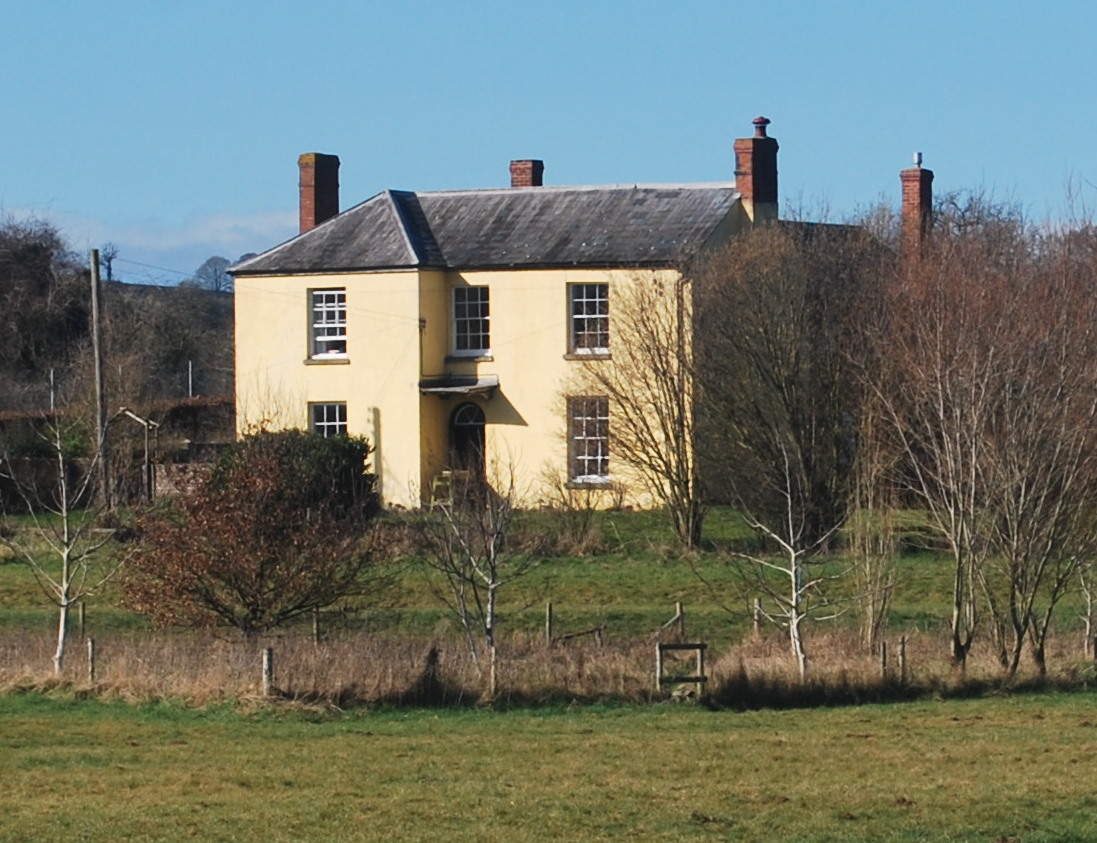
Vauxhall Farmhouse – Grade II Listed building – 2012

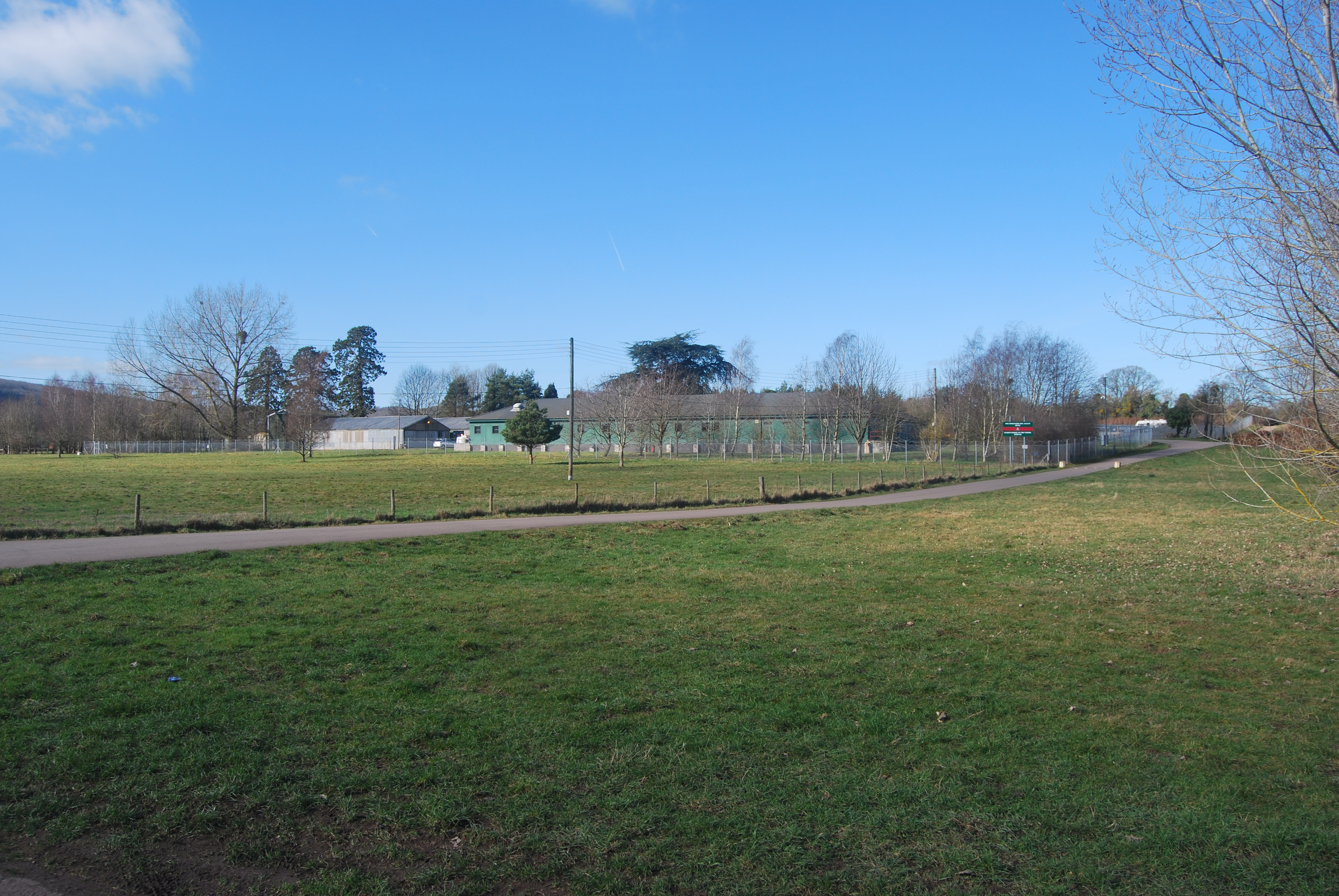
Military buildings in Vauxhall Camp

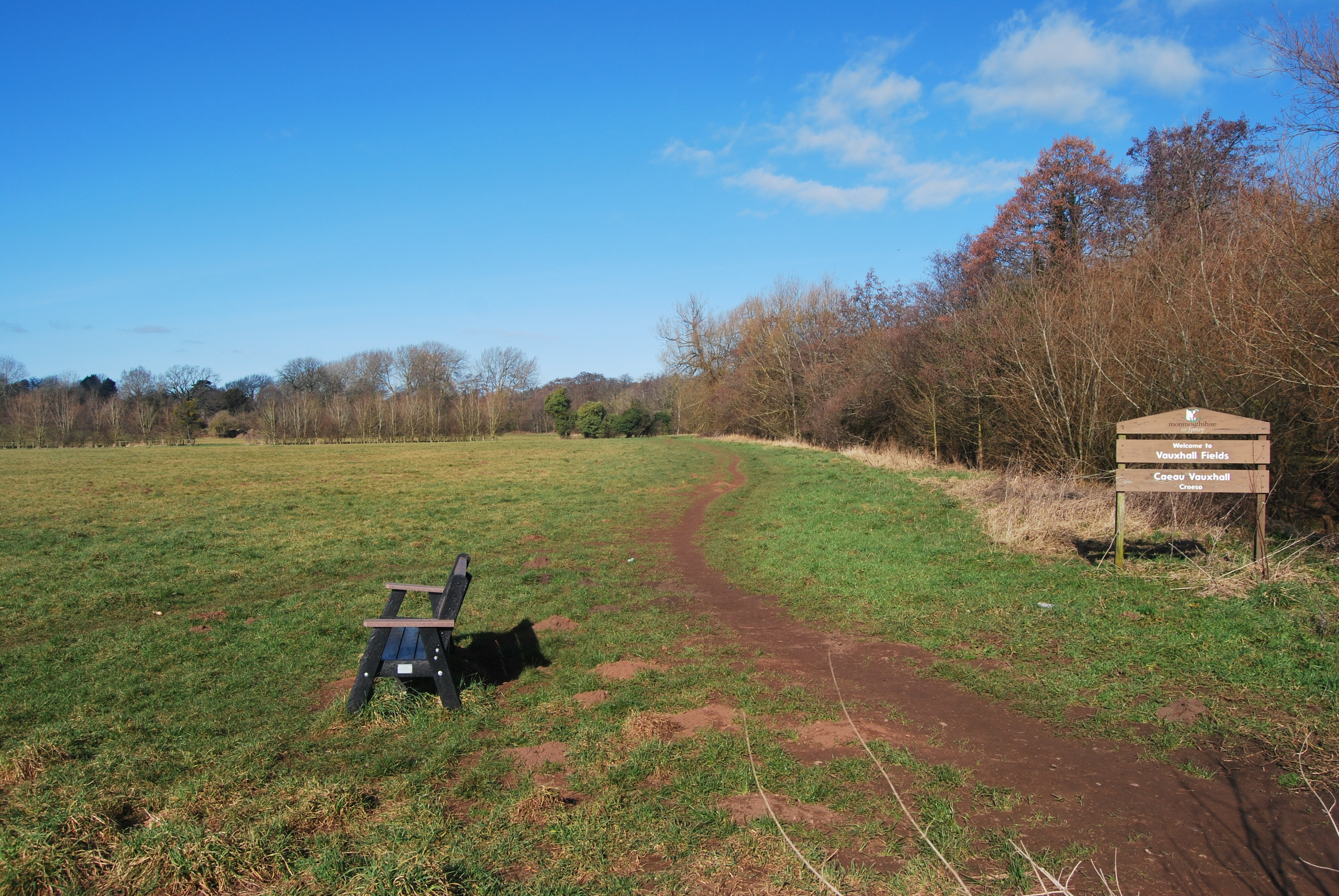
Vauxhall Fields Monmouth – North Facing

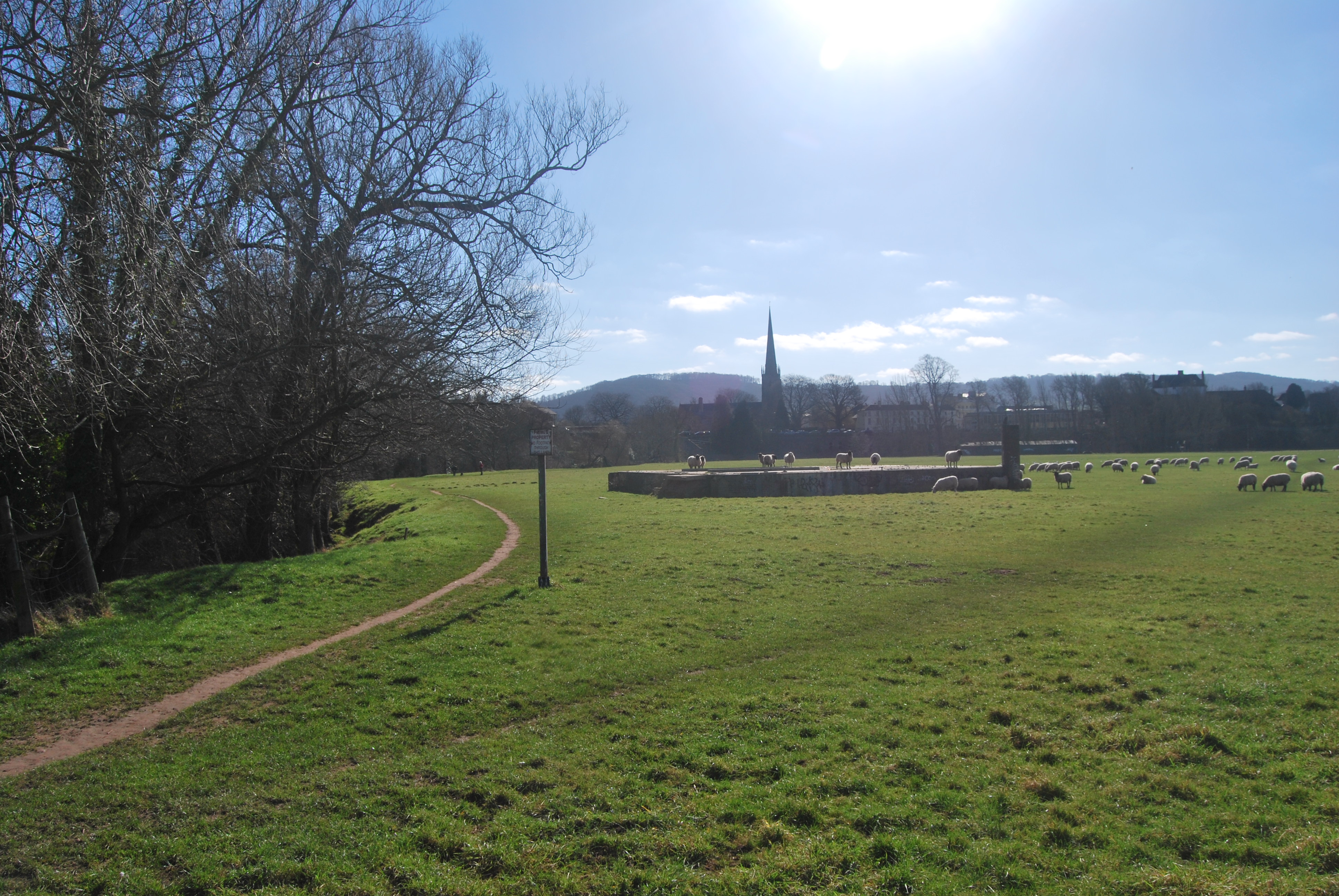
Fields Monmouth – South Facing
