= Monmouth Golf Club =

Coordinates: 51.826376°N 2.705028°W

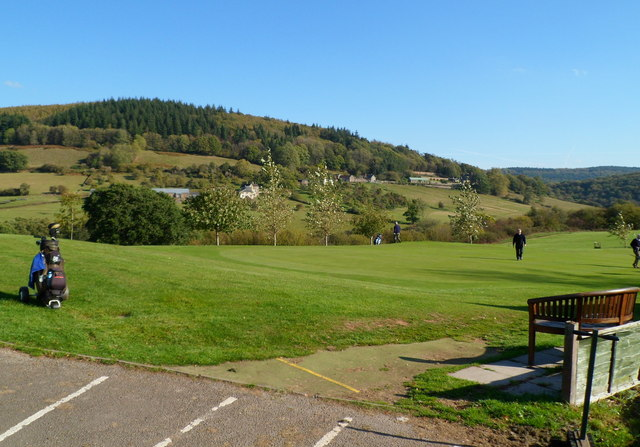

Club information
- Location: Monmouth, Wales
- Established: 1896
- Type: Country club, Golf course
- Owner: Members
- Tota holes: 18
- Website: Monmouth Golf Club
- Designed by: George Waldron
- Par: 69
- Length: 5,582 Yards

Monmouth Golf Club is an 18-hole golf club based just outside Monmouth at Leasbrook Lane, near Dixton.

The course is located on high ground to the east of the town with views of the Welsh hills, the Forest of Dean and the Wye Valley. The club claims to be one of the prettiest golf courses in Wales. The club has a short game practice area and a nine-hole practice putting green. Other facilities include a clubhouse, bar and shop

The hole names on the course are:

Hole	Name	Hole	Name
Hole 1	Arnotts	Hole 10	Rabbits
Hole 2	Cannes Folly	Hole 11	Long Haul
Hole 3	Manson's Cross	Hole 12	Cole's Hole
Hole 4	The Buckholt	Hole 13	Waldon Pulpit
Hole 5	Kymin View	Hole 14	Curtis' Corner
Hole 6	The Oasis	Hole 15	Two In One
Hole 7	The Struggle	Hole 16	Devil's Bunker
Hole 8	Cresta Run	Hole 17	Howard's Way
Hole 9	The Elbow	Hole 18	Last Gasp

== History ==
Monmouth Golf Club was formed on 25 June 1896 at a meeting held at the Kings Head Hotel, Monmouth.

The site of the club was initially Priory Farm. This proved unsuitable for golf and the club moved to Vauxhall Fields, taking over the Vauxhall Golf Club and its course. In 1903 the club moved to the Hendre Estate. The club moved again in 1905 to Troy Farm.

Membership in the early years was about 30 to 40 people, which was deemed low. The problem of low membership was attributed to the inability of the course to cope with long grass in the summer months. This was because the landlord of the ground, which was rented out as a golf course, wanted to make hay on the fairways as well as receiving rent for the course. A dispute arose regarding the cutting of the long grass by the members of the club which caused the landowner to complain that the club was exceeding the terms of the covenant. A court case followed, eventually leading to a High Court ruling in 1910 which defined a fairway. The ruling was made in the club's favour. The long grass problem led to the closure of the course in 1912. Several attempts were made to reopen but these were not successful until 1920 when the club was reformed at Dixton on part of the present course.

George Waldron was the club's first professional. In 1921 he laid out a nine-hole course, which opened on 1 October 1921.

In 1992, land was rented to enable a further nine holes. The full eighteen-hole course was opened on 18 July 1992 and the new clubhouse later that year.

Improvements in the drainage of the course and the construction of buggy paths around the course took place in the following years. In 2008 the club purchased the freehold of the previously rented area of the course, making the 18-hole course wholly owned by the members.
