= Inglis Bridge, Monmouth =

Grade II listed building and bridge in Monmouth, south-east Wales

Inglis Bridge
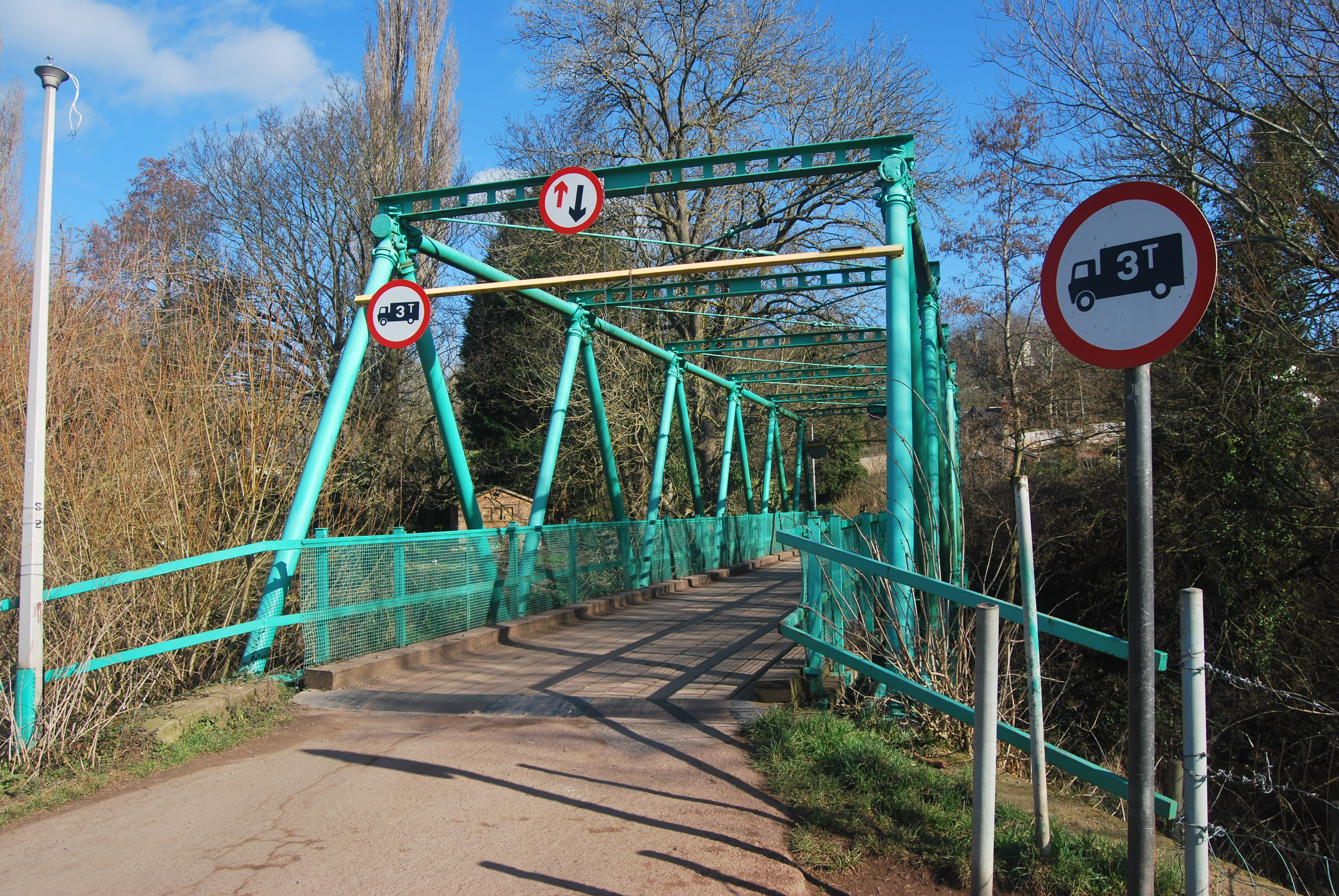
- View of the bridge looking east, taken in 2012 when the bridge was fully accessible
- Coordinates: 51.8169°N 2.7158°W
- Carries: Pedestrian traffic
- Crosses: River Monnow
- Locale: Monmouth, Monmouthshire, Wales

Characteristics
- Design: Inglis Mark II
- Material: Steel
- Total length: 27.4 m (90 ft)
- Width: 2.9 m (9 ft 6 in)
- No. of spans: 1

History
- Designer: Charles Inglis
- Construction end: 1931, refurbished 1988

Statistics
- Daily traffic: Pedestrian (originally vehicular) / currently closed to all traffic

Listed Building – Grade II
- Official name: Inglis Bridge over River Monnow
- Designated: 23 March 2011
- Reference no.: 87635

Location
- Interactive map of Inglis Bridge

The Inglis Bridge, Monmouth, Wales crosses the River Monnow linking Vauxhall Fields and the suburb of Osbaston. Designed by, and named after, Charles Inglis, the bridge was constructed in 1931 and refurbished in 1988. It is a Mark II model of an Inglis bridge, and the only known example in Britain of such a bridge still in public use. Access was limited to pedestrians in 2018, vehicular use being prohibited on safety grounds. In September 2024 the bridge was also closed to pedestrians due to safety concerns. Following a sustained local campaign, supported by Monmouth's member of parliament, the Ministry of Defence announced £1M in funding to repair the bridge and restore pedestrian access in 2026. The bridge is a Grade II listed structure.

== History ==
Sir Charles Inglis (31 July 1875 – 19 April 1952) was a British civil engineer. While a lecturer in mechanical engineering at King's College, Cambridge, Inglis joined the Cambridge University Officers' Training Corps and on the outbreak of World War 1 was commissioned into the Royal Engineers. Appointed director of the bridging department, he designed a transportable steel bridge that could be erected in a day. Named the Inglis bridge in his honour, the design remained in use by the British Army throughout the First World War and the inter-war period, until being superseded by the higher capacity Bailey bridge in 1940–1941.

The Inglis Bridge at Monmouth was built by the Royal Monmouthshire Royal Engineers (Militia) (R Mon RE (M)) in 1931. The regiment was, and is, based at Monmouth Castle, and the bridge provided access to its training ground on Vauxhall Fields. The regiment undertook the refurbishment of the bridge in 1988. The bridge was closed to vehicles in 2011 on safety grounds, although it was reopened shortly afterwards in the face of local opposition. The bridge was again closed to vehicles in 2018 amid arguments over the responsibility for the funding of repairs. It remains the only known example of such a bridge in the UK in public use. (Note: Another Inglis bridge remains, carrying a sewer pipe across the Basingstoke Canal at Aldershot, but this is not in public use; it was listed at Grade II in 2024. A third example was identified at RAF Sandtoft, Lincolnshire in 2018. It has been dismantled and a section is to be re-erected at the Royal Engineers Museum in Kent.) (Note: A replica Inglis Bridge was erected in a park in Leyland, Lancashire in 2016.) The Inglis Bridge has been closed to pedestrians since September 2024 due to safety concerns. Following a sustained local campaign, supported by Monmouth's member of parliament, Catherine Fookes, the Ministry of Defence, which retains responsibility for the bridge, announced £1M in funding for repairs with the aim of restoring pedestrian access by the end of 2025. The intended completion date for the work was later revised to Easter 2026. In February 2026, work was further delayed after attempts to raise the bridge and place it on Vauxhall Fields failed, due to the weight of the bridge being greater than projected.

== Location ==
Vauxhall Fields was developed as a pleasure ground in the 18th century by John Tibbs, landlord of the Beaufort Arms Hotel. In the 1850s, the headquarters of the RMRE were established at Monmouth Castle, and a training camp was developed on Vauxhall Fields in the early 20th century. In 1905, access over the River Monnow to the camp was facilitated by the construction of a wooden bridge, known as the White Bridge. This was replaced by the Inglis Bridge in 1931, with the latter using the masonry footings of the former.

== Description ==
The bridge is constructed of tubular steel and comprises a 27.4 m (90 ft) single span with a 2.9 m (9 ft 6 in) deck. It is supported by longitudinal stringers and two spans of lateral bracing. The design is of the Warren truss type. The Inglis bridges were constructed using prefabricated components, allowing for rapid deployment and reuse in combat conditions. The Mark I design comprised steel tubes of differing lengths, which led to errors during assembly. The Mark II model standardised the steel tubes used to a single length. Inglis Bridge is a Grade II listed structure.

== Sources ==
- Ellis, Chris; Chamberlain, Peter (1976). Handbook of the British Army 1943. London: Arms & Armour Press. ISBN 978-0-882-54409-0. OCLC 2694865.
- Kissack, Keith (1975). Monmouth: The Making of a County Town. Chichester: Phillimore. ISBN 978-0-850-33209-4. OCLC 255539468.
- McFetrich, David (2019). An Encyclopaedia of British Bridges. Barnsley, South Yorkshire: Pen and Sword Books. ISBN 978-1-526-75296-3.
