= Inglis Bridge, Aldershot =

Bridge in Hampshire, England

Coordinates: 51°15′47″N 0°46′05″W

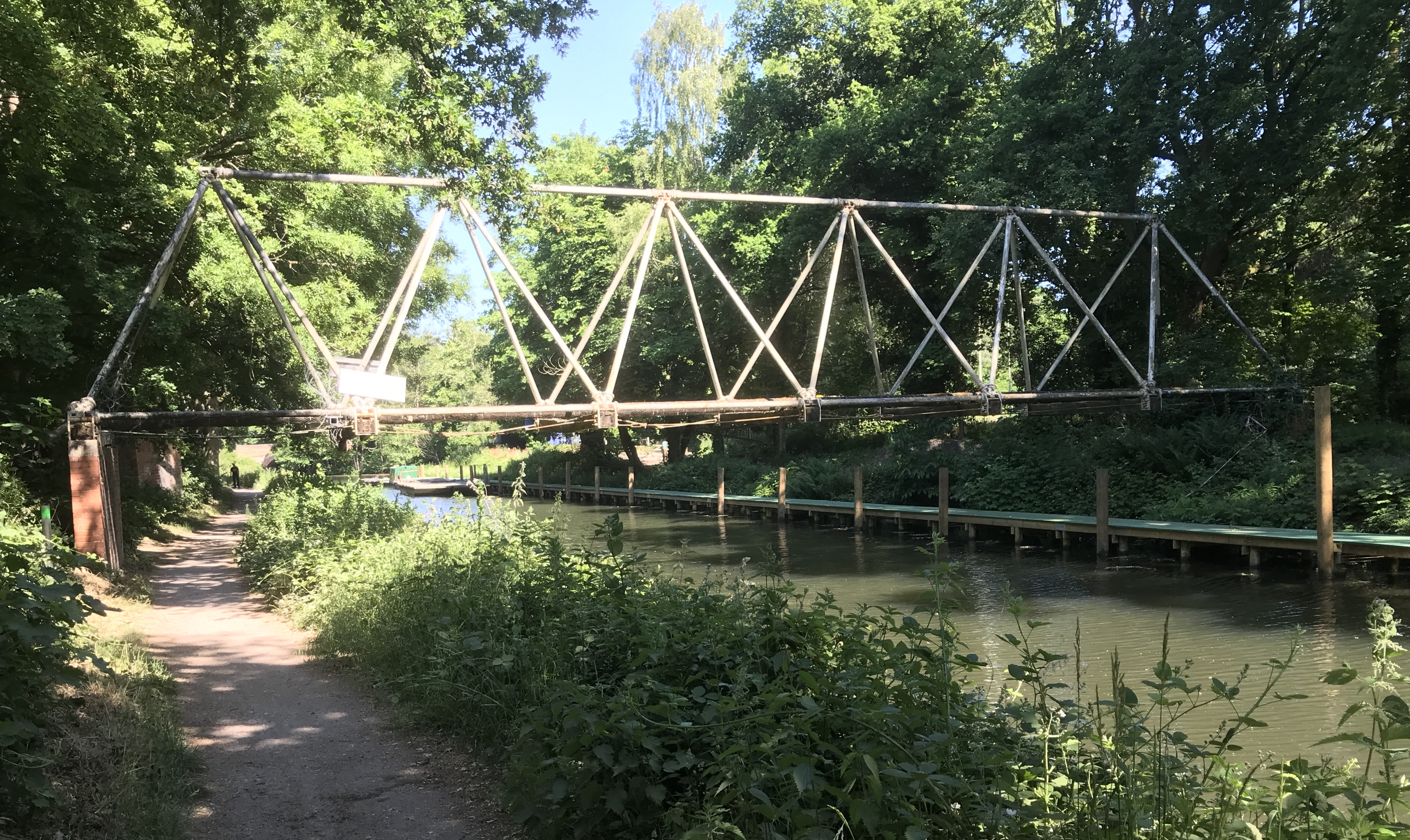
Inglis Pyramid Bridge crossing the Basingstoke Canal near Aldershot in 2020

The Inglis Bridge near Aldershot in Hampshire, carries a sewer pipe across the Basingstoke Canal. Also known as the Inglis Pyramid Bridge, or the Inglis Pipe Bridge, it is an early form of military portable prefabricated steel bridge, manufactured in 1916. It is a unique survivor of this type in England, after a similar bridge in Lincolnshire was removed after 2017. The Aldershot bridge is located near Laffan's Road and Aldershot Wharf car park. It is owned by the Ministry of Defence, and was listed at Grade II in 2024.

The Inglis Portable Military Bridge (Light Type) was designed by the engineer Charles Inglis, in the First World War as a lightweight, portable and reusable bridge that could be assembled or disassembled by a team of soldiers in the field within a matter of minutes. The original design used modular units built from 8 ft (2.4 m) lengths of steel pipe, joined by pre-cast junctions to heavy steel transoms, with four pipes meeting at the apex to form pyramids which would be linked longitudinally. Ten of this first design, the light type, were constructed during the war, designed as a footbridge allowing passage by soldiers in single file. A similar "heavy" type of Inglis bridge was developed to bear vehicles, and later models used steel pipes joining rectangular and then square frames, known as Type I and Type II respectively, capable of carrying tanks across wider gaps. Developments of the Inglis bridge continue in use until the Second World War, until it was replaced by the Bailey bridge.

The Aldershot bridge comprises six pyramids forming three W-shaped Warren trusses on each side, sloped to meet at the apex. It is believed to have been brought back to England from France after the First World War, and constructed by military engineers as a training exercise. It has been in place since at least 1963 and possibly before 1944.

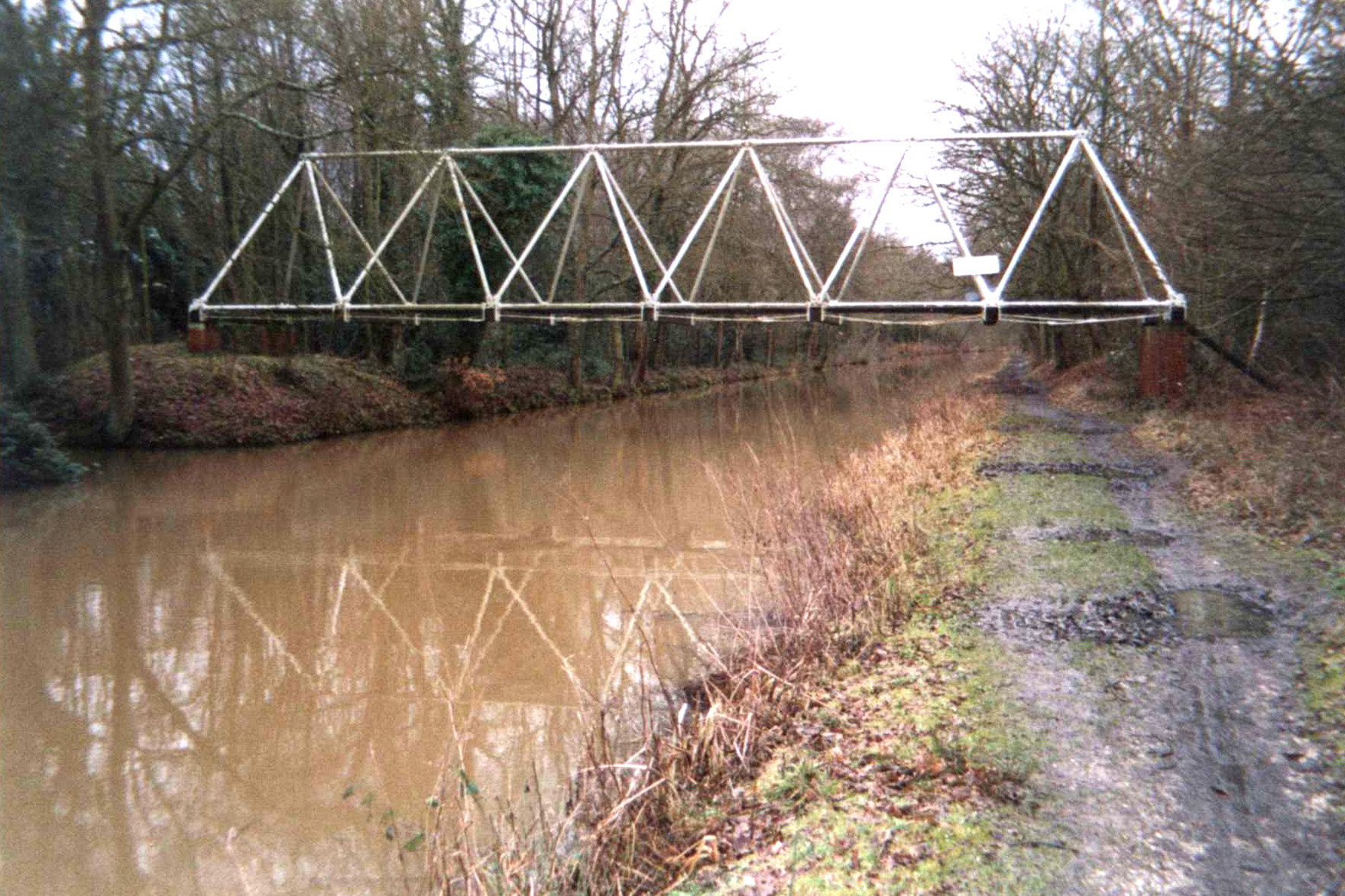
Bridge in 2001

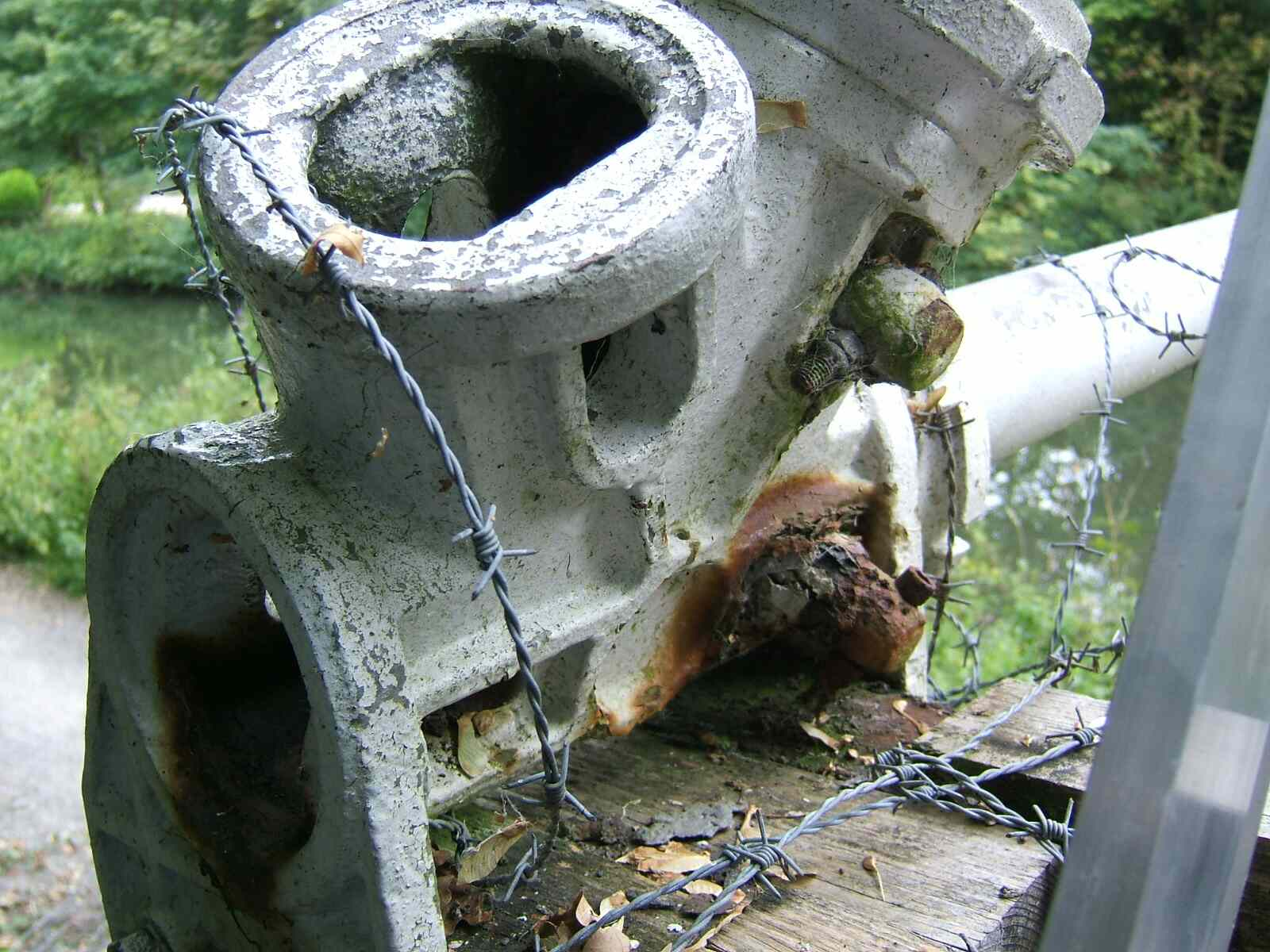
Bridge connector

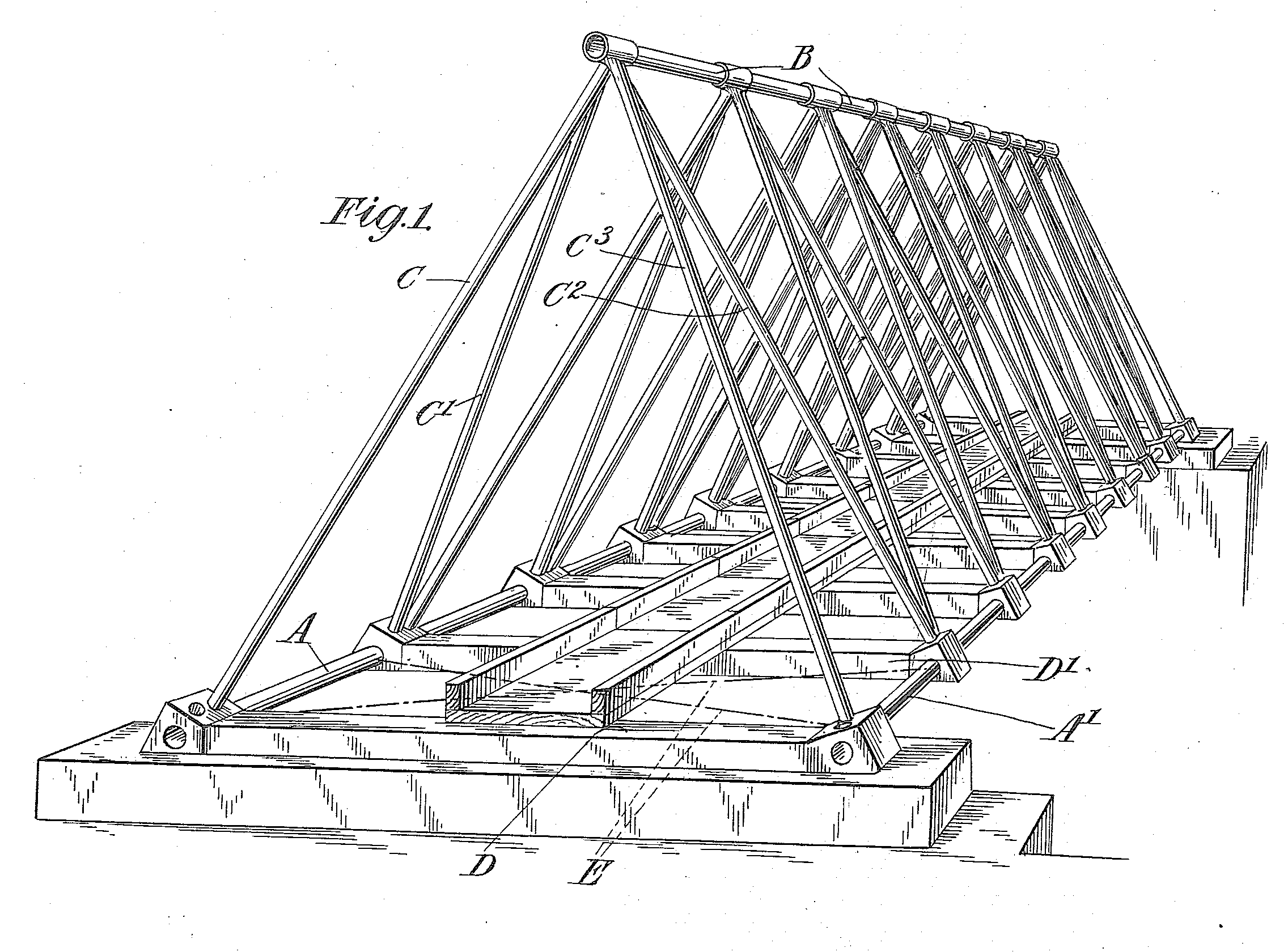
Diagram from patent filed in 1916

== See also ==
The Inglis Bridge, Monmouth is a Type II Inglis bridge, constructed in 1931 using longer pipes and heavier crossbeams and braces.
