= Catherine Fookes =

British politician

Catherine Fookes MP
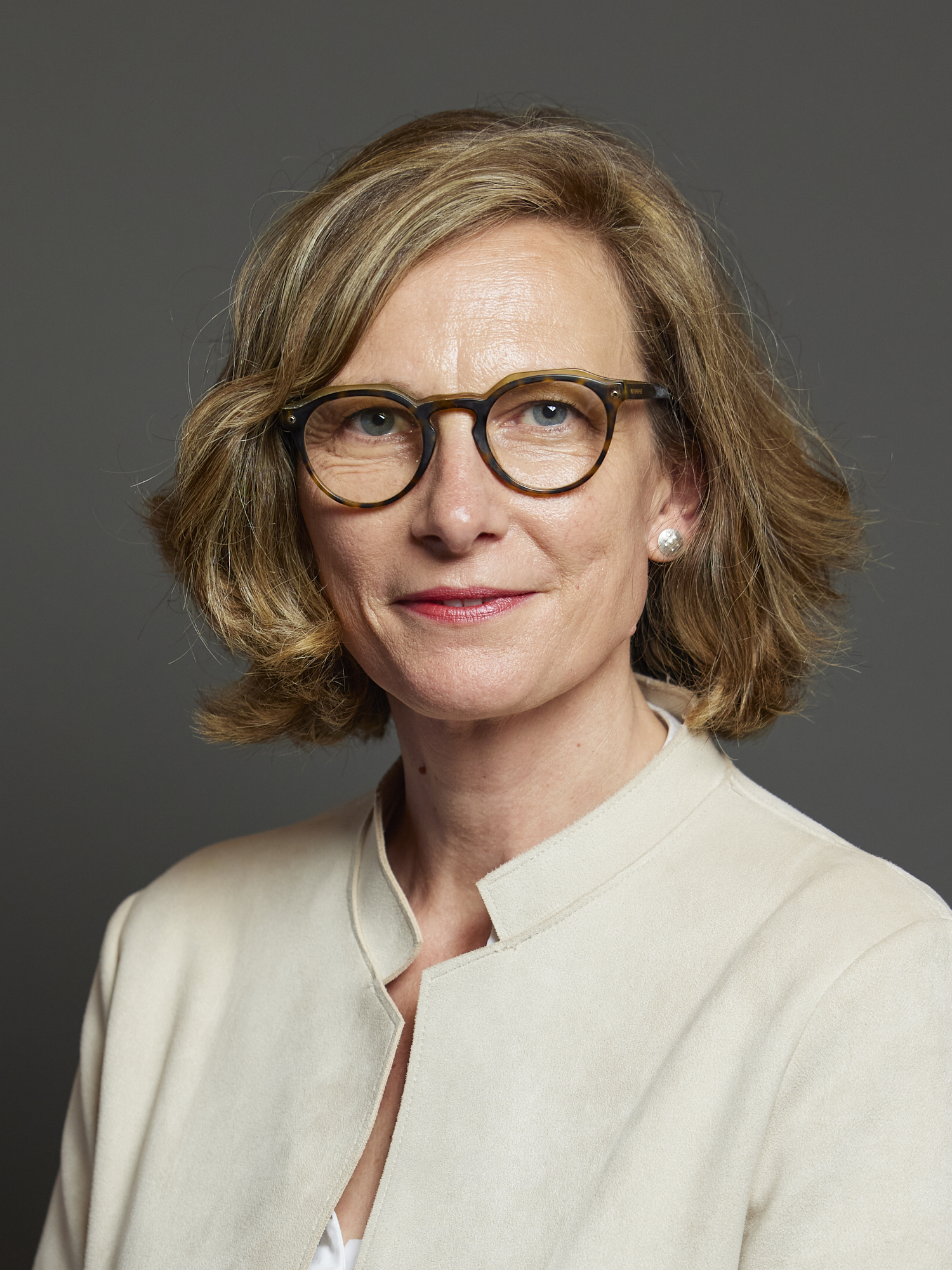
- Official portrait, 2024

Parliamentary Private Secretary to the Prime Minister
- In office 11 September 2025 – 20 July 2026 Serving with Abena Oppong-Asare and Jon Pearce
- Prime Minister: Keir Starmer
- Preceded by: Chris Ward; Liz Twist

Member of Parliament for Monmouthshire
- Incumbent
- Assumed office 4 July 2024
- Preceded by: David TC Davies
- Majority: 3,338 (6.5%)

Monmouthshire County Councillor for Town Ward
- In office 5 May 2022 – 22 September 2024
- Preceded by: Ward established
- Succeeded by: Martin Newell

Personal details
- Born: 21 October 1970 (age 56)
- Party: Labour
- Education: Godolphin School; Middlesex University; University of Bath
- Website: Official website

Catherine Ann Fookes (born October 1970) is a British Labour Party politician who has been the Member of Parliament (MP) for Monmouthshire since 2024. She was a Parliamentary Private Secretary to Prime Minister Keir Starmer from September 2025 to July 2026.

== Education ==
Fookes was born in 1970 and was educated at the Godolphin School in Salisbury. She later studied at Middlesex Polytechnic studying Business studies and French, and later she did a master's degree in Development Studies at the University of Bath.

== Professional life ==
Fookes worked as a campaigner at ActionAid, Sustain: the alliance for better food and farming and the Organic Trade Board. She served as a board member on the Food and Drink Wales industry board helping to grow and promote the industry in Wales. In 2017 she became CEO of the Women's Equality Network Wales and chair of the Welsh think tank, Fabians Cymru. She is a member of the Fabian Society's executive committee.

== Political career ==
Fookes contested Monmouth at the 2016 Assembly election, coming second place.

In 2017 Fookes contested the Wyesham ward on Monmouthshire County Council. She came second, by 24 votes, to the Welsh Conservatives' Laura Anne Jones. In 2022 she was successfully elected to the council, representing the Town ward in Monmouth.

While on the council she job-shared the equalities and engagement portfolio on the council. She quit her portfolio after being selected as Labour parliamentary candidate for the 2024 UK general election and to work on the campaign full-time.

In the 2024 general election, Fookes was elected as MP for Monmouthshire with a majority of 3,338 (6.5%), defeating former Secretary of State for Wales David TC Davies. She resigned as a local councillor in September 2024. In January 2025, Fookes was elected as a co-chair for the All-Party Parliamentary Group (APPG) for the Western Gateway - a body aimed at boosting economic development in Wales - but the group was forced to close in April 2025, after the UK and Welsh Governments cancelled its funding.

In the September 2025 reshuffle, Prime Minister Keir Starmer appointed Fookes as one of his parliamentary private secretaries. She left the post on the appointment of Andy Burnham as Prime Minister in July 2026.

Fookes served on the Water (Special Measures) Bill committee. Fookes has campaigned on local issues such as repairing Inglis Bridge in Monmouth and implementing step free access at Chepstow Station. Fookes voted in favour of the UK government taxing farmers with its proposed inheritance tax. Fookes faced criticism from farming unions over the decision.

Fookes voted in favour of removing the winter fuel allowance to pensioners.

In January 2025, Fookes voted against an inquiry being held into grooming gangs, calling it a "political stunt".

During the potential Labour Party leadership contest in May 2026, Fookes disagreed with those calling for Keir Starmer and Chancellor Rachel Reeves to resign, stating she supported both.

Parliament of the United Kingdom
New constituency	Member of Parliament for Monmouthshire; 2024–present	Incumbent
