= Charles Inglis (engineer) =

British civil engineer (1875–1952)

Charles Inglis OBE FRS
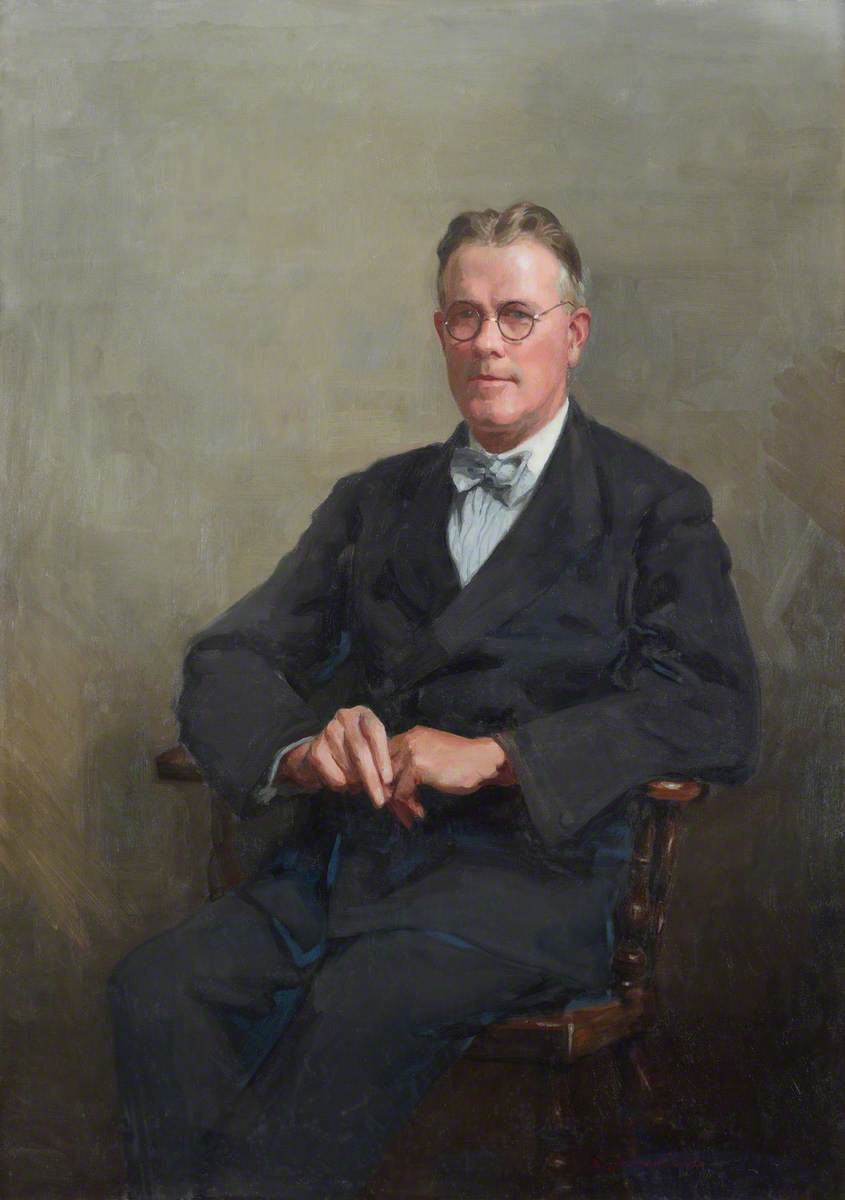
- 1926 portrait
- Born: 31 July 1875; Worcester, England
- Died: 19 April 1952 (aged 76); Southwold, Suffolk, England
- Education: King's College, Cambridge
- Spouse: Eleanor Moffatt
- Children: Two daughters
- Engineering career
- Discipline: Civil, Mechanical, Structural
- Institutions: Institution of Civil Engineers (president), Institution of Mechanical Engineers (honorary member), Institution of Naval Architects (council member), Institution of Structural Engineers (council member), Institution of Waterworks Engineers (council member), Royal Society (fellow)
- Significant design: Inglis Bridge
- Awards: Telford Medal; Charles Parsons medal Fellow of the Royal Society

Sir Charles Edward Inglis (/ˈɪŋɡəlz/; 31 July 1875 – 19 April 1952) was a British civil engineer. The son of a medical doctor, he was educated at Cheltenham College and won a scholarship to King's College, Cambridge, where he would later forge a career as an academic. Inglis spent a two-year period with the engineering firm run by John Wolfe-Barry before he returned to King's College as a lecturer. Working with Professors James Alfred Ewing and Bertram Hopkinson, he made several important studies into the effects of vibration on structures and defects on the strength of plate steel.

Inglis served in the Royal Engineers during the First World War and invented the Inglis Bridge, a reusable steel bridging system – the precursor to the more famous Bailey bridge of the Second World War. In 1916 he was placed in charge of bridge design and supply at the War Office and, with Giffard Le Quesne Martel, pioneered the use of temporary bridges with tanks. Inglis retired from military service in 1919 and was appointed an Officer of the Order of the British Empire. He returned to Cambridge University after the war as a professor and head of the Engineering Department. Under his leadership, the department became the largest in the university and one of the best regarded engineering schools in the world. Inglis retired from the department in 1943.

Inglis was associated with the Institution of Naval Architects, Institution of Civil Engineers, Institution of Mechanical Engineers, Institution of Structural Engineers, Institution of Waterworks Engineers and British Waterworks Association; he sat on several of their councils and was elected the Institution of Civil Engineers' president for the 1941–42 session. He was also a fellow of the Royal Society. Inglis sat on the board of inquiry investigating the loss of the airship R101 in 1930 and was chair of a Ministry of War Transport railway modernisation committee in 1946. Knighted in 1945, he spent his later years developing his theories on the education of engineers and wrote a textbook on applied mechanics. He has been described as the greatest teacher of engineering of his time and has a building named in his honour at Cambridge University.

== Early life and career ==
Charles Inglis was the second son of Dr. Alexander Inglis (a general practitioner in Worcester) and his first wife, Florence, the daughter of newspaper proprietor John Frederick Feeney. His elder brother was the historian John Alexander Inglis FRSE Their father, Alexander Inglis was born in Scotland to a respectable family – his grandfather, John Inglis, was an Admiral in the Royal Navy and had captained HMS Belliqueux at the Battle of Camperdown in 1797.

Charles Inglis was born on 31 July 1875. He was not expected to survive and was hurriedly baptised in his father's drawing room; his mother died from complications eleven days later. His family moved to Cheltenham and Inglis was schooled at Cheltenham College from 1889 to 1894. In his final year, he was elected head boy and received a scholarship to study the Mathematics Tripos at King's College, Cambridge. Inglis was 22nd wrangler (Note: At Cambridge students of the mathematics tripos are graded by exam results into three groups. The top performing students were known as "wranglers" with lower achieving students known as "senior optimes" and "junior optimes", in a similar manner to the current British undergraduate degree classification system. The top scoring student was known as the "senior wrangler" with the other wranglers being named for their position within the class. Thus, Inglis achieved the twenty-second highest mark in the mathematics tripos of 1897. Students ceased to be ranked within the classes after 1909.) when he received his Bachelor of Arts degree in 1897; he remained for a fourth year, achieving first class honours in Mechanical Sciences. Inglis was a keen sportsman and enjoyed long-distance running, walking, mountaineering and sailing. At Cambridge, he nearly achieved a blue for long-distance running but was forced to withdraw from a significant race because of a pulled muscle. He was also a follower of the Cambridge University Rugby Union team, watching their matches at Grange Road.

After graduation, Inglis began work as an apprentice for the civil engineering firm of John Wolfe-Barry & Partners. He worked as a draughtsman in the drawing office for several months before being placed with Alexander Gibb, who was acting as resident engineer on an extension to the Metropolitan District Railway between Whitechapel and Bow. Inglis was responsible for the design and supervision of all thirteen bridges on the route. It was during this time that he began his lifelong study of vibration and its effects on materials, particularly bridges.

== Early academic career ==
In 1901 Inglis was made a fellow of King's College after writing a thesis entitled The Balancing of Engines, the first general treatment of the subject – which was becoming increasingly important due to the growing speeds of locomotives. In the same year, he received his Master of Arts degree and was accepted as an Institution of Civil Engineers (ICE) associate member after winning the institution's Miller Prize for his student paper on The Geometrical Methods in Investigating Mechanical Problems. Inglis left his employment with Wolfe-Barry, having completed two years of his five-year apprenticeship, to return to King's College and become an assistant to James Alfred Ewing, professor of mechanism and applied mechanics. Inglis maintained his interest in engine balancing and filed a US patent on 16 April 1902 for an improved engine with the cylinders mounted end to end to balance out the forces acting between them.

Professor Ewing left the university in 1903 to become the first Director of Naval Education at the Admiralty but Inglis remained; he was appointed a university demonstrator in mechanism by Professor Bertram Hopkinson, Ewing's successor, and worked with him to study the effects of vibration. Inglis was promoted to lecturer of mechanical engineering in 1908. Hopkinson recognised Inglis's academic abilities and assigned him the heaviest teaching load of all the staff, covering statics, dynamics, structural engineering theory, materials engineering, drawing, engine balance and the design of steel girders and reinforced concrete. Inglis later recalled that if he wished to learn more on a subject then he volunteered to teach a course on it. From 1911 Inglis became involved in hydraulic engineering and served on the board of the Cambridge University and Town Waterworks Company, serving as deputy chairman from 1924 to 1928 and chairman from 1928 to 1952.

Inglis conducted research into the problem of fracture in the metal plates of ships' hulls and noticed that the rivet holes along the path of a crack were often deformed into an elliptical shape. This phenomenon led him to investigate the magnification of stress caused at the edges of an elliptical defect; in 1913 he published a paper of his theories that has been described as his most important contribution to engineering and the first serious modern work on the fracturing of materials. Alan Arnold Griffith later drew on Inglis's paper for his work on the apparent discrepancy between calculated and actual strengths of materials. Inglis's 1913 paper has been cited by around 1,200 subsequent works.

Inglis had married Eleanor Moffat, daughter of Lieutenant-Colonel Herbert Moffat of the South Wales Borderers, in 1901, having met on holiday in Switzerland. They lived at Maitland House, Cambridge, until 1904, when Inglis built a house he named Balls Grove at nearby Grantchester, where his two daughters were born and the family resided until 1925. They later moved to 10 Latham Road, which Inglis renamed Niddrys after the first known address of his ancestors in Edinburgh.

== Military service ==
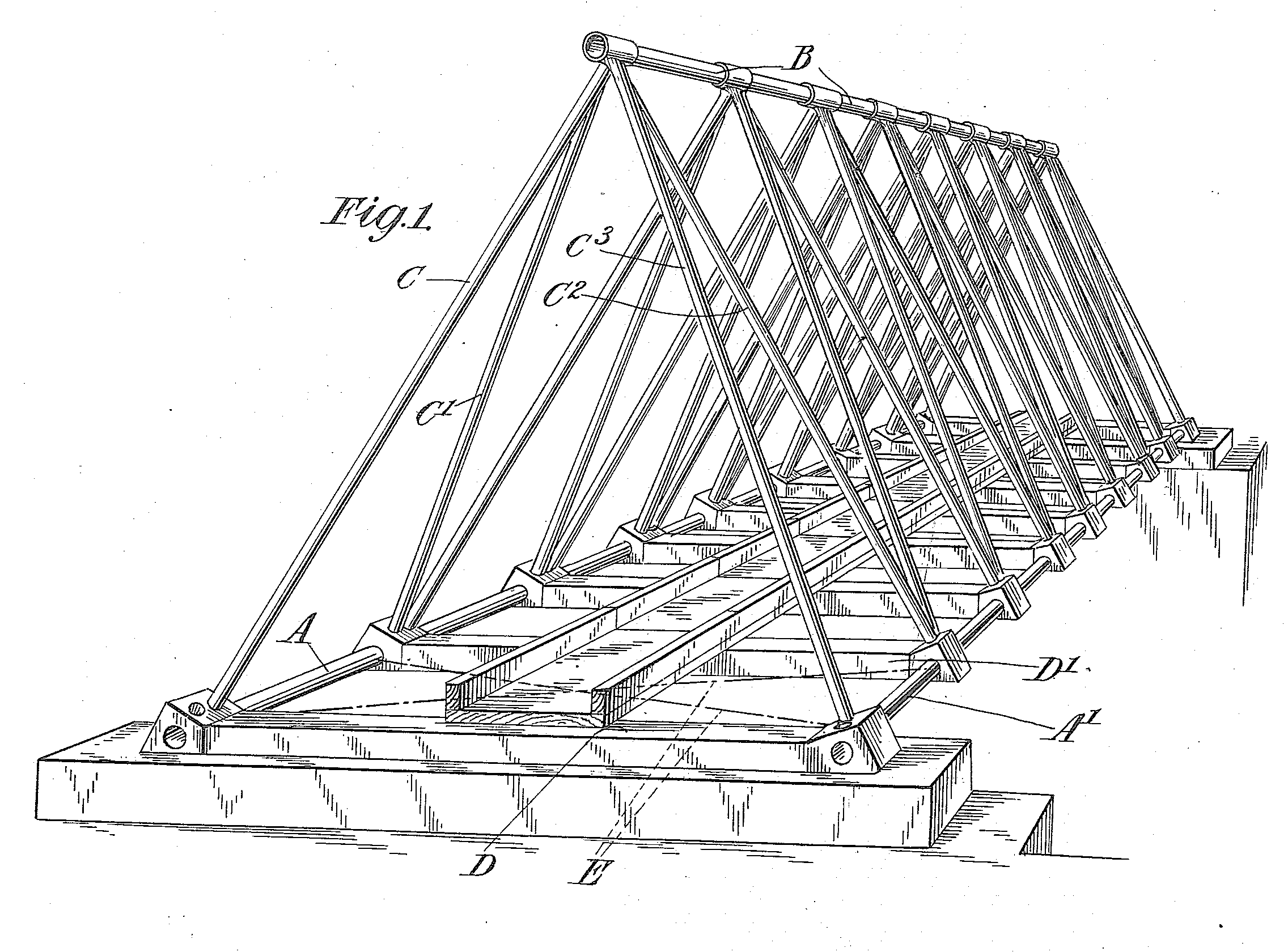
An Inglis "pyramid" footbridge variant; a surviving example in Aldershot is Grade II listed

Inglis was involved with the Cambridge University Officer Training Corps (CUOTC), being commissioned a second lieutenant on 24 May 1909. He served with the CUOTC's engineering detachment and noticed that when the unit was deployed on field days with the rest of the force it often had little to do. To remedy this, Inglis designed a reusable steel bridge, with the intention that it could be erected and dismantled by the unit in a single afternoon. An army general who was inspecting the unit noticed his design and offered advice: "If you're making anything for the army, keep it simple – no complicated gadgets". Upon the outbreak of the First World War in 1914, Inglis volunteered for active service in the British Army and was officially listed as an Assistant Instructor in the School of Military Engineering, with the temporary rank of lieutenant. The army expressed interest in Inglis's bridge design; it was approved for use by a panel of army officers that included the general who had first commented on the design, to whom Inglis said "I hope, Sir, you will find I have profited by your advice". The design remained in service with the British Army until the higher-capacity Bailey bridge was introduced during the Second World War.

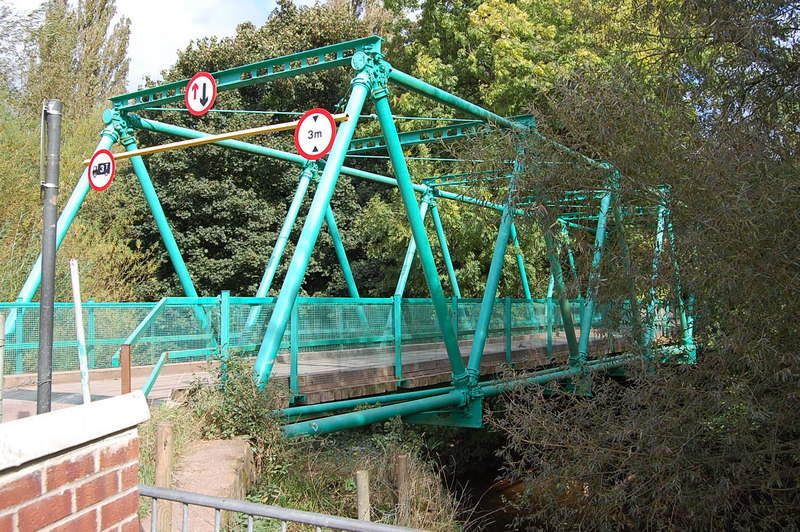
A surviving Inglis Bridge (Mark II) over the River Monnow

The Inglis Bridge was designed so that all of its components could be moved by manpower alone; moreover, it could be erected with few tools in a short span of time – a troop of 40 sappers could erect a 60-foot (18 m) bridge in 12 hours. The design was composed of a series of 15-foot (4.6 m) Warren truss bays made from tubular steel sections, to a maximum span of six bays (90 feet or 27 metres). The design went through three revisions, with the Mark II replacing the original design's variable-length tubes with identical-length ones and, during the Second World War, the Mark III using higher strength steel but smaller tube diameters, increasing the carrying capacity to 26 long tons (26 t). In addition to his bridge design, during the war's course he developed the similar Inglis Tubular Observation Tower. Inglis received a US Patent for his bridge on 25 April 1916 and for the type of joints used in it on 26 June 1917.

In 1916, Inglis was placed in charge of bridge design and supply at the War Office in which role he was a proponent for the increased use of girder bridges in military applications. It was Inglis that first proved to the army that the heavy components essential to girder bridges did not prevent their rapid assembly in field conditions. This led to the greater use of such bridges, particularly the Inglis Bridge, for tanks later in the war. He received promotion to the rank of captain on the General List of Officers on 6 May 1916 and became a staff captain attached to the War Office on 26 June 1917. He was promoted to the brevet rank of major as part of the King's Birthday Honours on 3 June 1918 and later that year worked with Giffard Le Quesne Martel to develop some of the earliest bridgelaying tanks. Inglis retired from the army on 9 March 1919, having been rewarded for his military service with an appointment as an Officer of the Order of the British Empire.

== Return to King's College ==
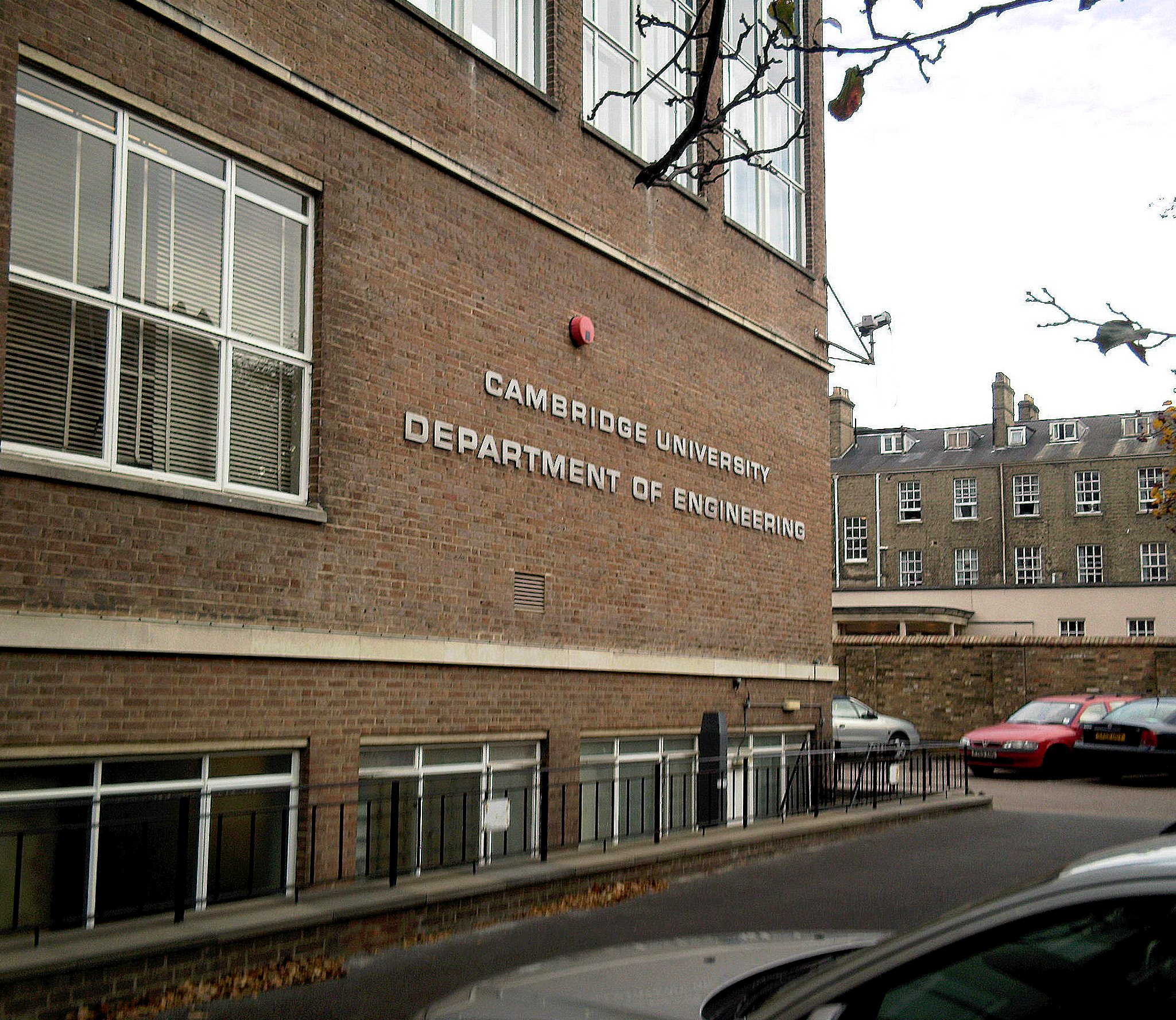
The modern Cambridge University Engineering Department is sited on the former Scroope House, acquired for the university by Inglis in 1924.

Inglis returned to Cambridge in 1918 and was appointed as the professor of Mechanism and Applied Mechanics (renamed Mechanical Sciences in 1934). On 25 March 1919, he was selected to head the Cambridge University Engineering Department as the successor of Hopkinson, who had died in an air crash the previous year. Though he made no radical changes, such as had occurred under his predecessors, under Inglis's supervision the department became the largest in the university and one of the best engineering schools in the world. He was responsible for expanding the department to meet the increased post-war demand for engineers and for the move from its traditional home at Free School Lane. Inglis acquired the 4-acre (1.6 ha) Scroope House on Trumpington Street for the department and constructed a 50,000-square-foot (4,600 m^{2}) laboratory on the site by 1923, followed in 1931 by a structure containing lecture theatres and a drawing office.

At Cambridge Inglis's students included Sir Frank Whittle (developer of the jet engine), James N. Goodier (mechanical engineer and academic), Sir Morien Morgan (called the "Father of Concorde") and Beryl Platt, Baroness Platt (Conservative peer). He was also in contact with Russian railway engineer Yury Lomonosov and lectured to biochemist Albert Chibnall. Despite mentoring some of the best engineers of their generation Inglis was realistic about the actual intentions of many of his students at the time. He once told a new intake class: "Your fathers, gentlemen, have sent you to Cambridge to be educated, not to become engineers. They think, however, that reading engineering is a very good way of becoming educated. In 10 years' time, however, 90% of you will have become managers, whether of design, manufacturing, sales, research or even accounts departments in industry. The remaining 10% of you will have become successful lawyers, novelists, and things of that sort". Undeterred, Inglis sought to give his students the broadest possible engineering education, covering all fields to prevent them becoming "cramped by premature specialisation".

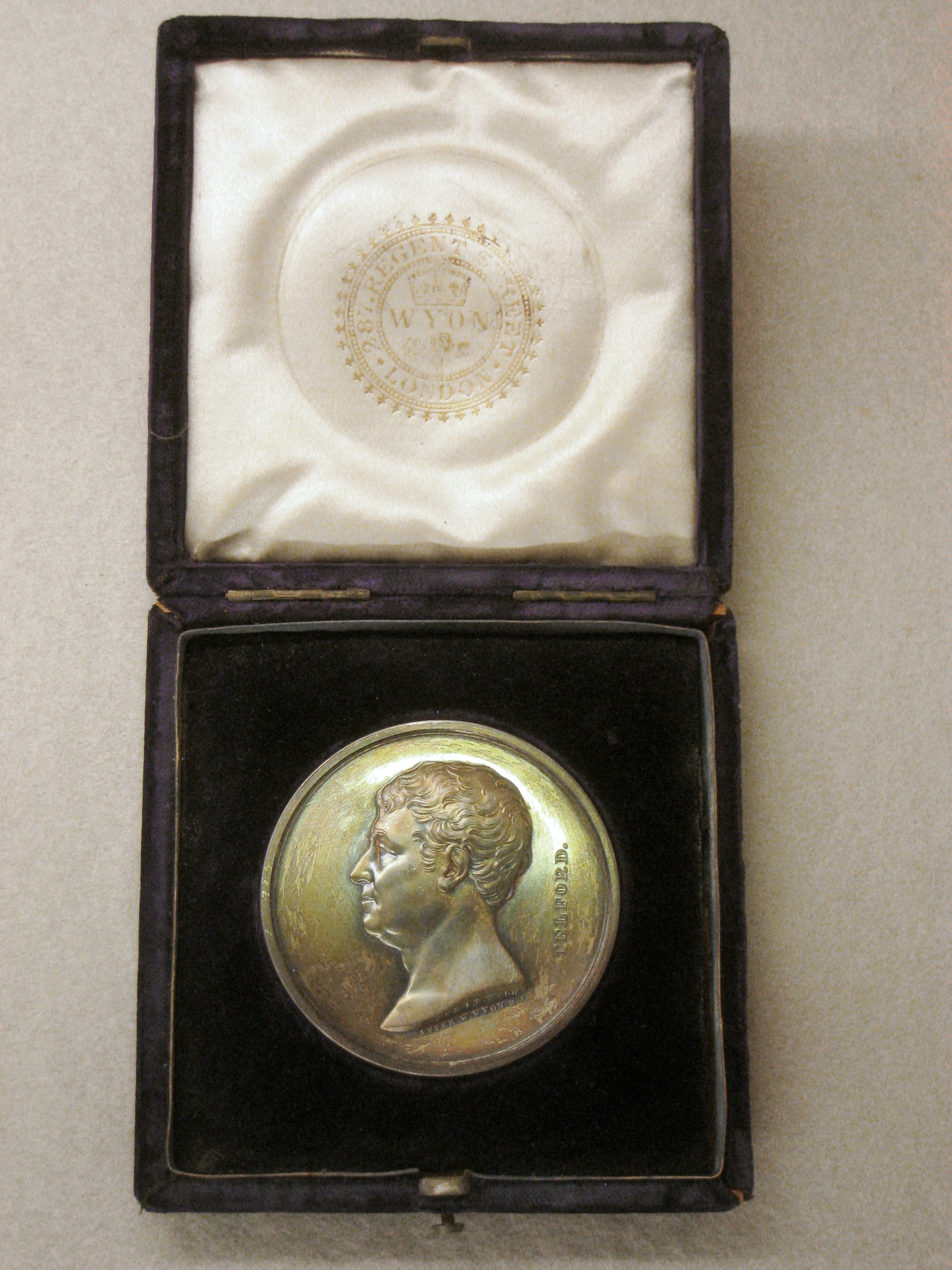
Telford Medal of the Institution of Civil Engineers like that awarded to Inglis in 1924

Inglis had close contacts with industry and was able to establish a professorship in aeronautical engineering and links with a nearby Air Ministry experimental flight station. He was also successful in arranging with the War Office for Royal Engineers officers to study the Engineering Tripos at the university. The university drew praise for the quality of its teaching during Inglis's tenure, though his department has been criticised for its "comparative neglect of original research". From 1923, he was involved with the analysis of vibration and its effects on railway bridges, including a period spent working with Christopher Hinton during the latter's final year as a student at Cambridge. Inglis was appointed to a sub-committee of the British government's Department of Scientific and Industrial Research Bridge Stress Committee by Ewing, who was chairman, and became responsible for almost all of the mathematics of the investigation. Inglis derived a theory that allowed for the accurate assessment of the vibrations caused by hammer blow force imparted to the bridge by locomotives, and the committee's 1928 report included recommendations that the hammer blow force be included in bridge design calculations in the future. During the course of this work Inglis was able to show that the increased oscillation of bridges at train speeds beyond those that corresponded with the natural frequency of the bridge was due to the influence of the locomotive's suspension – the first time that this phenomenon had been explained. Inglis's work on bridge vibration has been described as his most important post-war research. He followed up the work by using a harmonic series and Macaulay's method to approximate the vibration of beams of non-uniform mass distribution or bending modulus. This work is related to the later method used by Myklestad and Prohl in the field of rotordynamics.

Inglis was elected an Institution of Civil Engineers member in 1923 and became a member of its council in 1928. He was very active professionally and also served on the councils of the Institution of Naval Architects, Institution of Structural Engineers and the Institution of Waterworks Engineers; he was an Institution of Mechanical Engineers honorary member. Inglis was also a prolific writer, publishing 25 books and academic papers on a wide range of engineering topics. He received the ICE's Telford Medal in 1924 for a paper entitled The Theory of Transverse Oscillations in Girders and its Relation to Live Load and Impact Allowance. In 1926, he was appointed to a Royal Commission considering cross-river traffic in London with particular reference to the Waterloo and St Paul's bridges. Inglis founded the Cambridge Engineers' Association to promote social activities at the University, and saw Sir Charles Parsons appointed as its first president in 1929. In the same year, he was awarded the honorary degree of Doctor of Laws by the University of Edinburgh.

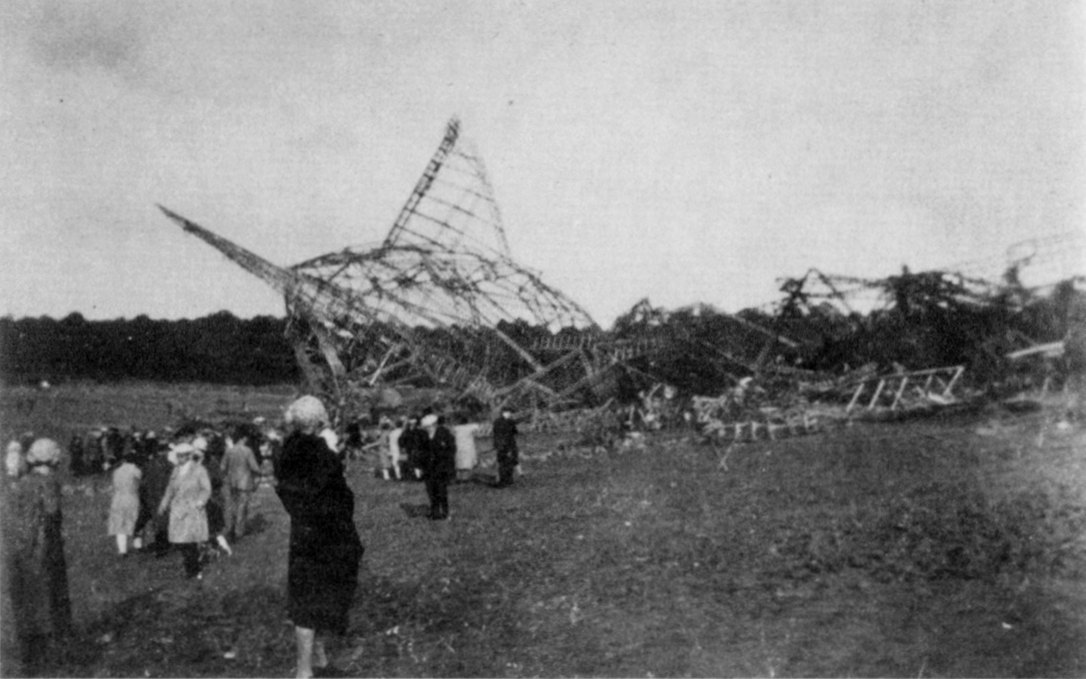
Wreckage of the airship R101, the loss of which was investigated by Inglis in 1930

In 1930 Inglis was appointed to the board of inquiry looking into the crash of the airship R101, and in the same year was made a Fellow of the Royal Society. He was a member of the London, Midland and Scottish Railway's Advisory Committee on Scientific Research from 1931 to 1947 and conducted numerous experiments on their behalf in the laboratories at Cambridge. He was able to prove the factors behind hunting oscillation, a violent oscillation of railway carriages, and developed testing equipment to approximate the wear of rail track and wheels in the field.

Inglis published the book A Mathematical Treatise on Vibrations in Railway Bridges in 1934, which was described by a reviewer as "a valuable asset for both the mathematician and engineer", and also submitted several papers on the matter to the Institution of Civil Engineers (ICE). Inglis delivered the Trevithick Memorial Lecture for the ICE in 1933, and was elected British Waterworks Association president in 1935. At around this time, he was appointed to the governing council of Cheltenham College, of which he remained a member for the rest of his life. Inglis was the president of the 1934 International Congress on Theoretical and Applied Mechanics held at Cambridge, one of the series of Congresses that gave rise to the IUTAM. He was a proposer for the Royal Society fellowship of Andrew Robertson, the mechanical engineer, in 1936.

== Second World War and after ==
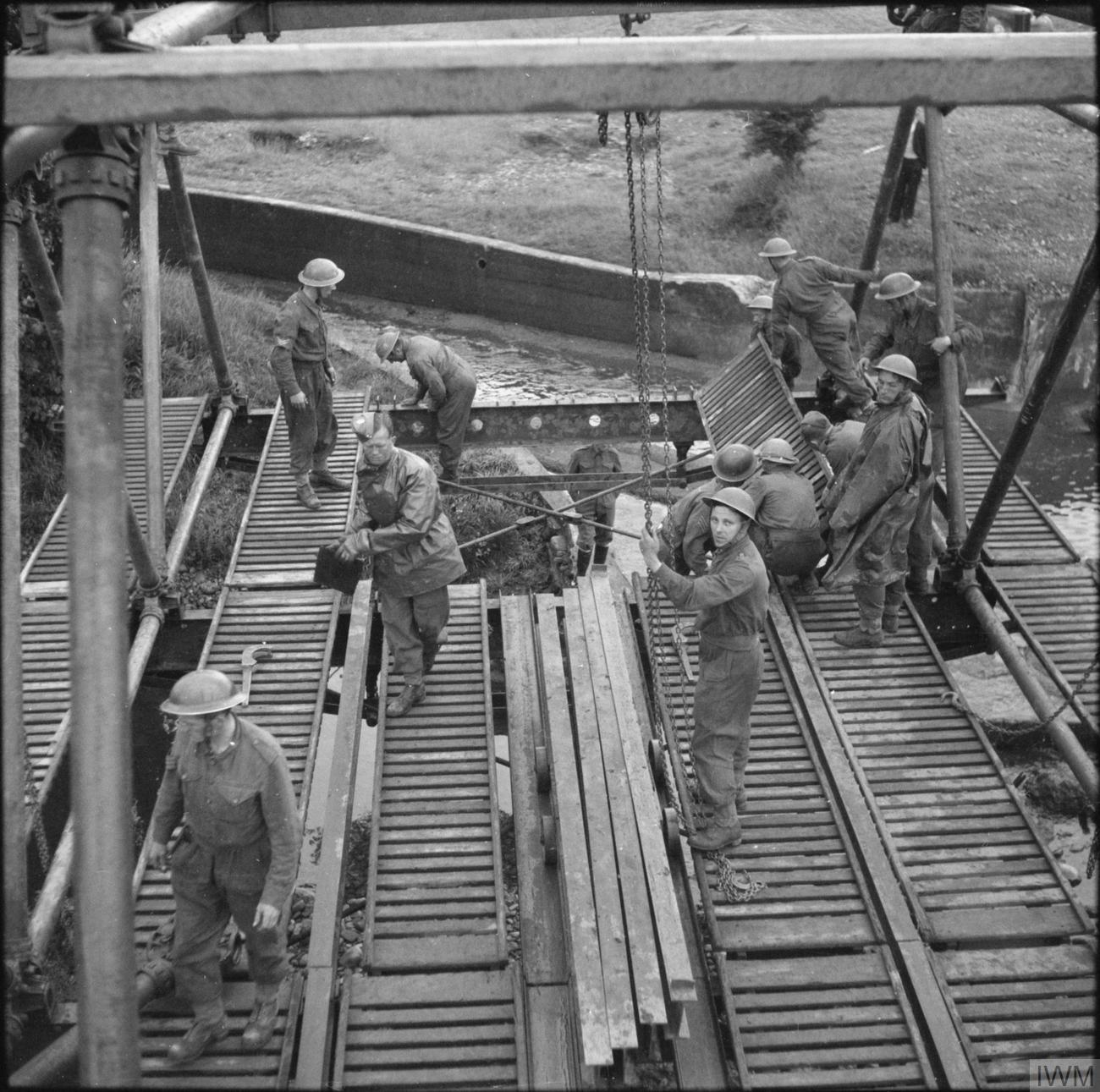
A Mark III Inglis Bridge under construction in 1943

Inglis was due to retire from the university in 1940, but was persuaded to remain for another three years so that John Baker could be appointed in his stead. Interest in Inglis's army bridge was rekindled in the Second World War and the Mark III design introduced in 1940. Inglis applied for a United States patent for the particular type of triangular trusses used in his bridge in 1940; which was approved and granted in 1943. Testing of a prototype of the Mark III revealed a weakness in the top chord of the truss and the subsequent redesign complicated the production process. Whilst the bridge was produced in limited quantities from 1940 it was largely replaced by the Bailey bridge, introduced in 1941, a fact that disappointed Inglis. The Inglis design remained in service for some time owing to a lack of resources for production of the Bailey bridge and saw service in rear areas and with the 1st Canadian Infantry Division.

Inglis was elected as ICE president for the 1941–42 session, having been vice-president in 1938, and gave an inaugural address on the education of engineers that was judged to be one of the best ever given. In his address, he stated that "the soul and spirit of education is that habit of mind which remains when a student has completely forgotten everything he has ever been taught", a quote which has since been used by several organisations to describe the importance of an engineering education. He delivered the Thomas Hawksley Lecture on "Gyroscopic Principles and Applications" for the Institution of Mechanical Engineers in 1943 and the fiftieth ICE James Forrest lecture on "Mechanical Vibrations, their Cause and Prevention" in 1944, being awarded the ICE's Charles Parsons medal the same year. He gave the Parsons Memorial Lecture to the North-East Coast Institution of Engineers and Shipbuilders in 1945 in which he presented his Basic Function Method, an alternative to the use of Fourier series for the analysis of vibrations in beams.

After his retirement as department head Inglis served as Vice-Provost of King's College from 1943 to 1947. He received a knighthood in the 1945 King's Birthday Honours, and in 1946 was appointed as chair of the committee charged with advising the Minister of War Transport on railway modernisation. Inglis continued to develop his theories on teaching engineering and wrote in the Proceedings of the Institution of Mechanical Engineers in 1947 on the teaching of engineering mathematics: "Mathematics [required by engineers] though it must be sound and incisive as far as goes, need not be of that artistic and exalted quality which calls for the mentality of the real mathematician. It can be termed mathematics of the tin-opening variety, and in contrast to real mathematicians, engineers are more interested in the contents of the tin than in the elegance of the tin-opener employed". He published the textbook Applied Mechanics for Engineers in 1951, following which he spent three months as a visiting professor at the University of the Witwatersrand in South Africa. His wife, Lady Eleanor Inglis, died on 1 April 1952, and Charles died eighteen days later at Southwold, Suffolk. The Cambridge University Engineering Department's Inglis Building is named in his honour. Inglis has been described as the greatest teacher of engineering of his time.

== Bibliography ==
- Anonymous (1952). "Obituary. Professor Sir Charles Edward Inglis, O.B.E., 1875–1952. (Past President and Vice-President)". Proceedings of the Institution of Civil Engineers. 1 (4): 502–3. doi:10.1680/iicep.1952.26967.
- Atkins, Tony (2009). The Science and Engineering of Cutting: The Mechanics and Processes of Separating and Puncturing Biomaterials, Metals and Non-metals. Oxford: Butterworth-Heinemann. ISBN 978-0-7506-8531-3.
- Ashbee, K.H.G. (2008). "On the Propensity of Laminates to Delaminate". Journal of Materials Science. 43 (20): 6599–6603. Bibcode:2008JMatS..43.6599A. doi:10.1007/s10853-008-2628-8. S2CID 136925099.
- Baker, J.F. (1953). "Charles Edward Inglis. 1875–1952". Obituary Notices of Fellows of the Royal Society. 8 (22): 444–457. doi:10.1098/rsbm.1953.0010. S2CID 161226001.
- Baker, J.F. (2004). "Inglis, Sir Charles Edward (1875–1952)". Oxford Dictionary of National Biography. Revised by Jacques Heyman (online ed.). Oxford University Press. doi:10.1093/ref:odnb/34100. (Subscription, Wikipedia Library access or UK public library membership required.)
- Broadbent, E. G. (November 1980). "Morien Bedford Morgan. 20 December 1912 – 4 April 1978". Biographical Memoirs of Fellows of the Royal Society. 26: 371–410. doi:10.1098/rsbm.1980.0012. JSTOR 769789. S2CID 73018654.
- Chibnell, A. C. (July 1966). "The Road to Cambridge". Annual Review of Biochemistry. 35: 1–24. doi:10.1146/annurev.bi.35.070166.000245. PMID 5328354.
- Cosgrove, Tom; Phillips, Declan; Quilligan, Michael (2010). Educating Engineers as if They Were Human (PDF). International Symposium for Engineering Education. Cork, Ireland: University College Cork.
- Divall, Colin (1990). "A Measure of Agreement: Employers and Engineering Studies in the Universities of England and Wales, 1897–1939". Social Studies of Science. 20 (65): 65–112. doi:10.1177/030631290020001003. S2CID 109716911.
- Fletcher, David (2011). Mark V Tank. Oxford: Osprey Publishing. ISBN 978-1-84908-351-5.
- Forfar, D. O. (1996). "What became of the Senior Wranglers?" (PDF). Mathematical Spectrum. 29 (1). Archived (PDF) from the original on 4 March 2016.
- Heywood, Anthony (2011). Engineer of Revolutionary Russia: Iurii V. Lomonosov (1876–1952) and the Railways. Farnham, Surrey: Ashgate Publishing. ISBN 978-0-7546-5539-8.
- Holmes, Patrick (1997). "Future Directions in International Science Education". Frontiers: The Interdisciplinary Journal of Study Abroad. 3 (22): 233–239. doi:10.36366/frontiers.v3i1.58. Archived from the original on 21 November 2008.
- Joiner, Colonel John Herbert (May 2011). "The Story of the Bailey Bridge". Proceedings of the Institution of Civil Engineers. Engineering History and Heritage. 164 (EH2): 65–72. doi:10.1680/ehah.10.00002.
- Matheson, J. A. L. (March 1963). "The Impact of Technology on Public Administration". Australian Journal of Public Administration. 22 (1): 19–25. doi:10.1111/j.1467-8500.1963.tb02144.x.
- Moullin, E. B. (31 May 1952). "Obituary — Sir Charles Inglis, O.B.E., F.R.S" (PDF). Nature. 169 (4309): 906–908. Bibcode:1952Natur.169..906M. doi:10.1038/169906a0. S2CID 4295909.
- Peskin, L. C. (1935). "Review: C. E. Inglis, A Mathematical Treatise on Vibrations in Railway Bridges". Bulletin of the American Mathematical Society. 41 (5): 315. doi:10.1090/S0002-9904-1935-06087-2.
- Rawling, Bill (1985). "Crossing the Gap: The 1st Canadian Division Engineers and Bridge Construction 1939–1945". Scientia Canadensis: Canadian Journal of the History of Science, Technology and Medicine. 2. 9 (29): 114. doi:10.7202/800213ar.
- Sanderson, Michael (May 1969). "The Universities and Industry in England 1919–1939". Bulletin of Economic Research. 21 (1): 39–65. doi:10.1111/j.1467-8586.1969.tb00081.x.
- Taplin, D. M. R.; Saxina, Ashok (2011). "ICF: The World Academy of Structural Integrity – retrospective and prospective". Strength, Fracture and Complexity. 7 (2): 109–121. doi:10.3233/SFC-2011-0130.
- Thierry, John A (March 1946). "The Bailey Bridge" (PDF). The Military Engineer. 38 (245): 96–102. Archived (PDF) from the original on 5 April 2015.
- Venn; Venn (1922–1958). "Inglis, Charles Edward (INGS894CE)". A Cambridge Alumni Database. University of Cambridge.
- Watson, Garth (1988). The Civils. London: Thomas Telford. ISBN 978-0-7277-0392-7.
- Welbourn, D. B.; Dixon, R. (19 April 1973). "Supply and demand". Electronics and Power. 19 (7): 149–150. doi:10.1049/ep.1973.0195.
- de With, Gijsbertus (2006). Structure, Deformation, and Integrity of Materials. Wiley-VCH. ISBN 978-3-527-31426-3.

Professional and academic associations
| Preceded by Leopold Halliday Savile | President of the Institution of Civil Engineers; November 1941 – November 1942 | Succeeded by John Edward Thornycroft |
