= St James House, Monmouth =

Building in Monmouth, Monmouthshire, Wales

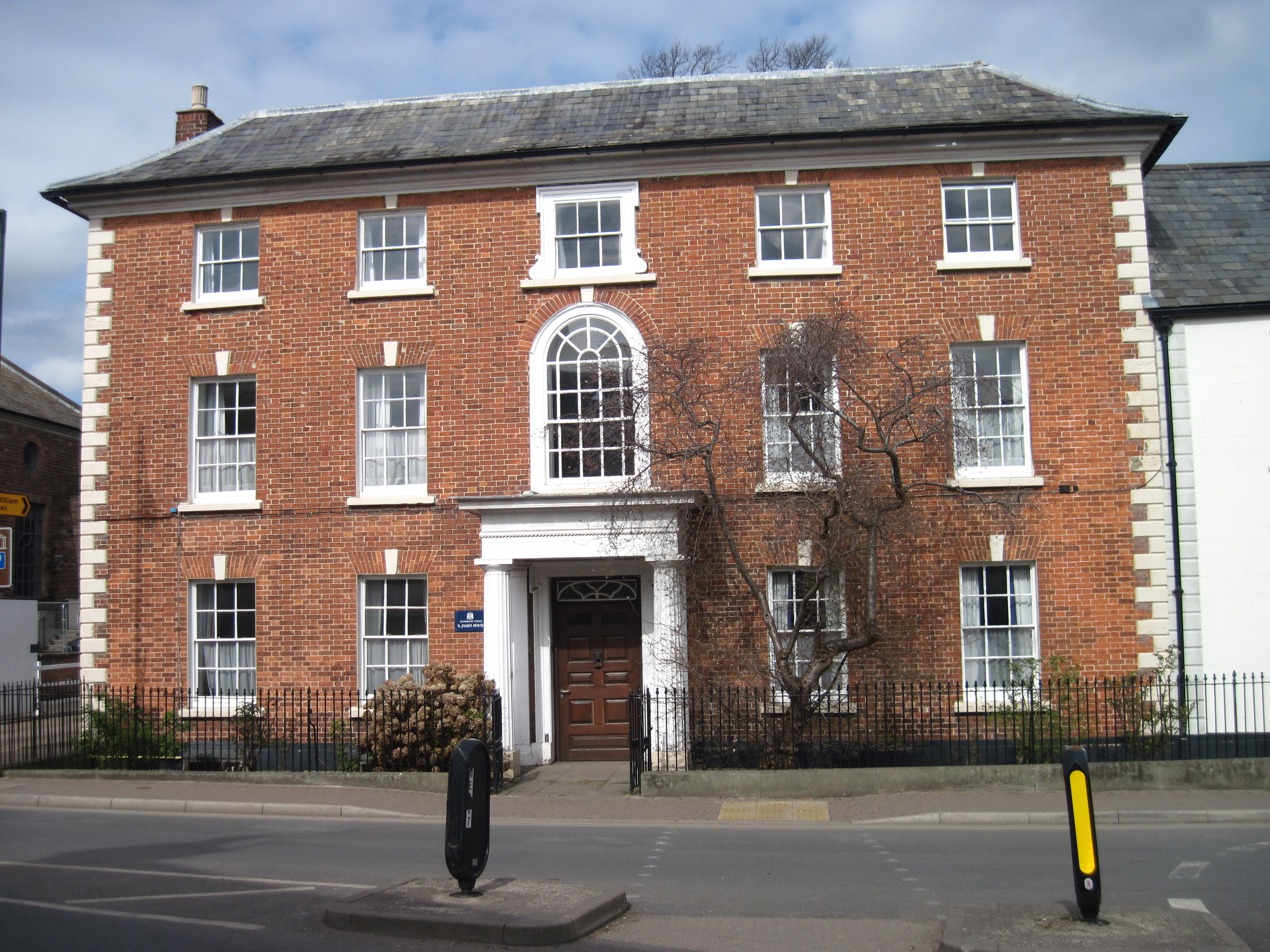
- St James House at St James Square and Whitecross Street
- Interactive map of the St James House, Monmouth area

General information
- Location: 10 St James Square; 10 Whitecross Street, Monmouth, Wales
- Coordinates: 51.813235°N 2.711477°W

Design and construction
- Designations: Grade II Listed

St James House is a grade II listed building in Monmouth, Monmouthshire, Wales. It is in the historic St James Square neighbourhood, within the medieval town walls. While the house currently has an attractive, 18th-century facade, it originated as a burgage tenement. In addition, behind the house, evidence of a kiln has been unearthed, with both Medieval and Post-medieval pottery. In 2010, archaeological excavation in the square revealed the first evidence of Mesolithic human settlement in Monmouth. Recent residents of St James House have included boarding students from Monmouth School.

== Neighbourhood and location ==
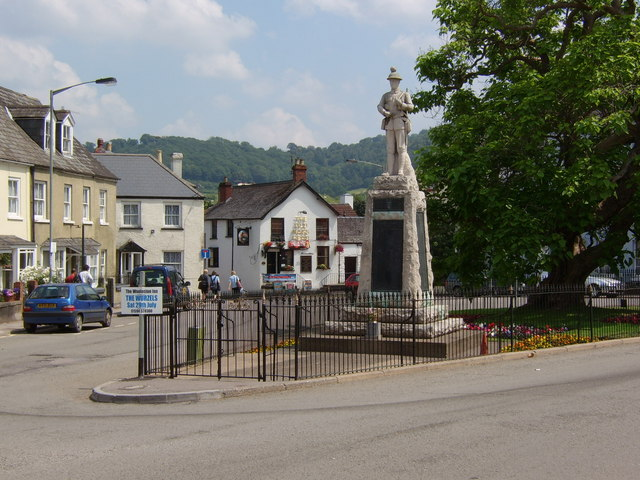
View from south-west side of St James Square with Monmouth War Memorial, installed 1921, and Indian Bean Tree, planted c. 1900 and the Old Nag's Head beyond.

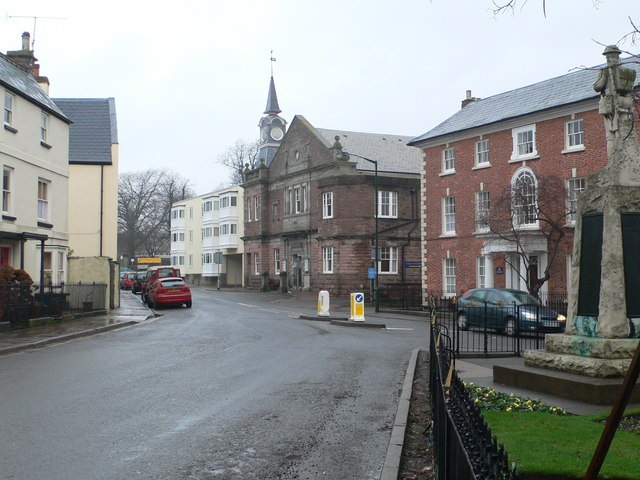
33 Whitecross Street (far left), St James House (right), and Public Library (centre)

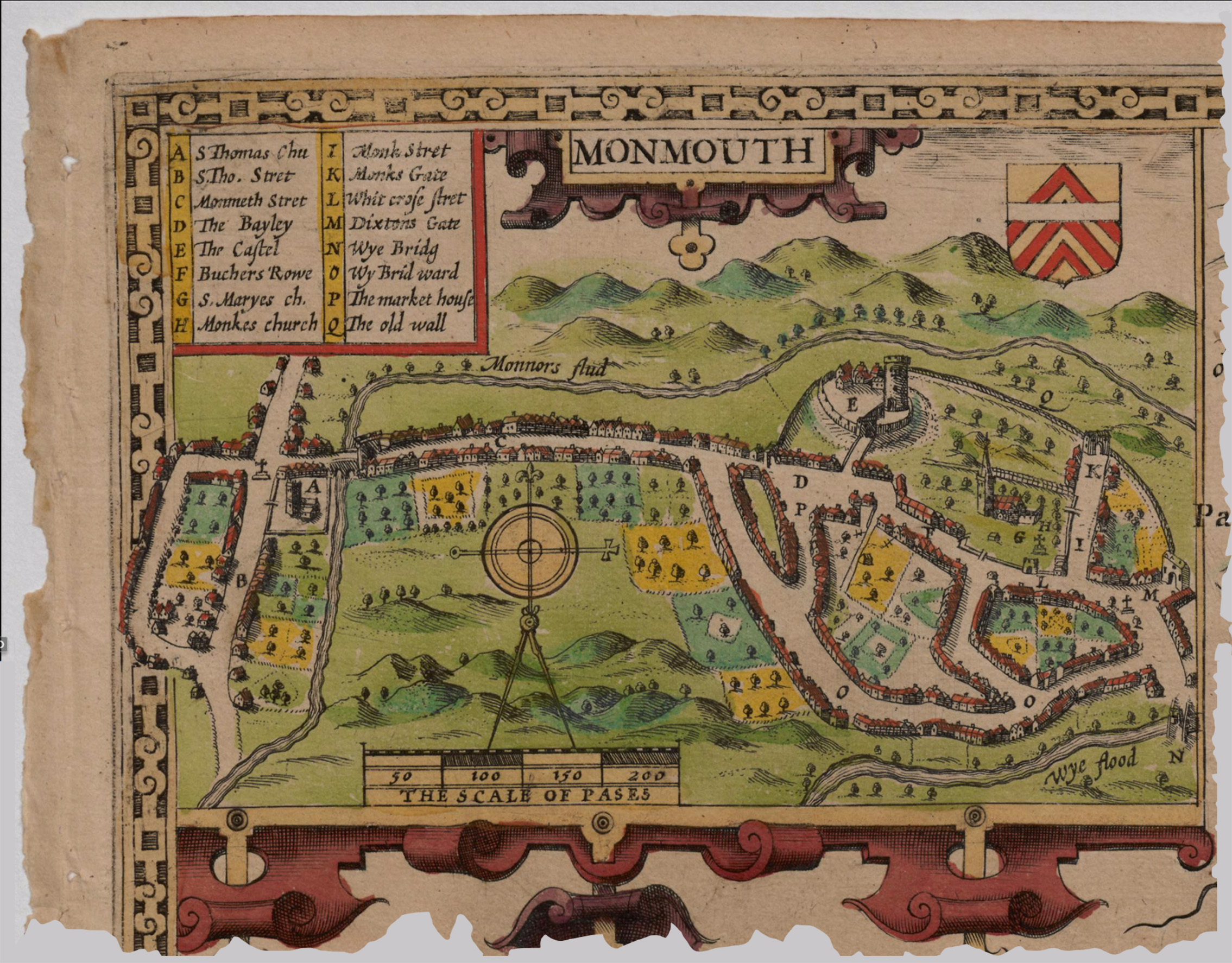
1610 map of Monmouth by John Speed with East Gate (Dixton Gate) marked M, and cross

"There are some lovely spots in the town centre, none prettier than St James's Square, with its old war memorial in the shadow of a romantic-looking tree." This is the description of St James Square (pictured) in Monmouth, Wales that appeared in The Telegraph of 25 February 2006. The war memorial mentioned is the Monmouth War Memorial that was installed in the square in 1921 and was the work of sculptor W. Clarke of Llandaff. The "romantic-looking tree" is a reference to the Catalpa or Indian Bean Tree that was planted on the square in about 1900.

St James House (pictured) is located at the eastern end of Whitecross Street, where it terminates at the roundabout encircling the triangular St James Square. The building is positioned on the north side of the square, across from 33 Whitecross Street (pictured), the site of archaeological excavation in 2009. St James House lies within the medieval town walls which were built around 1300. On the 1610 map of Monmouth (pictured below) by cartographer John Speed, the area which served as the site for St James House is depicted adjacent to the label for the East Gate (Dixton Gate). However, as discussed by author William Meyler Warlow, the square, as well as the road south of it, including the future St James Street and Almshouse Street, were all considered to be part of Whitecross Street during the early 17th century. A white cross, which gave its name to the street, stood in the square (see map). As is the case with some other houses on the eastern leg of Whitecross Street, St. James House has had two addresses: 10 St James Square and 10 Whitecross Street.

== Design and burgage history ==
St James House was grade II listed on 27 June 1952. The listed building has an 18th-century facade with a three-storey, five-bay elevation. The exterior is red brick, highlighted by light-colored, raised stone quoins which serve as the cornerstones of the walls, contrasting with the brick. Decorative keystones of similar material are atop all of the windows except one, which is lugged and scrolled. The bays on the ground and first floors are rectangular, while those on the uppermost floor are square. The exception is the tall, centre window on the first floor which is round-headed. The centrally-positioned entrance features a wood portico supported by Doric columns. A fanlight is present above the door. The roof is flared and hipped. The interior has a small amount of 17th-century plasterwork.

St James House is considered to be a good representation of the burgage tenements that were common during medieval times (link to glossary below). Its origins as a burgage are most evident at the rear of the property. The current, 18th-century facade was a later addition. Burgage tenements were rental properties that were often long and narrow plots of land, particularly in towns where frontage property along a street was at a premium. The gable (narrow) end of a house on a burgage plot usually faced the street. While the classical style was in vogue during the 18th century, many burgage houses received new brick facades. Such was the case with St James House.

== Archaeology ==
Important archaeological finds have been excavated both at St James House and its neighbourhood. Behind St James House, evidence of a Post-medieval pottery kiln has been unearthed. The kiln at St. James House produced Welsh Borderland ceramics of the A7d type. Other Monmouthshire 17th-century kilns which produced this pottery included Abergavenny and Trefaldu at Cwmcarvan. A few sources of A7d pottery have been located outside of Monmouthshire as well, including Herefordshire. In addition, a base sherd of Spanish ware excavated by Socket in 1956 at St James House was found to be Medieval, of the early 15th century.

On 8 November 2010, the BBC News reported that during the course of gas main replacement work at St James Square and Wyebridge Street, Mesolithic era artefacts, including flints, were excavated (link to photograph of flints below). An article by Sion Morgan of the Western Mail which also ran on 8 Nov 2010 in Wales Online suggested that similar artefacts were found in St James Street as well. This represented the first discovery of Mesolithic human settlement in Monmouth.

== Residents of St James House ==
In 1891, Chippenham House, a grade II listed building at 102 Monnow Street, was home to surgeon Thomas Gilbert Prosser (1856–1932), a native of Monmouth. However, the doctor lived at St James House on Whitecross Street in 1901 and 1911. In Kelly's Directory of Monmouthshire 1901, Part 2, he is listed as both a county and borough magistrate. In Part 3 of the directory, he is listed as a medical officer at the Hospital & Dispensary. Prosser, a member of the Royal College of Surgeons, died on 5 Nov 1932 in Monmouth.

William Humphrey Williams (1880–1948), licensed by the Royal College of Physicians and a member of the Royal College of Surgeons, followed in the footsteps of Prosser, with regard to both profession and residence. He passed his Anatomy and Physiology examinations of the Royal College of Physicians and Surgeons in July 1903 and, by 1911, he was living at Chippenham House. The following year, on 26 September 1912, he married Nesta Faith Green-Price, daughter of Sir Richard Dansey Green-Price and granddaughter of Sir Richard Green-Price, in Radnorshire. By 1923, Williams was the Medical Officer of Health for Monmouth and the Williams family resided at St James House. The physician was also medical officer for the Rockfield district and public vaccinator for the Monmouth district. In addition, Williams was medical officer for the Borough Fever Hospital. Williams and his wife lived at St James House prior to Williams' death on 2 March 1948 in Monmouth.

Later, St James House served as a junior boarding house for boys ages ten to thirteen at Monmouth School. A J Jones was a housemaster at the St James House location. The Heart Project, a substantial renovation of Monmouth School, was undertaken in early 2011. As part of the first phase of that project, St James House was sold and its boarders were transferred to Chapel House, on the northern segment of Monk Street, in September 2011. The first phase also included redevelopment of The Grange from a prep school to a sixth form boarding house, which also opened in September 2011. The second phase of the school building project has begun.

== See also ==
- Monmouth School
- St James Square, Monmouth
- Whitecross Street, Monmouth
- Monmouth in the Mesolithic period
- Monmouth Town Walls and Defences
