= 33 Whitecross Street, Monmouth =

Listed building in Monmouth, Monmouthshire, Wales

33 Whitecross Street
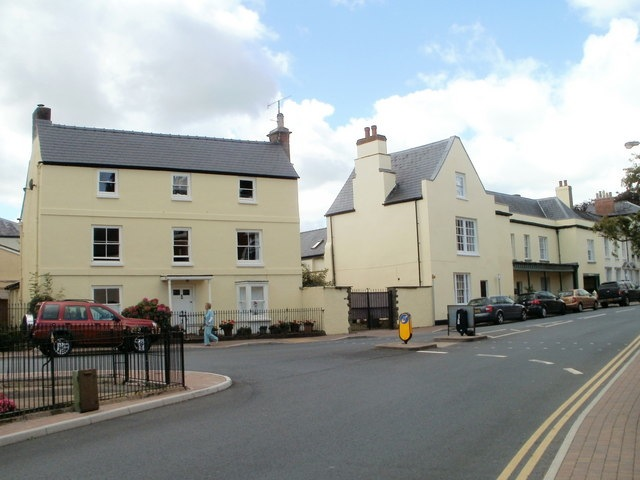
- 33 Whitecross Street, to left, at southwest side of St James Square
- Location in Monmouth
- Alternative names: 33 St James Square

General information
- Status: Grade II listed
- Location: Whitecross Street at St James Square, Monmouth, Monmouthshire, Wales
- Coordinates: 51.8130°N 2.7115°W

33 Whitecross Street is a grade II listed building in Monmouth, Wales in the area of St James Square. The property was the site of an archaeological excavation in 2009, which found evidence of Neolithic (prehistoric), Roman, and Medieval activity. The following year, archaeological excavation in the square discovered the first evidence of Mesolithic human settlement in Monmouth.

== Neighbourhood ==
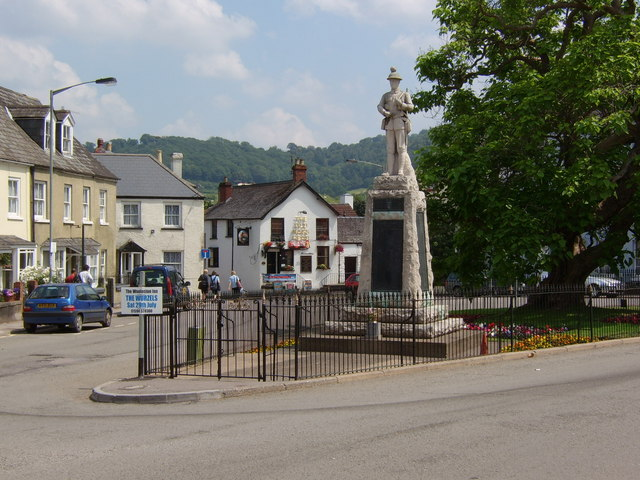
View from southwest side of St James Square with Monmouth War Memorial, installed 1921, and Indian Bean Tree, planted c.1900

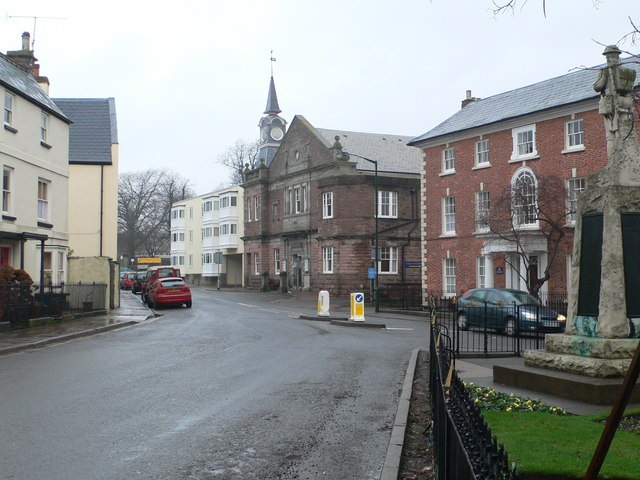
33 Whitecross Street (far left), St James House (right), and Public Library (centre)

"There are some lovely spots in the town centre, none prettier than St James's Square, with its old war memorial in the shadow of a romantic-looking tree." This is the description of St James Square (pictured) in Monmouth, Wales that appeared in The Telegraph of 25 February 2006. The Monmouth War Memorial that was installed in the square in 1921 was the work of sculptor W. Clarke of Llandaff. 33 Whitecross Street is located at the eastern end of Whitecross Street, where it terminates at the roundabout encircling the triangular St James Square. The record held by the Royal Commission on the Ancient and Historical Monuments of Wales gives the building an alternate address, 33 St James Square, on the west side of the square. The "romantic-looking tree" is a reference to the Catalpa or Indian Bean Tree which was planted on the square around 1900. The Catalpa, considered to be "one of the best examples of the species in Britain," became the focus of controversy in 2005 when the Monmouthshire County Council condemned the tree.

33 Whitecross Street (pictured) was grade II listed on 15 August 1974. The listed building is a three-storey house with a centrally positioned entrance. The porch has a six panelled door, with narrow cast iron columns flanking the entry. To the right of the entrance, there is a canted bay window from the turn of the 20th century. All of the windows on the three bay elevation are of plate glass, although those on the uppermost floor are smaller. The roof is of Welsh slate, and steeply pitched at the rear elevation which is two storeys. Two red brick chimneys are present. The painted, roughcast façade is remarkable for two band courses. The building was listed due to its "special architectural interest" and its location in a neighbourhood of other historic buildings. The dwelling is likely to have been constructed in the 18th century.

In January 2009, Monmouthshire County Council reported that approval had been granted for two new extensions to the back of 33 Whitecross Street. Notice was given that an archaeological watching brief would be required. That watching brief was undertaken by the firm of Monmouth Archaeology in July 2009. The subsequent report of the archaeological excavation was issued on 13 August 2009. The team of archaeologists that conducted the excavation included Stephen Clarke, Jane Bray, Dave Hancocks, and Colin Harris. The conclusion indicated that there was evidence of prehistoric (Neolithic), Roman, Medieval, and Post-Medieval activity at 33 Whitecross Street. The following year, in November 2010, the BBC News reported that a team of local archaeologists had discovered Mesolithic artefacts at St James Square and Wyebridge Street. The discovery was remarkable because it represented the first evidence of Mesolithic human settlement in Monmouth.

== See also ==
- Whitecross Street, Monmouth
- Monmouth in the Mesolithic period
- Monmouth Town Walls and Defences
