= Whitecross Street, Monmouth =

Street in Monmouth, Wales

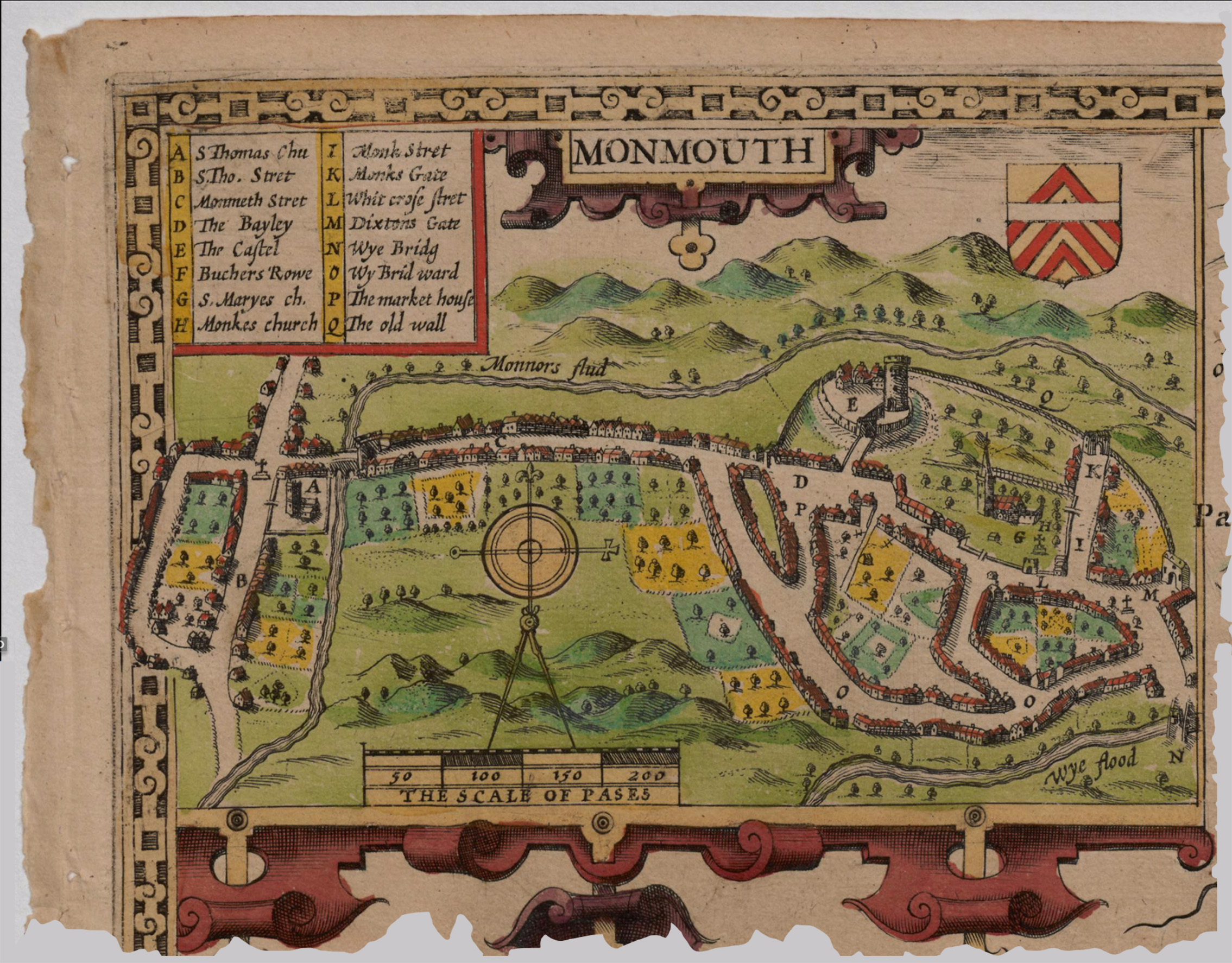
- John Speed's 1610 map of Monmouth, showing Whitecross Street (marked L)
- Interactive map of Whitecross Street, Monmouth
- Location: Monmouth, Wales
- Coordinates: 51.8131°N 2.7134°W
- East: St James Square
- West: Church Street

Whitecross Street is a historic street in the town centre of Monmouth, Monmouthshire, Wales. It was in existence by the 15th century, and appears as Whit crose on the 1610 map of the town by cartographer John Speed. It runs in an east-west direction, between Church Street and St James Square. It has been suggested that the street takes its name from a plague cross. Whitecross Street is lined with numerous listed buildings.

== History and location ==
Like several other streets in Monmouth, Whitecross Street is believed to have been laid out and named by the middle of the 15th century. It is located inside the medieval walls of the town, built around 1300. Most of the street's buildings were originally based on narrow burgage plots, with gable ends facing the street. St James House in Whitecross Street, though later rebuilt, is regarded as a particularly good example of the style.

On the map of Monmouth (pictured) engraved by John Speed in 1610, Whitecross Street (L on the map) is referred to as Whit crose. As discussed in a 2009 watching brief by the firm of Monmouth Archaeology, it has been assumed that the street was named after a white cross. Historically, such a cross was customarily a plague cross (link to example below). It is speculated that the cross in question might be the one drawn by Speed in the churchyard of St Mary's Priory Church on his 1610 map. However, according to local publisher and antiquary Charles Heath, writing in 1804, the stone cross after which the street was named was located on the site of a later public weighing machine, and its remains "were in existence in the memory of the present inhabitants."

Whitecross Street is the eastward extension of the now-pedestrianised Church Street. As it extends eastward and slightly to the north, the road intersects with Monk Street. Beyond the intersection, Whitecross Street continues to the east, dipping slightly to the south. It terminates at the roundabout encircling the triangular St James Square. The square is remarkable for an Indian Bean Tree (Catalpa), a native of the southeastern United States. St James Square also features the Monmouth War Memorial, designed by W. Clarke of Llandaff and installed in front of the Catalpa in 1921. On some modern-day maps, the eastern leg of Whitecross Street, from the intersection with Monk Street to its termination at the roundabout encircling St James Square, is also referred to as St James Square, such that some buildings in Whitecross Street have two addresses.

== Buildings ==
The Griffin (pictured below) at 1 Whitecross Street, is an 18th-century building which was grade II listed on 8 October 2005. Also referred to as The Griffin Inn, the public house is located at the corner of Whitecross Street and St Mary's Street, across from the gates of St Mary's Church. Originally The Old Griffin, it was rebuilt in the 1830s. A plaque with an image of a legendary creature, the griffin, is displayed on the facade of the building above the entrance (pictured). In addition, at the base of the pub, there is a rare hollowed sandstone gutter.

St Mary's Priory Church (pictured below) on Whitecross Street is a Grade II* listed building. It is one of 24 blue plaque buildings on the Monmouth Heritage Trail. The main surviving medieval component of the building is the 14th-century tower. The church was rebuilt in the 18th and 19th centuries.

5 Whitecross Street is a mid-19th-century house which is not included on the 1835 map of Monmouth by John Wood. The small, two-storey listed building has a painted exterior and a slate roof. Architectural details suggest that it was formerly a small shop.

Merrick House at 6 Whitecross Street is an 18th-century listed building. The three-storey house has five windows across and a slate roof.

Whitecross Street, recorded as numbers 3-11, is a listed dwelling, its record with the collection of the Royal Commission on the Ancient and Historical Monuments of Wales.

13 Whitecross Street is a 19th-century listed building. The two-storey building has two windows across and a stucco on brick exterior.

The Priory House (pictured below) at 15 Whitecross Street is an 18th-century grade II listed building. The three-storey building has a red tile roof. It currently serves as a private political club.

Whitecross House (link to photograph below) at 17 Whitecross Street is a mid-18th-century, three-storey house with five bays. The bed and breakfast is painted white with black trim and has a view of Monk Street. Whitecross House is a listed building.

The Hollies on Whitecross Street is an 18th-century, well-preserved Georgian house which was grade II listed in 1974. Also referred to as the Holly House, the three-storey, red brick building has a slate roof. Architectural details include a moulded cornice and parapet. The interior is remarkable for its staircase. The building was listed for its architectural interest, and is located immediately behind 17 Whitecross Street.

The Rolls Hall (pictured below) on Whitecross Street is a 19th-century Grade II listed building. It is one of 24 blue plaque buildings on the Monmouth Heritage Trail. Now the Public Library, it was built in 1887-8 of Old Red Sandstone and grey Forest of Dean ashlar. The building was a gift to the town of Monmouth by John Allan Rolls, the future Lord Llangattock.

23 and 25 Whitecross Street is a pair of 19th-century listed houses. Together, there are seven bays. It is a two-storey complex, although No 23 is three-storey in part.

The Judges' Lodgings at 27 Whitecross Street, just north of St James Square, is a grade II listed building. It is located opposite the public library, also known as Rolls Hall, and is one of 24 blue plaque buildings on the Monmouth Heritage Trail. The Judges' Lodgings has its origins in two adjacent 16th-century houses, which underwent extensive alterations in the 17th through 19th centuries. It was known previously as the Labour in Vain public house and Somerset House. It is also referred to as St James Garage and Mews. The three-storey, five-window section to the left has a red brick exterior. The two-storey, two window section to the right has a painted exterior.

St James House (pictured below) on Whitecross Street (the address also recorded at St James Square) is an 18th-century, three-storey listed building. There are five bays and the front, red brick facade is remarkable for a tall, arched window above the entrance. The building was part of Monmouth School and was used as a boarding house.

33 Whitecross Street (pictured below) at St James Square is a grade II listed building, most probably of the 18th century. While the front elevation is three storeys, the rear has a two-storey elevation. It was listed initially in 1974, and by Cadw in 2008, and was included due to its special architectural interest and its location amid other historic buildings.

== Gallery ==
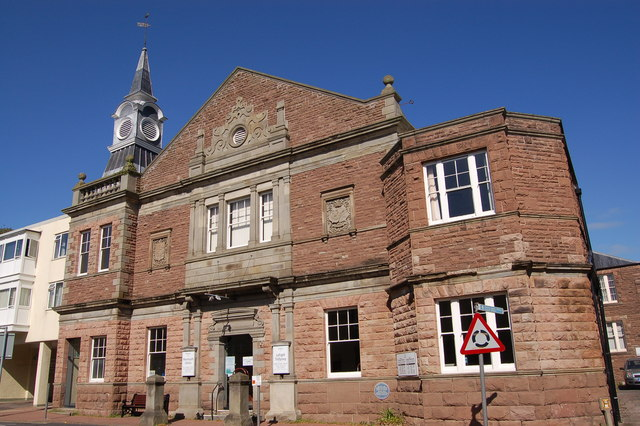
The Rolls Hall, now Library

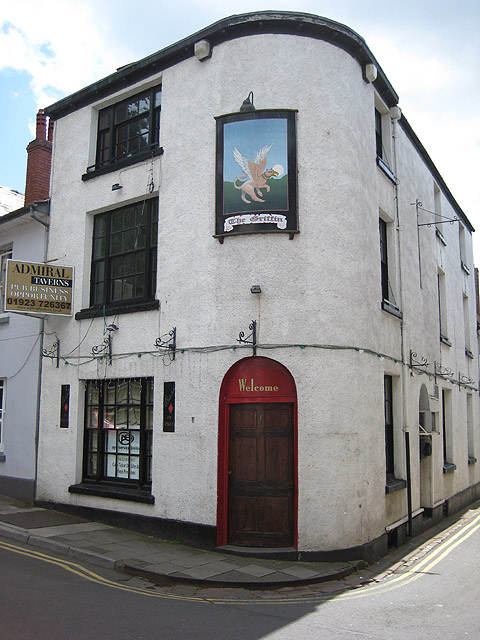
The Griffin, with plaque

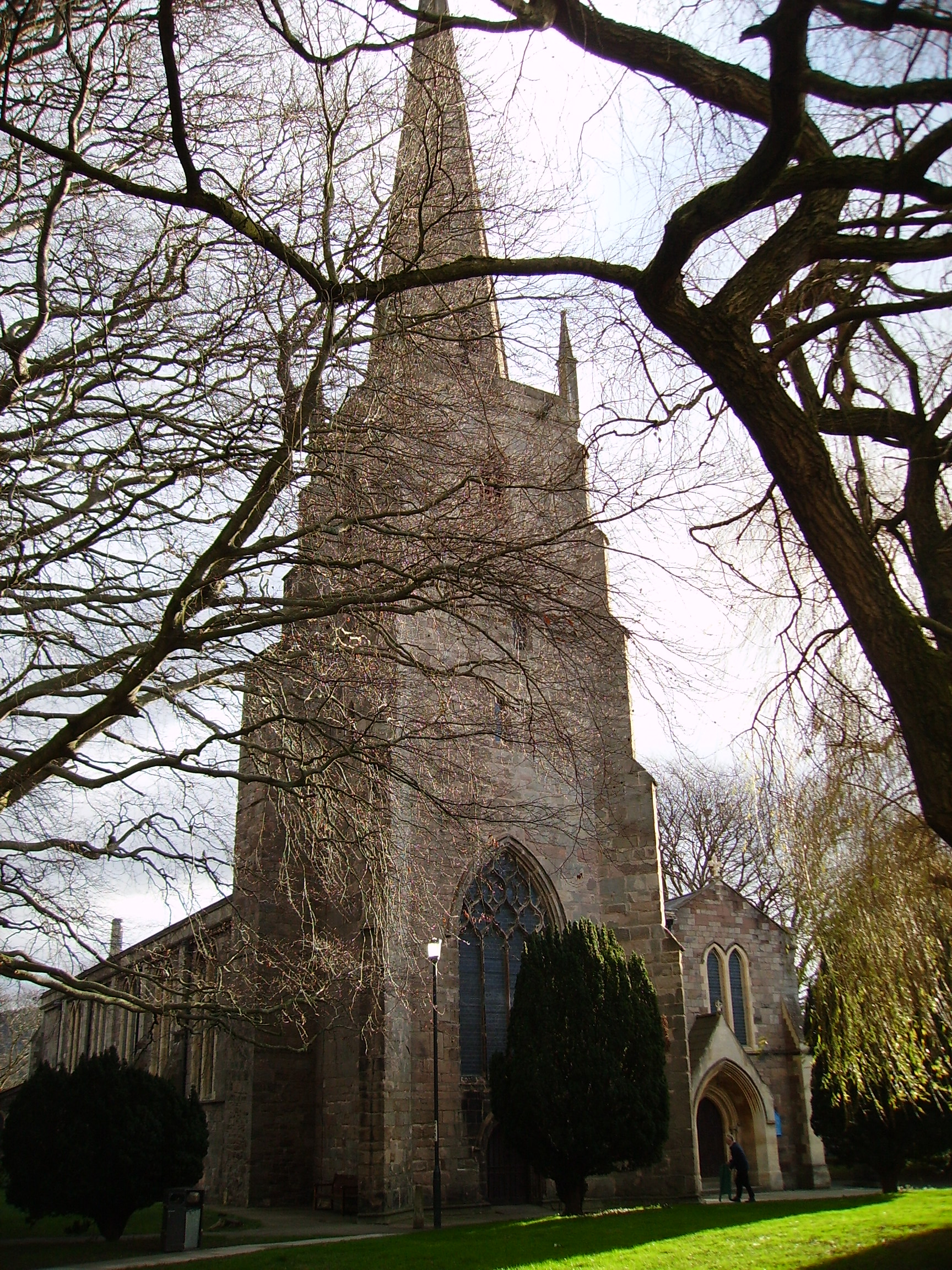
St Mary's Priory Church

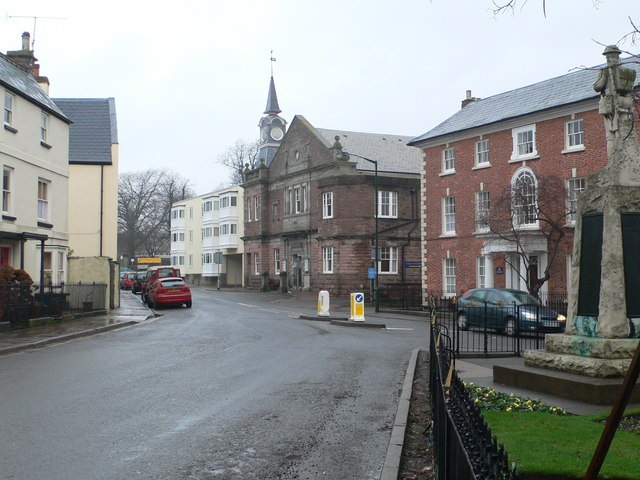
St James House

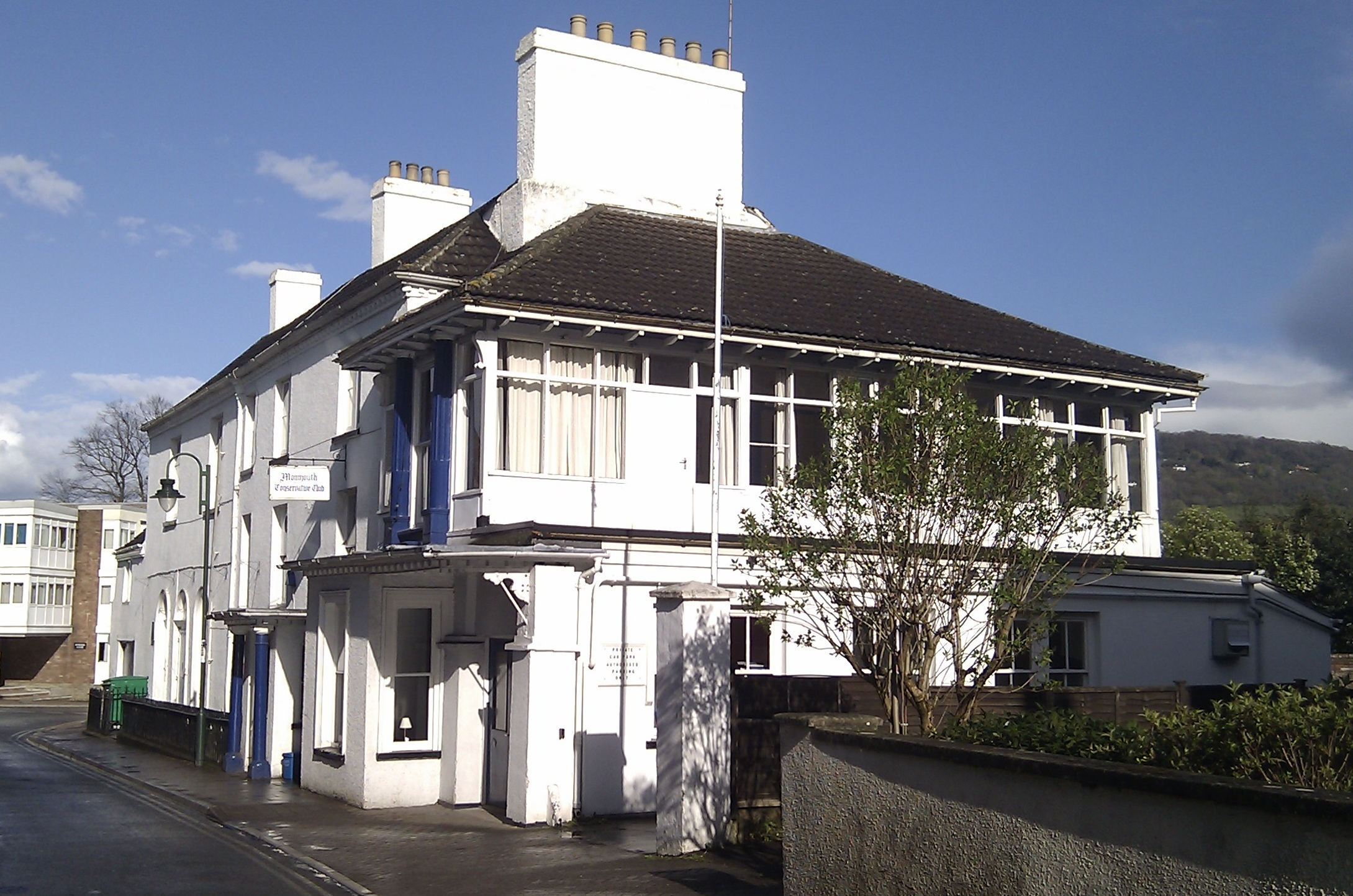
The Priory House

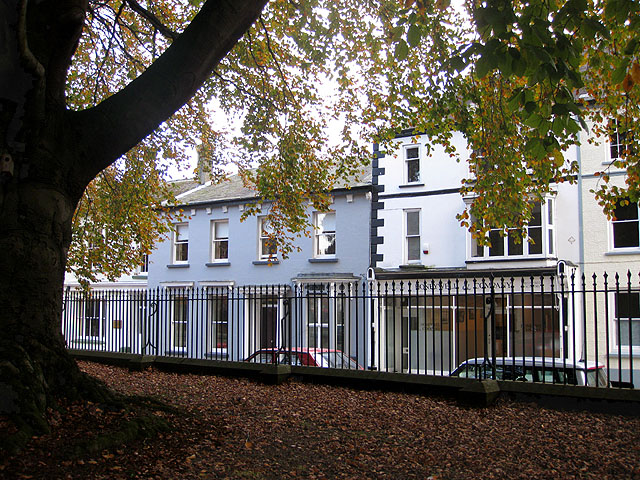
Offices on Whitecross St.

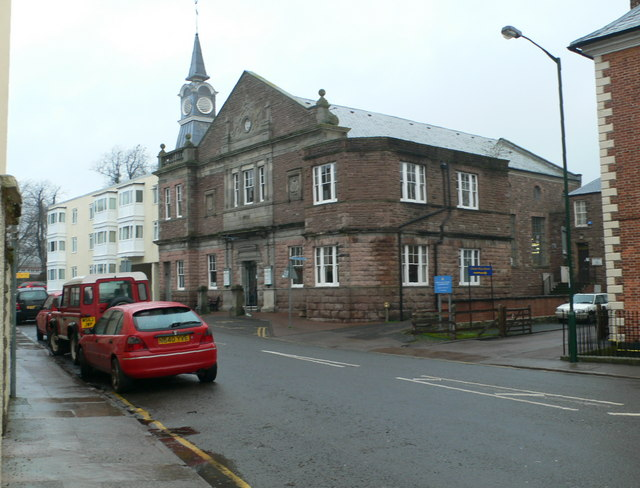
The Rolls Hall, now Library

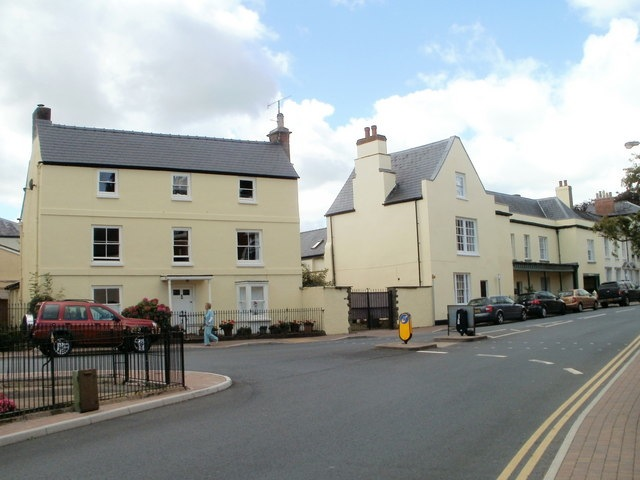
33 Whitecross Street, at left
