= St James Square, Monmouth =

Square in Monmouth, Wales

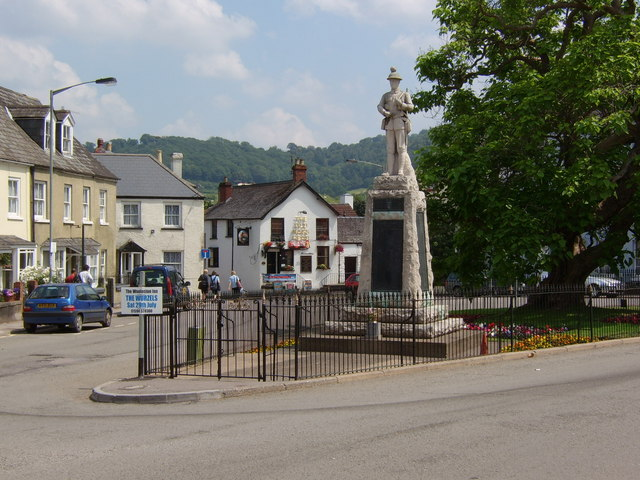
- St James Square with Monmouth War Memorial, Indian Bean Tree, and Old Nag's Head
- Interactive map of St James Square, Monmouth
- Location: Monmouth, Wales
- Coordinates: 51.8130°N 2.7111°W
- East: St James Street; Old Dixton Road
- West: Whitecross Street

St James Square is a historic square in the town centre of Monmouth, Monmouthshire, Wales. It is located at the eastern end of Whitecross Street, within the medieval town walls. The area features the Monmouth War Memorial and the controversial, historic Indian Bean Tree. In addition, in 2010, the square was the site of discovery of the first Mesolithic artefacts in Monmouth. St James Square is lined with numerous listed buildings. It is also home to the Monmouth Catalpa Tree.

== History and location ==
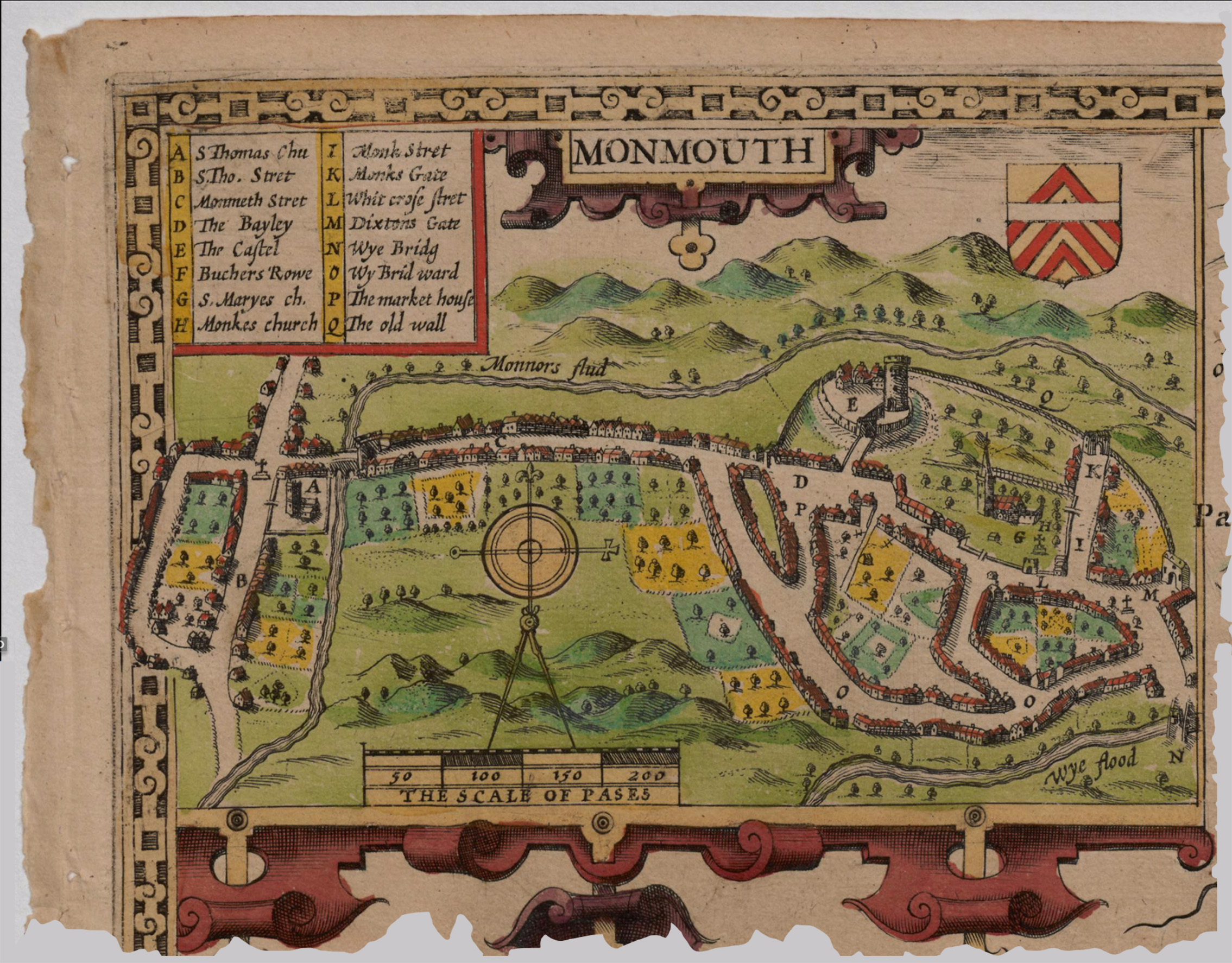
1610 map of Monmouth by cartographer John Speed, showing Dixton (East) Gate (marked M)

"There are some lovely spots in the town centre, none prettier than St James's Square, with its old war memorial in the shadow of a romantic-looking tree." This is the description of St James Square (pictured) in Monmouth, Wales that appeared in The Telegraph of 25 February 2006. The Monmouth War Memorial, which commemorates the fallen of the First and Second World Wars, was the work of sculptor W. Clarke of Llandaff. The monument was installed near the western tip of triangular St James Square in 1921, in front of a mature Catalpa, now known as the Monmouth Catalpa Tree.

While St James Square does not appear on the 1610 map of Monmouth drawn by cartographer John Speed, Dixton Gate (East Gate), just east of the square, is shown on the early 17th-century map (pictured). St James Square is located within the medieval walls of Monmouth. Whitecross Street extends from Church Street eastward, terminating at the roundabout encircling St James Square. St James Square continues to bring the community together. It serves as the site of ceremonies held on Armistice Day and Remembrance Sunday.

On some maps of Monmouth, the eastern segment of Whitecross Street, from its intersection with Monk Street to its termination on the roundabout, is also given the name St James Square. As a consequence, some buildings along that stretch of street have both Whitecross and St James addresses. In addition, St James Street and Old Dixton Road intersect with the roundabout at its eastern aspect. In 2010, during the course of gas main replacement work at St James Square and Wyebridge Street, Mesolithic era artefacts, including flints, were excavated (link to photograph of flints below). This represented the first discovery of Mesolithic human settlement in Monmouth.

== The Monmouth Catalpa Tree ==
The Catalpa or Indian Bean Tree, one of the oldest and largest specimens in the United Kingdom, was planted on the square about 1900. The grade II listed cenotaph and tree, with adjacent lawn and flowers, are enclosed by railings. In 2005, the Catalpa was the focus of controversy when the Monmouthshire County Council condemned the tree. Other groups in the community joined to hire a professional to investigate the tree's condition. Eventually, metal rods were installed to support a number of the tree's branches.

== The buildings ==
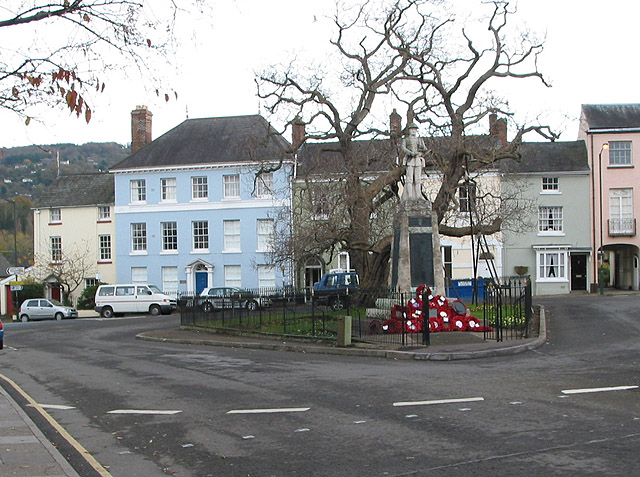
Red remembrance poppies next to Monmouth War Memorial in the square, with the Dispensary (to the left) and Ebberley House (behind Catalpa)

St James House (pictured below) at 10 St James Square also has an address recorded at Whitecross Street. It is on the north side of the western end of the square. The 18th-century, grade II listed building has a red brick exterior. The three-storey, five-bay house features a tall, arched window above the entrance. The building was part of Monmouth School, used as a boarding house.

12 St James Square is a two-storey, listed building. While the facade is of the 18th century, the original house is believed to be older. The building has a slate roof and stucco exterior.

19 St James Square, Burton House, is an early 19th-century, listed building. The three-storey building has a pebbledash (roughcast) exterior and operates as a guest house.

The Dispensary (pictured above and below) in St James Square is also referred to as Cartref. It is recorded as being at 23 St James Square in at least one document. Cartref is a mid-18th-century, Grade II listed building. It is one of 24 blue plaque buildings on the Monmouth Heritage Trail. The three-storey, five-bay building features a hipped roof of Welsh slate with spike finials and large brick chimneys.

Ebberley House (pictured above and below) is also recorded at 23 St James Square in at least one document. It is a grade II listed building, just to the right of the Dispensary. The record held by the Royal Commission on the Ancient and Historical Monuments of Wales indicates that a "mid 19th century painting shows a pair of double gabled, 17th century houses" at the location. The current exterior appears to be of the 19th century, with stucco over brick. The entrance to the left features a round headed doorway with fanlight and six-panelled door. To the right of the entrance, there is a large, tripartite window. Cast iron railings are present. The house now operates as a bed and breakfast.

25 St James Square is an early 19th-century, listed building. It has a three-storey, two-bay elevation and a pedimented doorway.

33 St James Square (pictured below) has an alternate address, 33 Whitecross Street. The grade II listed house is most probably of the 18th century. While the house is three storeys at the front elevation, the rear has a two-storey elevation. There is a circa 1900 canted bay to the right of the entrance, which has a six-panelled door.

The Old Nag's Head (pictured above and below) at St James Square and Old Dixton Road is an early 19th-century building which incorporates the remnants of the East Gate, the Dixton Gate. The gate was otherwise demolished and replaced by the turnpike gate on Old Dixton Road. The medieval portion of the tower gate is red sandstone. The half-round tower of unpainted sandstone projects from the north gable of the building. The remaining portion of the inn is painted. The roof is of Welsh slate and there are red brick chimneys.

The Dixton Gate or East Gate (pictured below and in map above) at St James Square and Old Dixton Road represents the only standing remains of Monmouth's medieval town walls and gates other than the Monnow Bridge Gatehouse. Listed with Cadw, it is incorporated into The Old Nag's Head as described above. The red sandstone tower gate has a battered base.

The Old Toll House or Dixton Gate Turnpike at 16 Old Dixton Road and the square is a listed building. The toll house is positioned on the left side of the road, with its canted end facing toward the street. The early 19th-century turnpike toll house has a Welsh slate roof and is painted. This was replaced by the toll house on New Dixton Road after the new street was laid out in 1837.

== Gallery ==
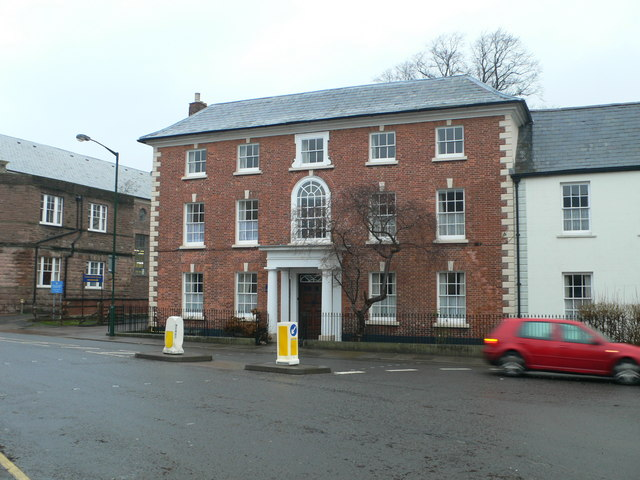
St James House, address also at Whitecross Street

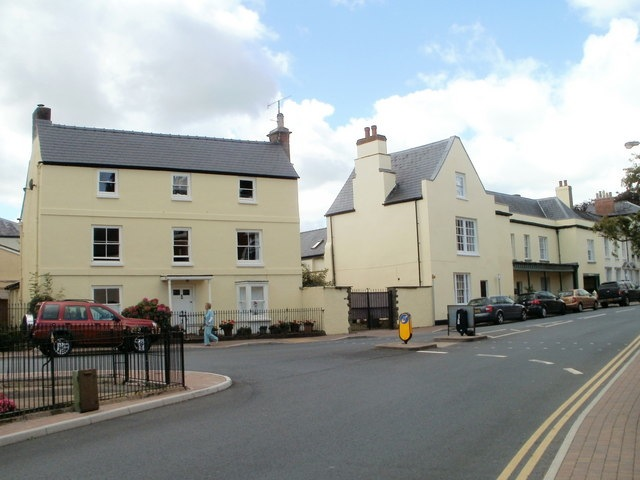
33 St James Square,
also 33 Whitecross Street

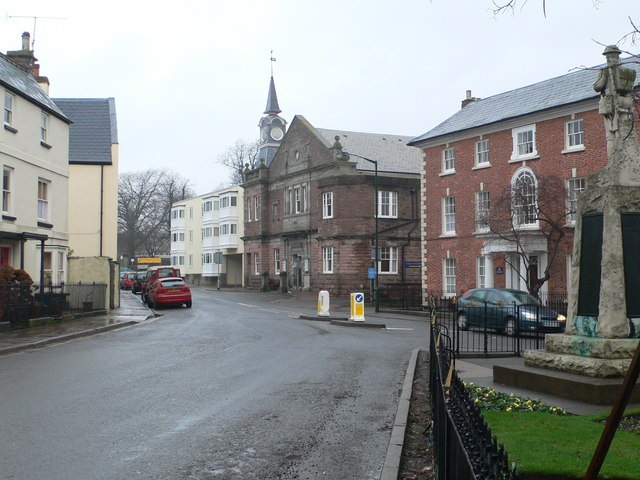
33 St James Square (left),
St James House (right)

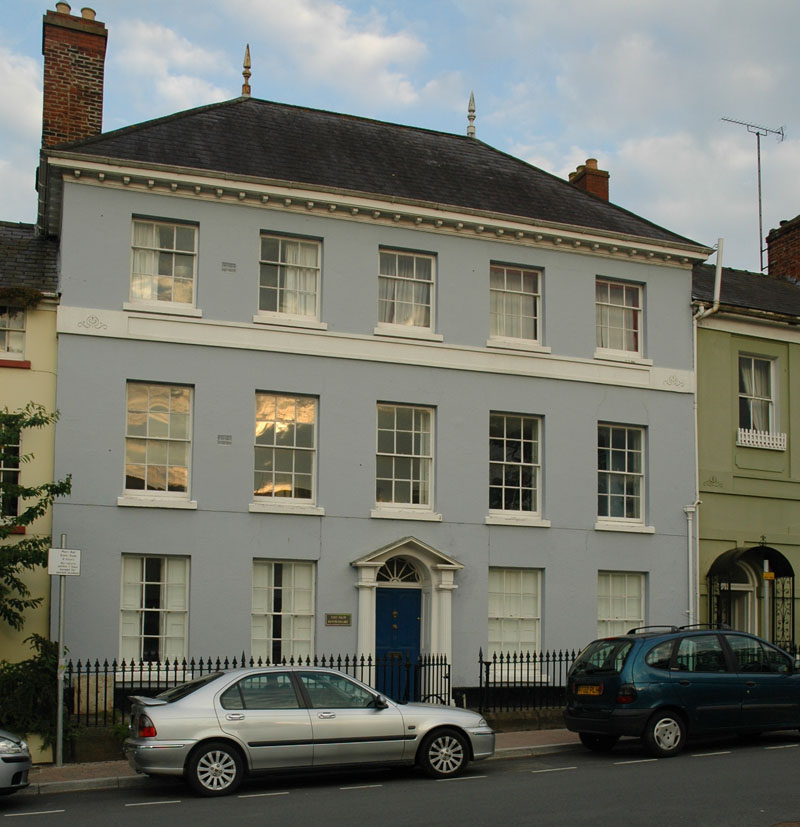
The Dispensary, Cartref,
at St James Square

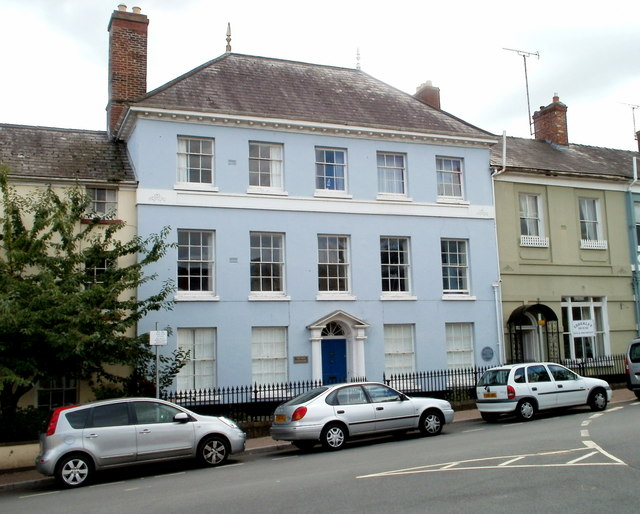
The Dispensary (centre)
and Ebberley House (right)

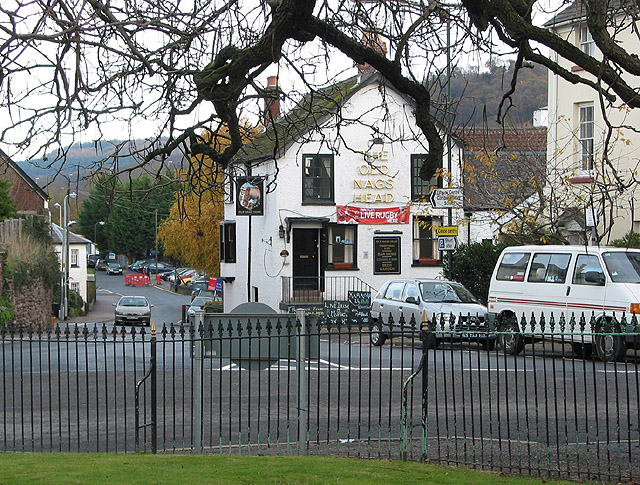
The Old Nag's Head
from St James Square

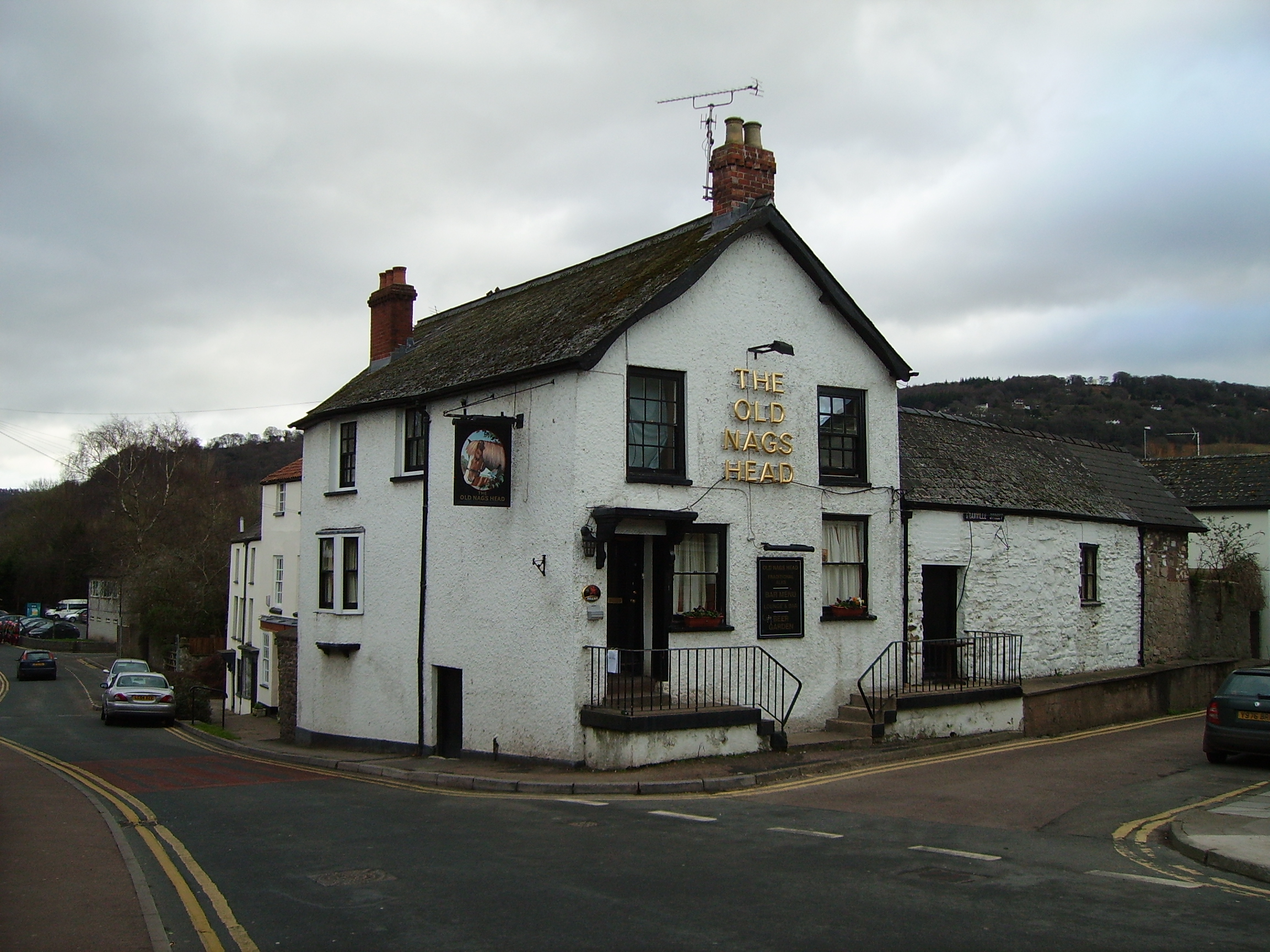
The Old Nag's Head
at Old Dixton Road

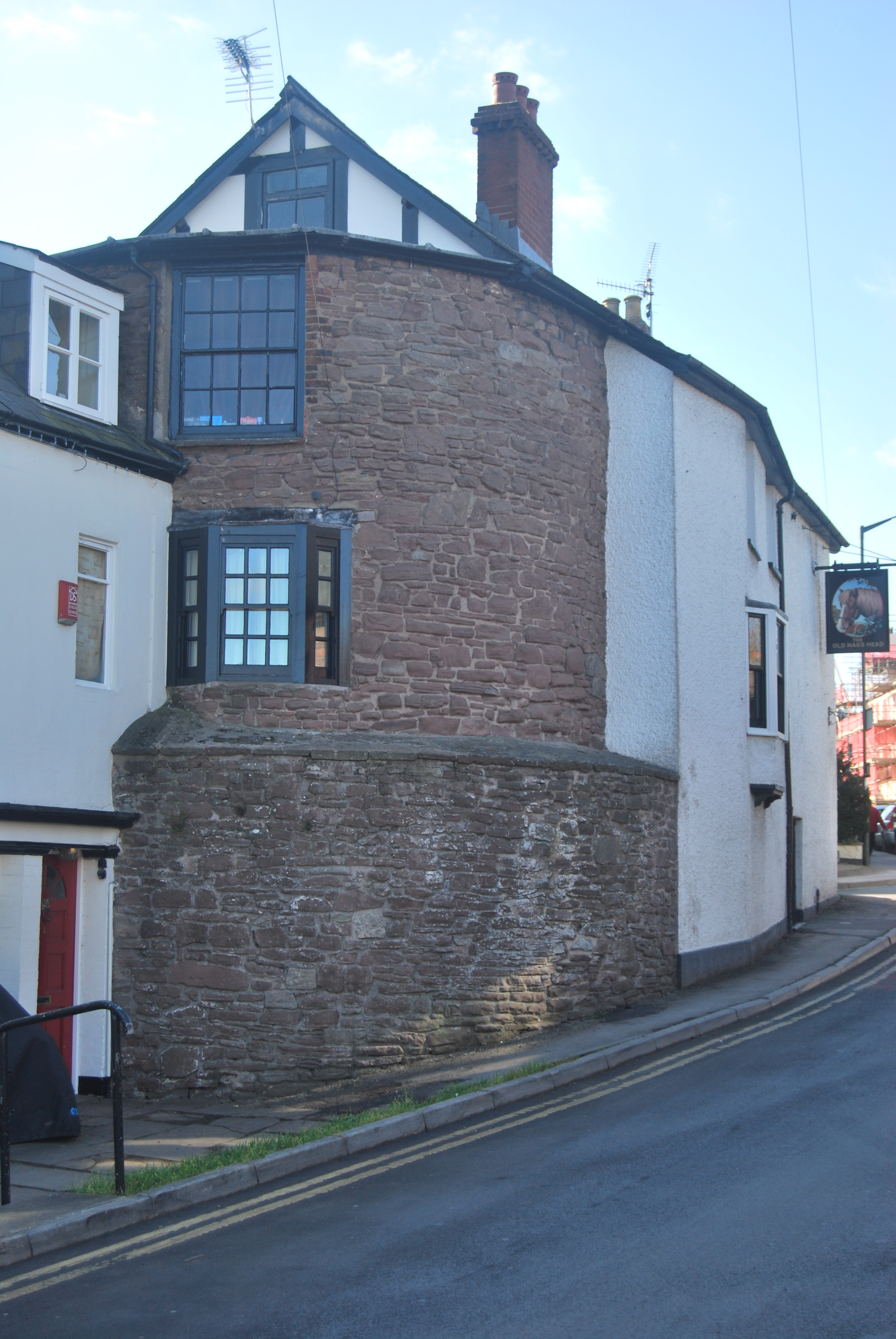
Dixton Gate (East Gate)
at The Old Nag's Head

== See also ==
- Whitecross Street, Monmouth
- Monmouth in the Mesolithic period
- Monmouth Town Walls and Defences
- The Indian Bean Tree, St James Square, Monmouth
