= Monmouth in the Mesolithic period =

Artefacts found in Monmouth, Wales

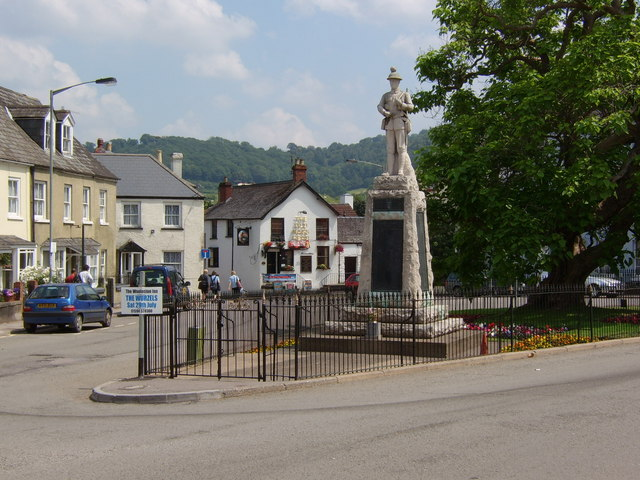
St James' Square, one of two excavated sites in Monmouth where Mesolithic artefacts were found

The discovery of artefacts at two excavation sites in 2010 revealed human settlement at Monmouth in the Mesolithic period. The artefacts uncovered by archaeologists at St James' Square and Wyebridge Street included charcoal, flints, and bone fragments. The discovery has led to the conclusion that the site of Monmouth, adjoining the confluence of the rivers Monnow and Wye in south east Wales, was inhabited thousands of years earlier than previously believed.

== Background ==
The earliest known settlement in Monmouth prior to the most recent find was about 2,500 years old. The excavations that took place in 2010 during the course of gas main replacement work at St James' Square and Wyebridge Street drew the attention of local archaeologists. The sites included the former riverbanks of the River Wye before its change in course. It initially ran along what is now St James' Street. Monmouth archaeologists, including Jane Bray and Stephen Clarke, had watched the excavation work closely and were intermittently evaluating the trenches. While monitoring the excavation process, Clarke, chairman of the Monmouth Archaeological Society, noticed a fleck of charcoal. It was in ancient sands, below thousands of years of Roman remains and river pebbles. The charcoal alerted the archaeologists to the possibility of additional significant findings.

== Findings ==
The artefacts that the Monmouth archaeologists discovered were flint tools and bone fragments, in addition to charcoal. Archaeologist Clarke notified Elizabeth Walker, curator of Paleolithic and Mesolithic Archaeology at the National Museum Wales in Cardiff. She indicated that the flints were from the Mesolithic era. The curator initially estimated that they were about 6,500 to 7,500 years old. They included microliths, both flint arrow points and flint harpoon barbs that would have been attached to wood or antler. The microliths were used for fishing or hunting. Another artefact that was retrieved was a scraper that could have been used to clean animal skins or scrape bark and small branches. In addition to the stone tools, waste pieces of flint from the production of tools were found.

== Conclusions ==
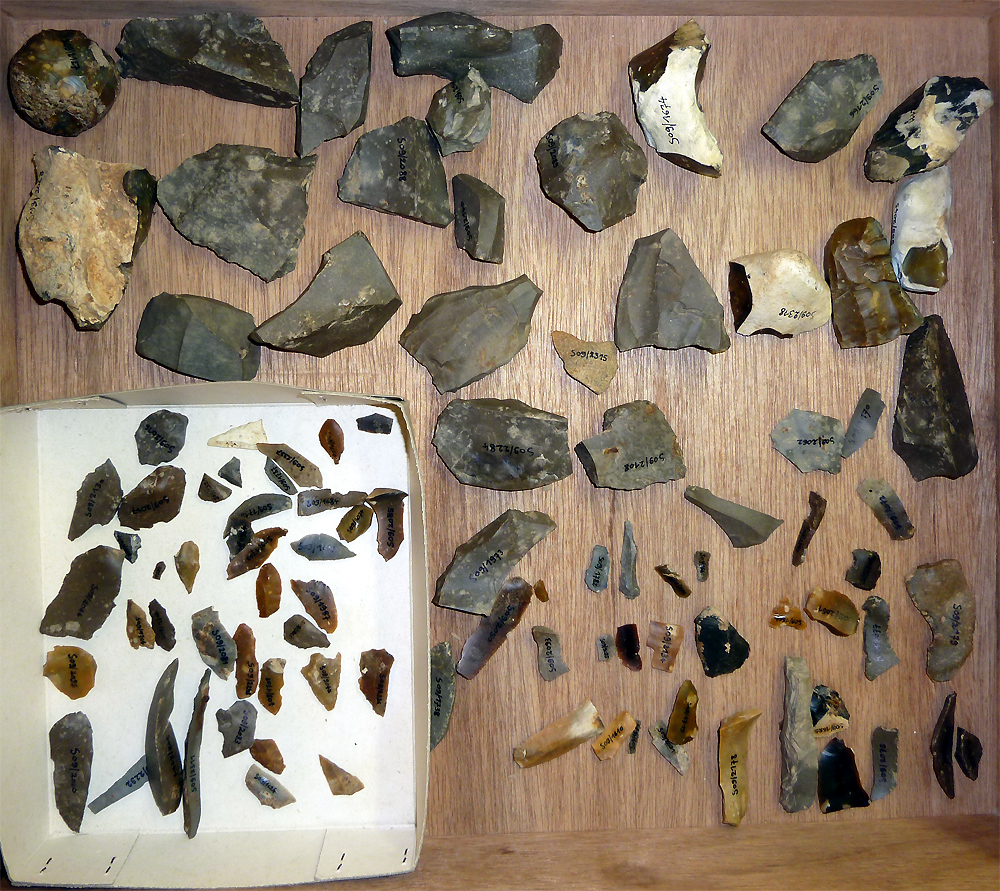
Examples of stone tools including Mesolithic microliths

The archaeologists concluded that there was human settlement in Monmouth thousands of years earlier than formerly thought. The findings revealed that the River Wye supported a camp of settlers during the Mesolithic era of the Stone Age, the Middle Stone Age. Elizabeth Walker, the curator at the National Museum of Wales, initially suggested in October 2010 that the artefacts were consistent with hunter-gatherers utilizing the river for food and transport about 7,000 years ago. However, Walker examined and dated the artefacts and apparently revised her analysis following formal evaluation; in an article from November 2010, Monmouth archaeologist Stephen Clarke announced that the finds dated back to about 10,000 years ago. Walker indicated that the settlers were nomadic, speculating that they resided near the river in the winter and perhaps hunted in the hills during the summer. However, historian and author Jeremy Knight, chairman of the Monmouthshire Antiquarian Association, had a slightly different take on the migratory nature of the Mesolithic settlers. He indicated that there were few known Mesolithic sites, and all of those on the coast. The nomads spent their summers on the coast and migrated inland for the winter. Therefore, the Monmouth site represented the first known inland site, the half of nomads' lives spent during the winter months.

Walker indicated that after the Ice Age, with improvement of the climate, plants, including trees, had returned. People had also returned to the British Isles, following the game that sought out plant food. She indicated that the settlers also relied on fish for their diet. While findings of the type discovered in Monmouth had been found in Monmouthshire, none had been located next to the river. Temporary, nomadic settlements of the era were generally thought to be about 25 meters in width. The discovery of the flints at two sites, St James' Square and Wyebridge Street, indicated that either the settlement was very large or there were two separate Stone Age camps. Radiocarbon dating of the charcoal was planned through the Scottish Universities Environmental Research Centre, a collaborative facility owned by both the University of Edinburgh and the University of Glasgow. In addition, it was anticipated that Wales & West Utilities, one of the largest gas pipeline companies in the British Isles, would fund the dating as well as the geological examination of the excavation site.
