= The Dispensary, Monmouth =

The Dispensary
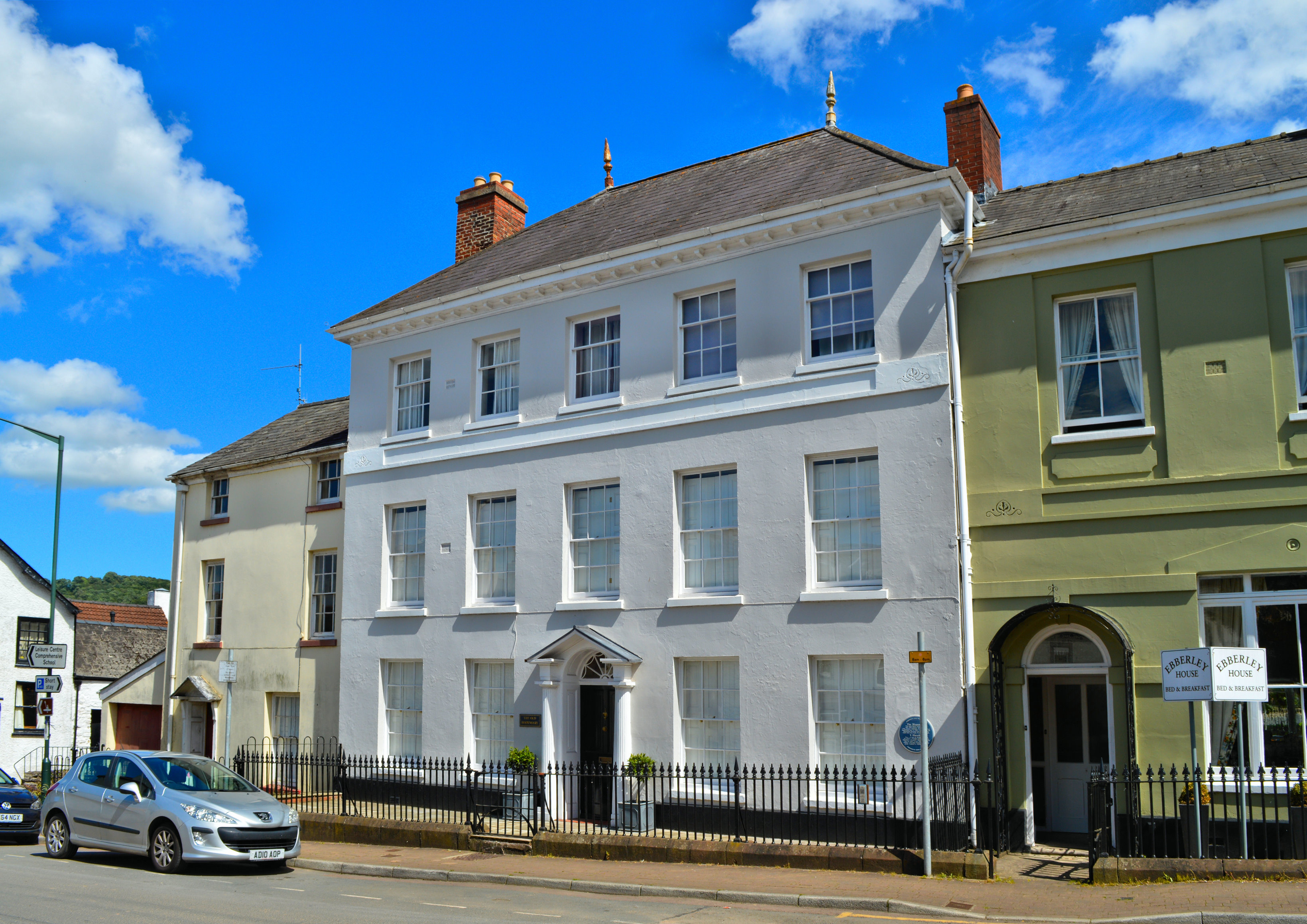
- Old Dispensary, St James Square
- Interactive map of the The Dispensary area

General information
- Architectural style: Georgian
- Location: Monmouth, Wales
- Coordinates: 51.81301°N 2.7106°W
- Completed: <1868

The Dispensary is a Georgian town house which is fairly typical of many town-centre houses in Monmouth, Wales, dating from the mid 18th century, but with early 19th-century additions. It stands in St James Square, opposite the Catalpa tree. The building was listed at Grade II on 27 June 1952.

The architectural historian John Newman calls this the "one substantial eighteenth century house" in St James Street, though it is surrounded by later attractive façades. A dispensary was established here in 1857. This became the Monmouth Hospital and Dispensary, with nine beds, in 1868, and closed in 1903. The dispensary is one of 24 buildings on the Monmouth Heritage Trail, marked by a ceramic blue plaque on the wall.

== History ==
A dispensary had been set up at Little Castle House, Castle Hill, in 1810, but it moved to St James Square in 1868 where it became the town's hospital, funded by local benefactors. Sir James Paget (Surgeon Extraordinary to Queen Victoria), who inspected the premises in 1873, said it was one of "the most convenient and best ventilated and arranged Institutions he had ever seen". It mainly benefitted the poor although it was the deserving poor as those on parish-relief were given a low priority. The Dispensary served as a cottage hospital, except that cases involving childbirth, hospice cases and those with mental diseases were turned away. The annual cost of each bed in 1868 was about £40; this was raised by donations made at Monmouth's banks or directly at the Dispensary. The waiting room displayed the names of major benefactors, which included a gift of £1,000 from John E. W. Rolls (a grandfather of Charles Rolls), who was President of the Institution. Rolls covered the cost of "The Hendre Bed" in perpetuity. The number of outpatients treated in 1876–1877 was over 1600; there were 60 inpatients. The Dispensary's catchment area extended to about eight miles outside Monmouth, including part of the Forest of Dean.

The lack of an operating room and the difficult stairs at the Dispensary had convinced the authorities that a new hospital was essential and this led to the Dispensary's closure. The Hospital moved from St James Square in 1903 to the Cottage Hospital on the Hereford Road.

In 1907, the French Sisters were running a private school in the old dispensary building, offering both boarders and day pupils lessons in French, music, painting, drawing, needlework and general education. Soon afterwards, a children's home was established here, a use which continued up to the end of the twentieth century.
