= Little Castle House, Monmouth =

Building in Monmouth, Wales

Little Castle House
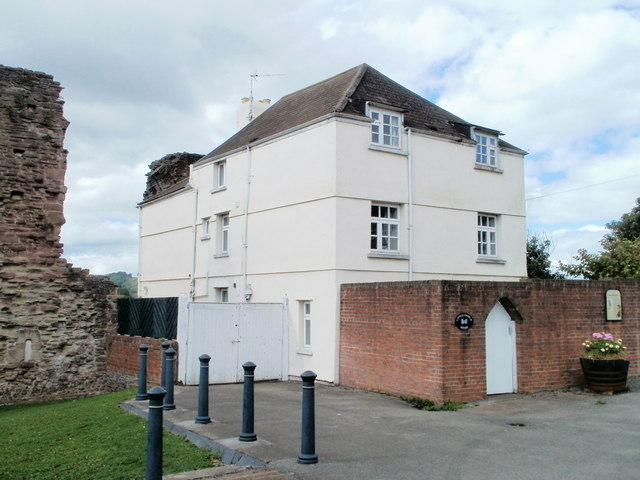
- Little Castle House
- Interactive map of the Little Castle House area
- Alternative names: The Oldest Dispensary in Monmouth

General information
- Location: The Castle, Monmouth, Wales
- Coordinates: 51.812488°N 2.716998°W
- Current tenants: Private House

Little Castle House is a building in Monmouth, Wales. Also known as The Dispensary it was one of Monmouth's early medical facilities.

== History ==
It was founded to provide free advice and medicine for the poor, and to encourage vaccination. The support and financing was largely from donations, concerts, fees and exhibitions. Three doctors were appointment annually after a table of their skills and cures had been examined. The dispensary had an income of around £200 annually and dispensed around £160 worth of medicine each year. It continued until Monmouth Hospital and Dispensary was opened at Cartref, St James' Square, in 1868.
