= The Griffin, Monmouth =

The Griffin
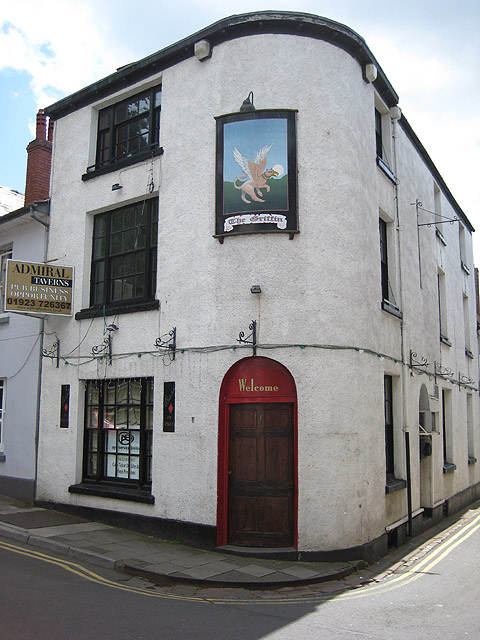
- Interactive map of the The Griffin area
- Former names: The Old Griffin

General information
- Type: Public House (since early 1880s)
- Location: 1 Whitecross Street, Monmouth, Wales
- Coordinates: 51.812797°N 2.714103°W
- Completed: 18th Century

Design and construction
- Designations: Grade II listed

The Griffin is a former public house in Whitecross Street, Monmouth, Wales. The building dates from the 18th century and has been grade II listed since 2005. Its name and sign refer to the legendary creature, the griffin.

In the 18th century the pub was called The Old Griffin. It was rebuilt in the 1830s and refurbished in the 1990s. The building is situated on the corner of Whitecross Street and St Mary's Street, which were both main thoroughfares for the town until the mid-18th century. The building's rounded entrance was designed to accommodate traffic turning on the tight corner. The Landlady of the pub was once Eleanor Jones. At the turn of the 19th century, it was occupied by Charles Ballinger who also produced mineral water, enabling the pub to cater for more temperate drinkers.
