= Priory House, Monmouth =

Building in Monmouth, Wales

Priory House
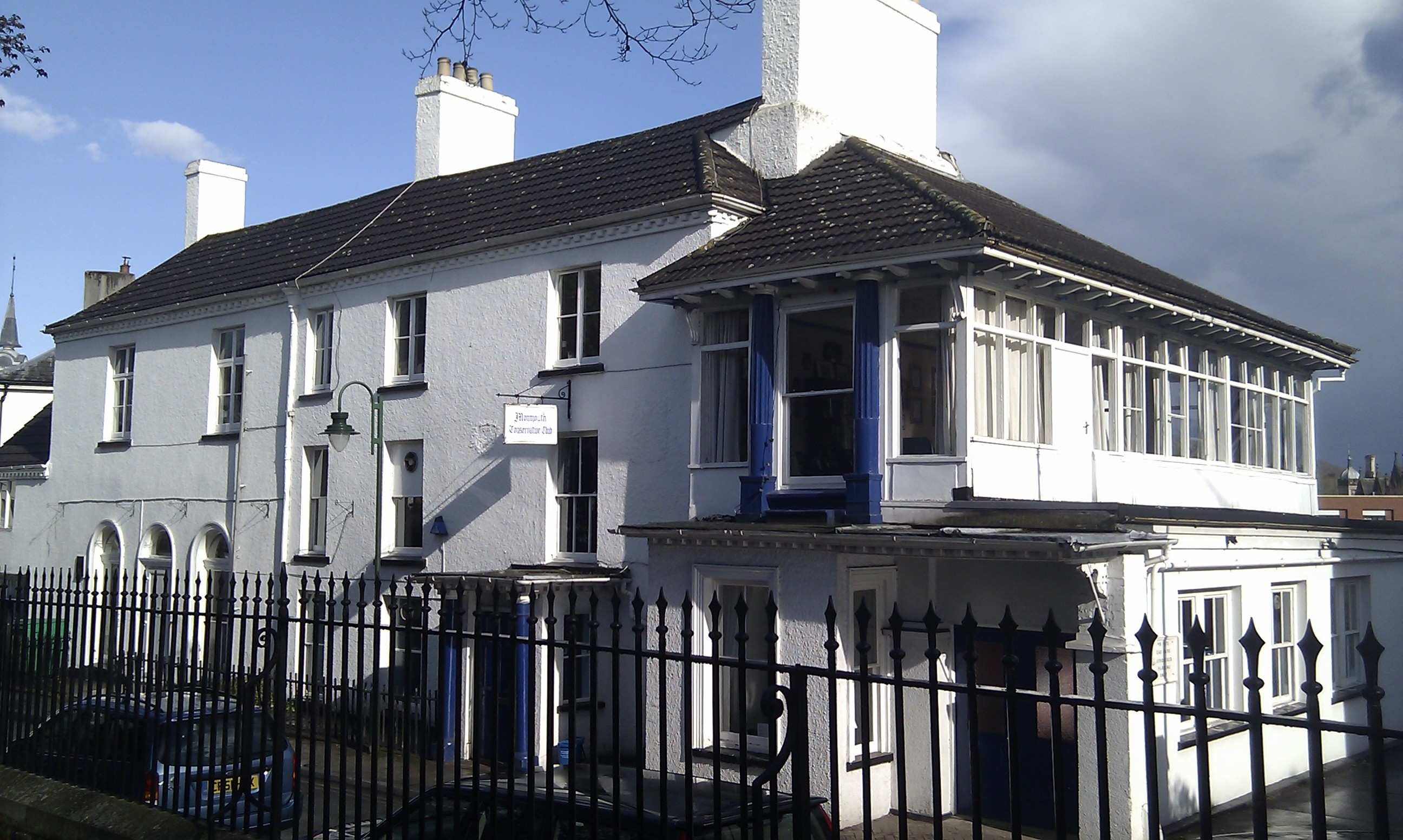
- Priory House
- Interactive map of the Priory House area

General information
- Location: Whitecross Street, Monmouth, Wales
- Coordinates: 51.813108°N 2.712988°W
- Current tenants: Private Club
- Completed: 18th century

Design and construction
- Designations: Grade II Listed

Priory House is a Grade II Listed building in Monmouth, Wales.

First listed on 15 August 1974 it is an 18th-century building of 3 storeys, with a modern, dark red tile roof. It has had many alterations since its construction in the 18th century.

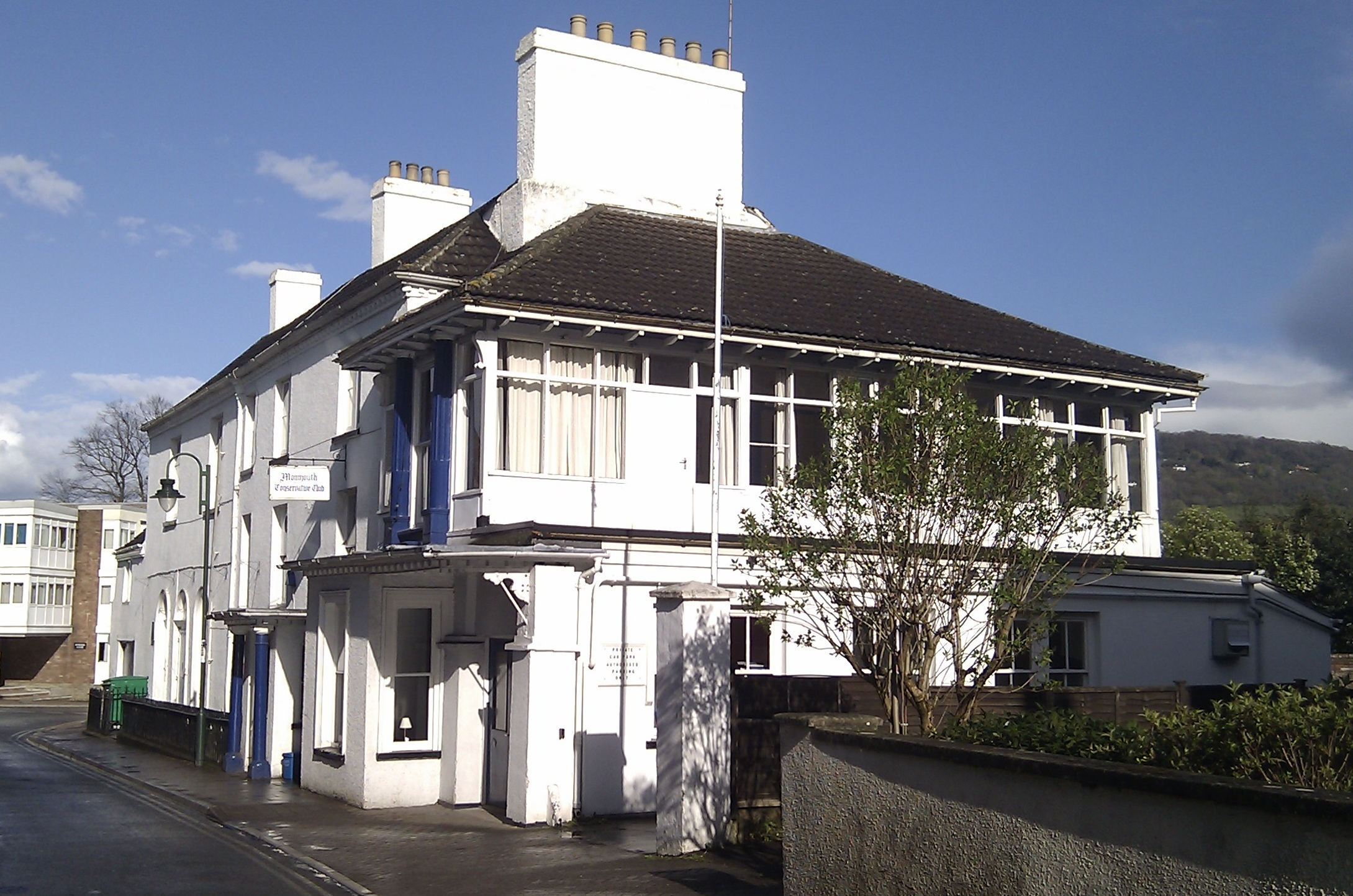
Priory House view from the road

In the first part of the 19th century the building was home to the Monmouth Classical Academy which was a private boarding School. From about 1830 the Academy was run by Rev J Gosling. Fees were £20 per annum, Greek & Latin £3, Math £3, French £4, Geography £2. In the 20th and 21st centuries, the building was the clubhouse and headquarters of the Monmouth Conservative Association. The clubhouse was closed at the end of 2023 and the building was put up for sale.
