= Monmouth Archaeological Society =

Archaeological society based in Wales

- Location: Monmouth, Wales
- Chair: Stephen Clarke

The Monmouth Archaeological Society is a society of amateur and professional archaeologists who encourage the preservation of archaeological artifacts and sites, publish, and carry out archaeological studies in and around Monmouth, Wales.

== History ==
It began at Monmouth School. It was created by Arthur Sockett, a teacher at the boys school; membership was therefore originally limited to boys.

In 1986 the organisation was involved in a protest in the town of Monmouth when it became apparent that developers had not only discovered important archaeological remains but had already destroyed them. Members of the society anticipated that more damage was to follow and the local council were implicated. One of the archaeologists was made an MBE for their part in this work.

The society ran the largest long standing urban amateur excavation in the UK, at 22–24 Monnow Street, Monmouth from 1990 to 2000. Objects unearthed ranged from the Mesolithic period to the present day. These included coins, pottery, bones, and glass. The excavation found a medieval defensive castle ditch, a well with cesspit nearby, a Roman grave with standing stone marker, and possible evidence of a building along Monnow Street during the Dark Age.

The current chair of Monmouth Archaeological Society is Stephen Clarke. Members include Stuart Wilson, Arthur Sockett and Dave Jemmett.

The society won the Pitt Rivers Award in 1988 and the Silver Trowel Award for the greatest initiative in Archaeology.

The constitution still states the membership fee to be 5 shillings.
