= The Indian Bean Tree, St James Square, Monmouth =

The Indian Bean Tree
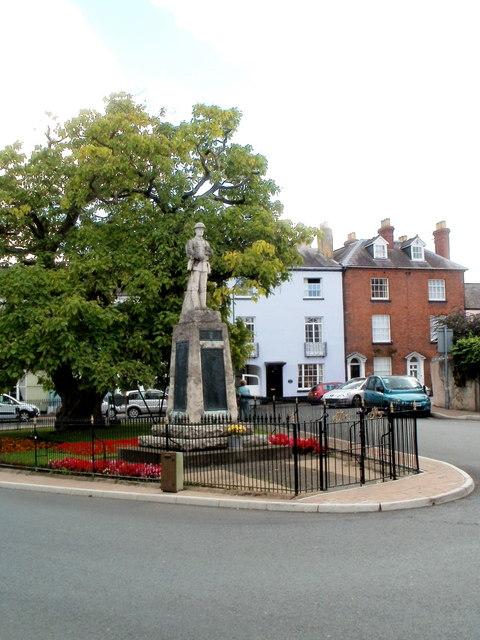
- Indian Bean Tree in St James Square, behind the Monmouth War Memorial, September 2010
- Interactive map of the The Indian Bean Tree area
- Alternative names: Catalpa bignonioides

General information
- Location: St James Square, Monmouth, Wales
- Coordinates: 51.813034°N 2.711059°W

St James Square in Monmouth, Monmouthshire, Wales is the site of a historic Indian Bean Tree. The Catalpa bignonioides, a native of the southeastern United States, was planted in the square in about 1900. It was joined by the Monmouth War Memorial in 1921. After more than one hundred years of presiding over the square, the tree became the focus of controversy when it was condemned by the Monmouthshire County Council in 2005. The decision was met with fierce community opposition. The parties involved resolved their differences in 2006, and the tree received treatment, albeit some of it unauthorized. By 2011, the Indian Bean Tree in St James Square was flourishing.

== Twentieth-century history ==
"There are some lovely spots in the town centre, none prettier than St James's Square, with its old war memorial in the shadow of a romantic-looking tree." The tree mentioned in The Telegraph of 25 February 2006 was a reference to the Indian Bean Tree (pictured) that was planted in St James Square in Monmouth about 1900. Properly known as Catalpa bignonioides, it is a native of the southeastern United States. At the time of the unveiling of the Monmouth War Memorial (pictured) in 1921, the Catalpa was already a mature tree. In 1946, a rod was installed to support the main limbs of the tree. The Indian Bean Tree is considered by the Monmouth Action Group to be "one of the best examples of the species in Britain." It is thought to be one of the oldest and largest specimens in the United Kingdom. The Indian Bean Tree is positioned behind the war memorial and surrounded by lawn, with an adjacent formal planting of flowers. The cenotaph, tree, lawn, and garden are enclosed by railings.

== Controversy ==
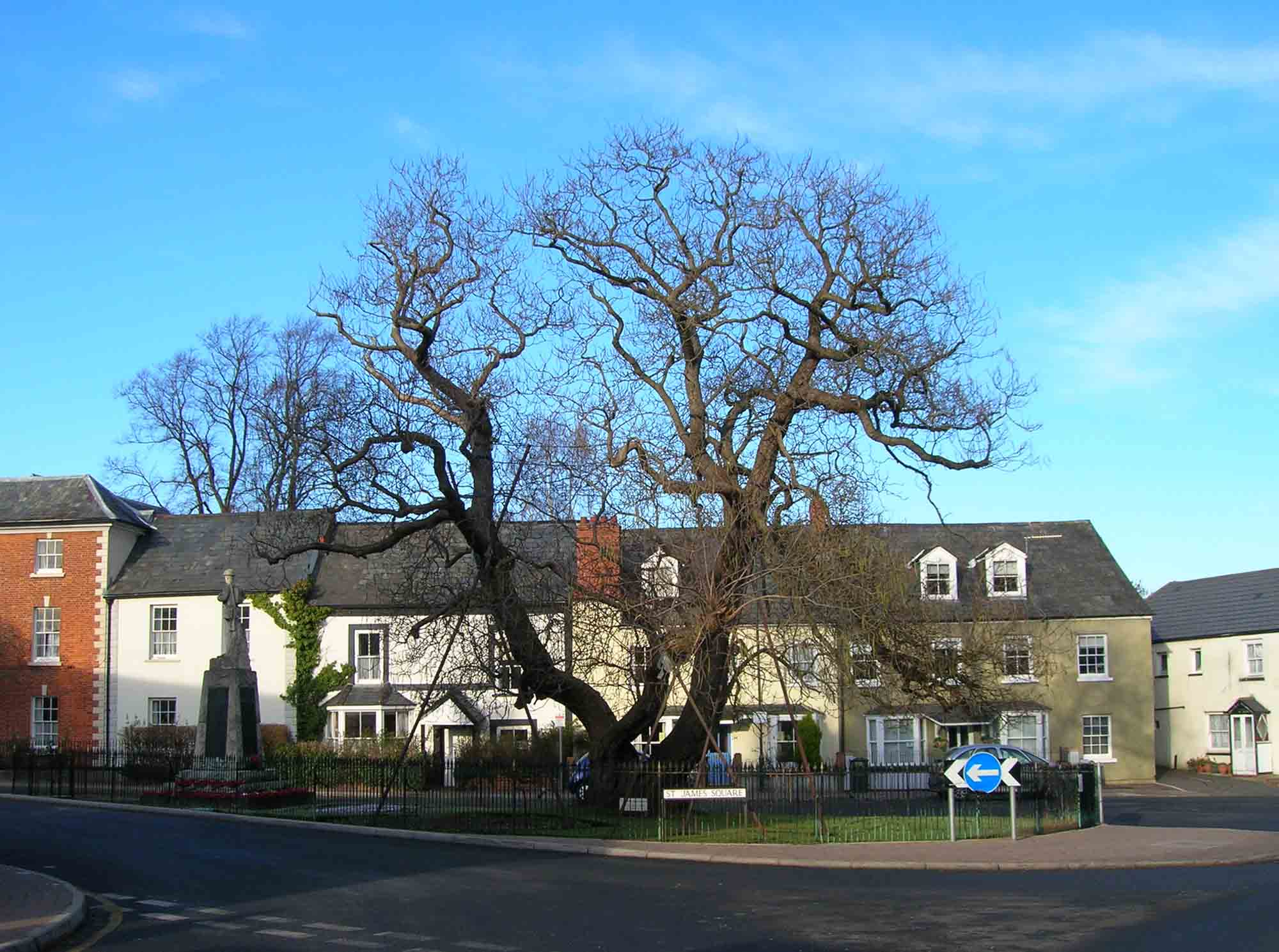
Metal supports were placed under some large branches of the Indian Bean Tree c. 2006.

The Indian Bean Tree's poor health was brought to the attention of the Monmouthshire County Council in summer 2005 by one of the judges of the Wales in Bloom competition. The tree was subsequently condemned by the council. A spokesperson for the council indicated that the reason for taking down the tree was to avoid the possibility of litigation. The council was concerned that portions of the tree could fall and result in damage to people or property. In response, the Monmouth Town Council, Monmouth Archaeological Society, and Monmouth Action Group collaborated and hired an arboriculturalist, Roy Finch, to investigate the condition of the Catalpa. The tree surgeon indicated that the Catalpa was “an outstanding part of our tree heritage and worthy of the effort and expense involved in its management.” He recommended treatment of the Indian Bean Tree to reduce the associated risks and to extend the life of the tree.

The county council requested a second analysis by a different professional, Steve Ambler. That report, before November 2005, also concluded that the Catalpa could be made safe; however, the second evaluation suggested that the tree would probably die within a few years, even if treatment was undertaken. A revised report from Roy Finch of Malvern failed to dissuade the county council from their plan to condemn the Catalpa. Rather, it was reported in November 2005 that the council had solicited bids to fell the tree in St James Square in the face of intense opposition from the community. The Monmouthshire County Council continued to state that the tree was dangerous, in part due to its proximity to a school. The decision of the council was that the tree should be felled, and replaced with a new Catalpa.

Archaeologist Stephen Clarke, chairman of the Monmouth Action Group, suggested that there was a conflict of interest with regard to the actions of the Monmouthshire County Council. He indicated that council members were "the guardians of the conservation area and so they just give themselves permission. The locals can do very little about it." Clarke recommended that residents continue to fight to maintain their local heritage. However, as an example of the difficulties inherent in saving Monmouth's heritage, the archaeologist mentioned that the town formerly had "one of the most beautiful urban parks in the country, Drybridge Park, where every tree that would grow in Britain used to be planted but they've nearly all been chopped down." Clarke stated that, in a survey conducted by British Archaeology, "Monmouth was once classified as one of Britain's top 10 historical towns." The BBC News reported on 30 December 2011 that Monmouth had at one point been rated by the Council for British Archaeology as the seventh best town (for archaeological purposes) in Britain.

== Progress to resolution ==
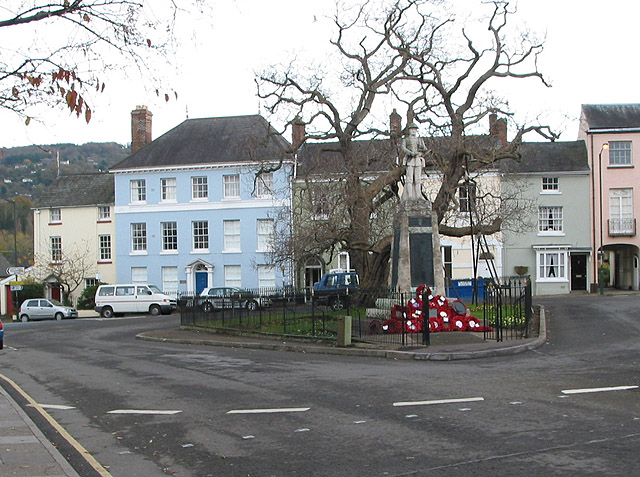
Indian Bean Tree with supporting rods, behind Monmouth War Memorial, Nov 2007

On 9 January 2006, Stephen Clarke made a presentation to the Monmouth Town Council. He submitted a new evaluation of the Catalpa by Jerry Ross, a third expert. Ross was of the opinion that, while the tree was in poor health, it was "far from dying." Clarke reminded council members that this was the third expert that had been hired, the first commissioned by the groups that he represented, Roy Finch, and the second commissioned by Monmouthshire County Council, Steve Ambler. Clarke indicated to the town council that members of the county council had dismissed the most recent evaluation performed by the third professional. The archaeologist also advised the town council that he and the chief executive of the county council were at odds with regard to the terminology used to describe the health of the tree, as well as the quantity of correspondence that had been received in support of the Catalpa. Clarke suggested that another evaluation be commissioned. As the county council was still intent on felling the Indian Bean Tree, Clarke had asked lawyers to seek a judicial review. Fundraising efforts included the sale of images of the Catalpa.

In February 2006, it was reported that the Monmouth Archaeology Group and Monmouth Action Group had arranged for another (fourth) expert to investigate the health of the Indian Bean Tree. Arborist David Lonsdale advised that any risk posed by the Catalpa could be diminished with a two-fold approach: cutting back the top of the tree and supporting the main branches. The results of the investigation were communicated to the Monmouthshire County Council. The Indian Bean Tree at St James Square was of particular interest due to both its size and its status as one of the oldest specimens of Catalpa in the United Kingdom. The opinion of the arborist was that the value of the Catalpa merited the expense of inspection and arbor care. In addition, it was proposed that financing of the arbor work could be accomplished by utilizing the funds that had initially been targeted for felling the old tree and planting a new specimen. Lonsdale cautioned that the health of the tree would eventually deteriorate, despite treatment.

== Outcome ==
The fourth expert's evaluation of the Catalpa's condition met with a positive reception at the Monmouthshire County Council. The council worked with the Monmouth Town Council and Monmouth Action Group, and looked into performing the remedial arbor care. Treatment was undertaken, including crown reduction and general pruning that were completed by April 2006. In addition, temporary cable props had been placed by that month to support and strengthen the tree. Estimates for supporting rods were obtained: £1500 for stainless steel and £3000 for oak. Outside funding was sought to defray the expense of the tree props. Later, metal supports (pictured) were installed under some large branches of the Indian Bean Tree.

However, it was suspected that the late John "Mad Jack" Roocroft (September 1930 – January 2011), an eccentric Troy Way, Monmouth resident known for his flouting of authority, was responsible for the sudden absence of a large branch of the Indian Bean Tree which had overhung the street at St James Square. Although there was no proof, it was generally believed that it was the former millionaire's distinctive red tractor and trailer, laden with segments of the large limb, that had been spied headed away from the square early one day. His removal of the massive branch is felt to be partially responsible for the recovery of the Catalpa (link to 2011 photograph of Catalpa in bloom below). Roocroft, the son of a Lancashire farmer, had previously used his chain saw on trees in the Nelson Garden. In 2004, he applied his saw to five conifers in the garden, his reasoning being that they were not original to the Nelson Garden's 1802 design. In his February 2011 tribute to Roocroft, Stephen Clarke wrote, "Good night Jack, I dare say that there will be flowers for you to plant in Heaven, beans for you to grow and Catalpa Trees for you to prune, and of course, authority for you to annoy."
