= Rolls Hall, Monmouth =

The Rolls Hall
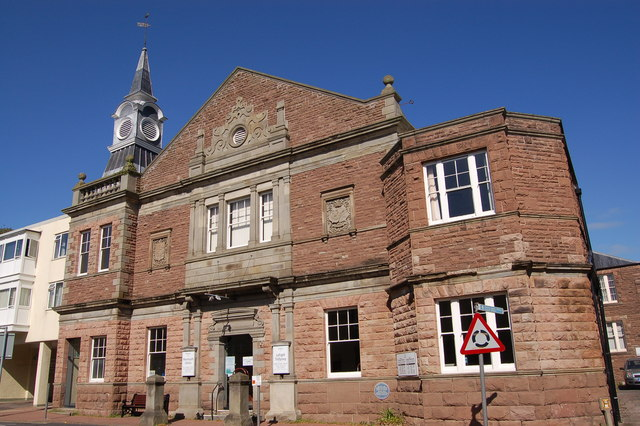
- The Rolls Hall, currently the site of Monmouth Library
- Interactive map of the The Rolls Hall area

General information
- Location: Whitecross Street, Monmouth, Wales
- Coordinates: 51°48′47.8″N 2°42′42.8″W
- Completed: 1888
- Cost: £8,000
- Client: John Rolls

Design and construction
- Architect: F.A.Powell
- Designations: Grade II listed

The Rolls Hall, Whitecross Street, Monmouth, Monmouthshire is a Victorian hall, now public library, donated to the town in celebration of Queen Victoria's Golden Jubilee by John Rolls, the future Lord Llangattock. It is a Grade II listed building as of 8 October 2005, and is one of 24 buildings on the Monmouth Heritage Trail.

== History ==
The hall was constructed in 1887-8 by F. A. Powell in a Jacobethan style, at a cost of £8,000. The materials are Old Red Sandstone and Forest ashlar. The Rolls family of The Hendre were substantial Monmouthshire landowners and benefactors to the town, and attended the building's opening on 24 May 1888. The building was designed by F.A.Powell who was the eldest son of the Mayor of Monmouth, Mr Champney Powell. The hall was given to celebrate the Queen's Jubilee in 1888. A new organ was installed in 1889 which had novel additions to its design by William Sweetland, and the following year several paintings were installed. In September 1890, a successful Fine Art and Industrial Exhibition was held in the building; the catalogue can be seen in the Monmouth Museum. Between 1897 and 1903, the Hall was used for a number of plays staged by the actor, director and impresario Ben Greet.

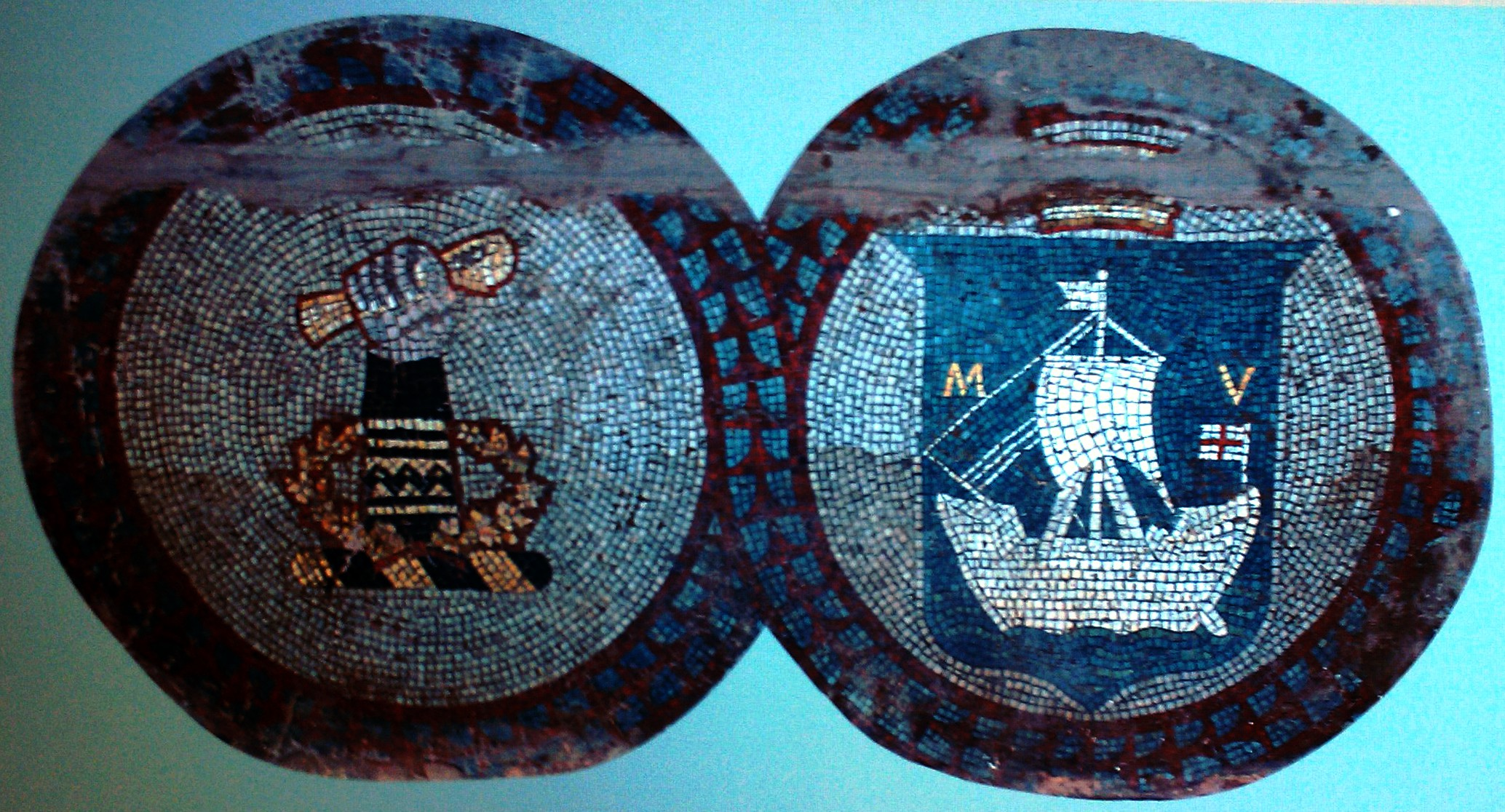
The linked emblems of the Rolls family and that of the town of Monmouth

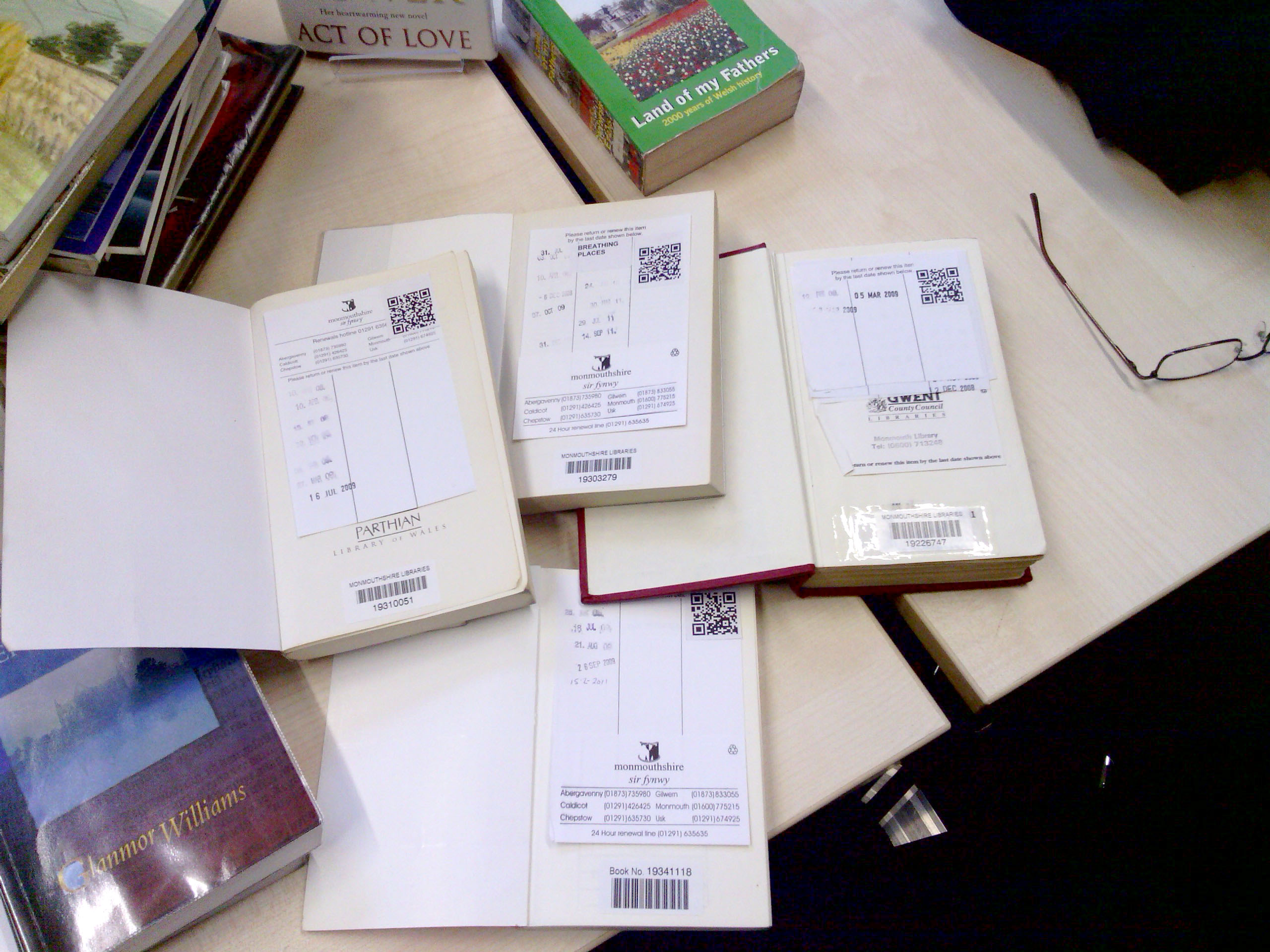
QRpedia codes in books

In 1963 the organ was inspected by an organ tuner who declared it to be useless. Water had affected the sounding boards and the instrument was falling to pieces. This was reported in the local paper but the organ remained in place for at least three years when the hall was used as a dance hall, and later as a night club.

In 1992, the building became used for the town's public library, which had previously been located at the Shire Hall. The Library was refurbished in 2010 with a £210,000 grant from the Museums Archives and Libraries: Wales, which matched funding from the County Council. The library still honours its original benefactors as large full length portraits of John Rolls, 1st Baron Llangattock, his wife Lady Llangattock and his son John Rolls, 2nd Baron Llangattock are the main decoration on one wall. However the floor mosaic, that showed the Rolls and Monmouth symbols linked together, is now exhibited on another wall.

In 2012 the library installed QRpedia codes to each bookcase as their part of the "MonmouthpediA" project which provides visitors with information about all aspects of the town. The staff also installed these codes in dozens of books that linked to the book's author.
