= Stephen Clarke (archaeologist) =

Welsh archaeologist

Stephen Harold Henry Clarke MBE
- Occupation: Archaeologist

Stephen Harold Henry Clarke is a Welsh archaeologist, he is chairman and founding member of Monmouth Archaeological Society. He was awarded an MBE (civil division) for services to archaeology in the 1997 New Year Honours.

== Memberships and awards ==
- Institute for Archaeologists, member
- Society of Antiquaries of London, fellow
- Congress of Independent Archaeologists, member
- Severn Levels Research, committee member
- Glamorgan - Gwent Archaeological Trust, Committee member
- Monmouth Archaeological Society, chairman and founding member
- Monmouth Field and History Society, chairman
- Monmouthshire Antiquarian Association, committee member
- Chepstow Archaeological Society, president
- Forest of Dean Archaeological Group, life vice-president
- Hereford Archaeological Trust, member

== Bibliography ==
- —— (2008). Down the Dig: Monmouth, an Adventure in Archaeology. Clarke Printing. ISBN 978-0-9558242-1-0.
- —— (2013). The Lost Lake, Evidence of Prehistoric boat building. ISBN 978-0-9558242-2-7
- —— (2016). The Lost Lake, Revised Edition, 8000 years overlooking the Monmouth Lake. ISBN 978-0-9558242-3-4 Clarke Printing
