= Old Nag's Head, Monmouth =

Old Nag's Head
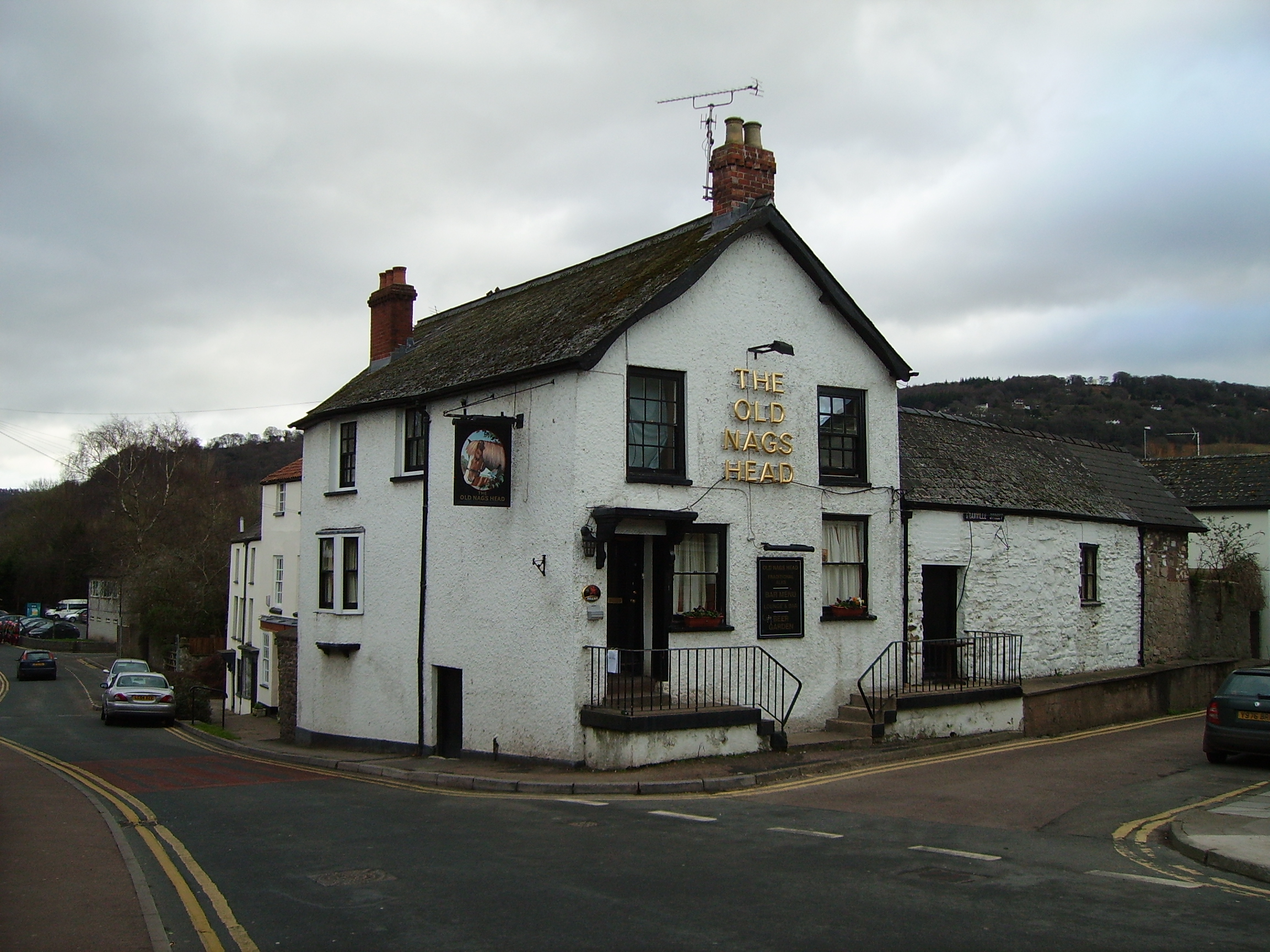
- The Old Nag's Head
- Interactive map of the Old Nag's Head area

General information
- Type: Pub
- Location: Old Dixton Road, Monmouth, Wales
- Coordinates: 51.8132°N 2.7104°W
- Completed: Between 1297 and c.1315; nineteenth century

Design and construction
- Designations: Grade II* listed

The Old Nag's Head, Old Dixton Road, Monmouth, Wales, is a nineteenth-century public house, with medieval origins, which incorporates a "stone drum tower of the town defences constructed between 1297 and c.1315." The tower is the only "upstanding remains of the town walls of Monmouth." The pub was designated a Grade II* listed building on 26 April 1955, its rating being due to "its interest as an early C19 public house which retains its character as well as a significant portion of a medieval gate-tower."

== The Dixton Gate ==
The medieval gate-tower itself was seized by Lord Charles Somerset a Royalist on 17 November 1644 at around 5am during the Civil War and was the point through which the Royalists entered Monmouth to take the town from the Parliamentarians. Somerset and 40 horses reached Dixton Gate without opposition. The guard of six men fled. The Cavaliers then broke the chain of the Dixton Gate with a crowbar and entered the town. The action itself saw several members of the Parliamentary Committee for South Wales captured along with 200 officers and men. Arms and ammunition were also taken including some hammer guns.

The other tower and rest of the Dixton Gate were removed in 1770 because they were hindering the passage of coaches.

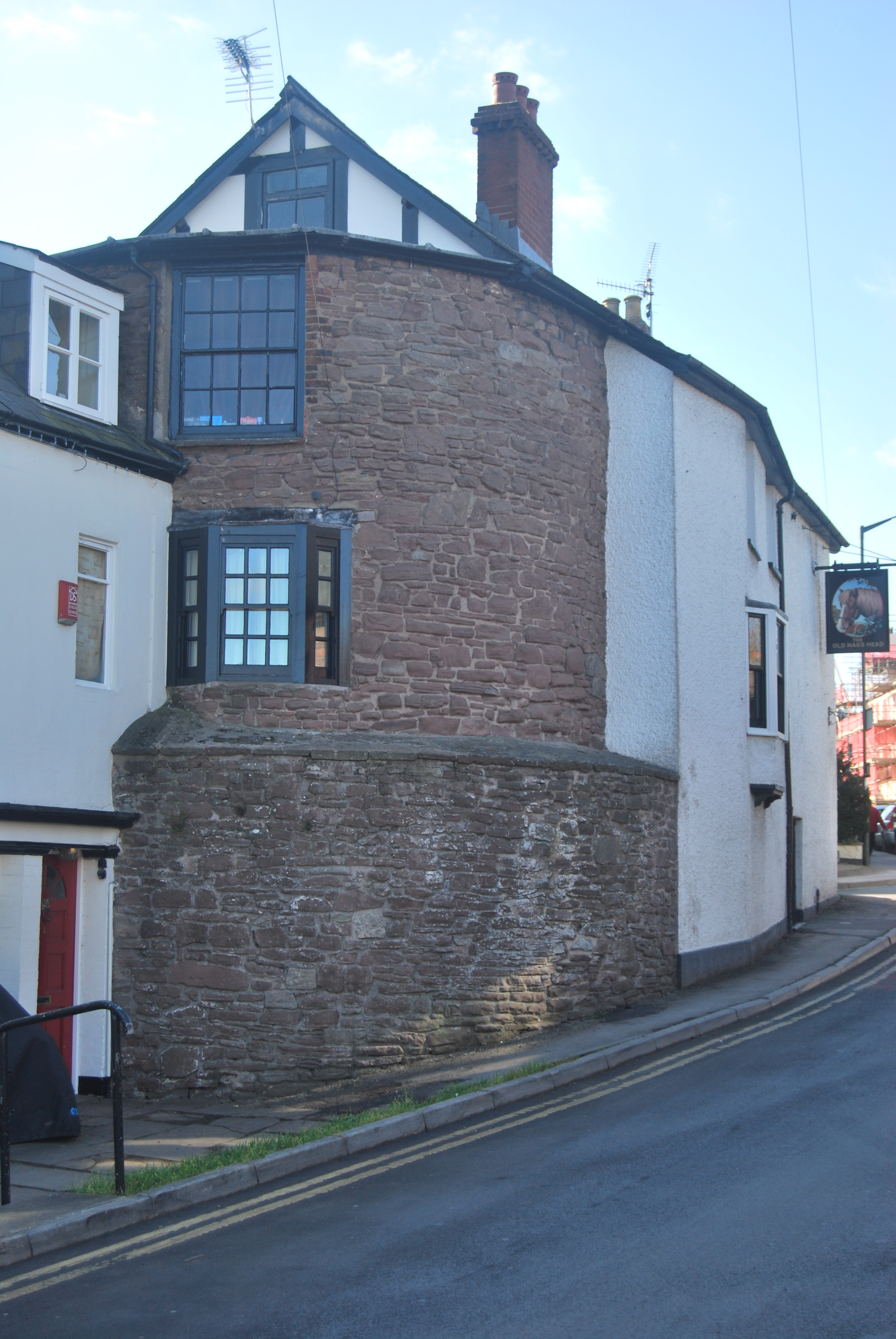
Rear of Nags Head Monmouth showing the stone work of Monmouth's Dixton Gate

== Press ==
The Lonely Planet guide describes the Old Nag's Head as "an old-fashioned, no-frills, neighbourhood pub".

== Sources ==
- Newman, J., The Buildings of Wales: Gwent/Monmouthshire, (2000) Penguin Books
