= Monmouth town walls and defences =

Coordinates: 51.81318°N 2.71045°W

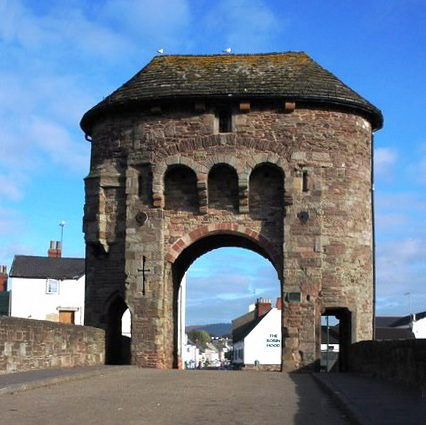
- Monnow Bridge Gatehouse, part of the Monmouth town walls and defences
- Interactive map of the Monmouth town walls and defences area

General information
- Location: Monmouth, Monmouthshire, Wales
- Opened: circa 1300

The Monmouth town walls and defences comprise the defensive system of town walls and gates built in Monmouth, Wales between 1297 and the early part of the following century. Wye Bridge Gate, East Gate (Dixton Gate), Monk's Gate, and Monnow Bridge Gate were access points to the town. West Gate, across Monnow Street, also provided access. Only the Monnow Bridge Gatehouse survives intact, albeit in a substantially modified version from the original.

== Background ==
The castle of Monmouth was originally built by the Normans in the late 11th century, as one part of a system of fortifications to help establish their dominance of the Welsh Marches, and as a base for extending their control into Wales itself. The castle, which overlooked the confluence of the rivers Wye and Monnow in a strategically important border area, was initially a modest motte and bailey structure, rebuilt in stone by 1150. A small market town developed around the castle and, in 1267, it passed into the hands of Edmund Crouchback, Earl of Lancaster and son of Henry III. In turn, it passed to his own son Henry de Lancastre. On 27 August 1297, he petitioned his uncle, Edward I, to issue a murage grant for the town. The 1297 grant was issued for five years and the funds collected allowed for the construction of the medieval town walls and gates.

== Construction and extent ==
On 1 June 1315, again at Henry de Lancastre's request, the grant was renewed for another three years, indicating that the project was either incomplete or in need of repairs. The murage indicated that the levy was to be on "all wares brought for sale into the town." Town walls were regarded as necessary for several reasons: they provided defensive protection for the Anglo-Normans against the sometimes hostile Welsh inhabitants of the nearby countryside, they protected and allowed the policing of the market, and they allowed the easier collection of taxes and dues. The walls and gates also served as a status symbol. In addition to their defensive use, the town gates were utilised for hundreds of years to collect tolls. These were authorised by the patent rolls of 1297 and 1315.

The complete course of the stone walls is uncertain. Gate towers were erected on Monnow Bridge and at several other locations, including Monk's Gate, Dixton Gate, Wye Gate, West Gate and St Stephen's Gate (the last providing access to the bailey of the castle). According to John Leland, who visited the town circa 1538, a ruined wall extended around the town at that time, together with a deep ditch or fosse.

== Monnow Bridge Gatehouse ==
The Monnow Bridge Gatehouse is the most renowned and visible portion of the Monmouth town walls and defences. Combined with the Monnow Bridge for purposes of listing, the gatehouse is both a scheduled monument and a Grade I listed building. The bridge and gatehouse were listed on 15 August 1974. The bridge on which it stands is a three span stone bridge built around 1272. The gatehouse in the centre of the bridge was added between 1297 and 1315, at the time of the construction of the town's stone walls. The bridge and gate at that time were very different from the present versions. Not only was the bridge narrower, the gate had a single archway with a portcullis. The roof of the gatehouse was lower, and featured a parapet with battlements. In addition, the machicolation arches on the facade of the gate were added later.

By 1705, the Monnow Bridge Gatehouse was in need of maintenance, and the Monmouth Common Council ordered that it be repaired and upgraded. The castellated parapet had its battlements rebuilt as solid walls, and the roof was raised, producing a two-storey house. In addition, a timber framed lean-to extension was added adjacent to the eastern corner of the gate. While the gatehouse had been converted to a dwelling, a portion of it or the adjacent lean-to was utilised as a lock-up or guardroom when needed. The lean-to was demolished in 1815. In the early and mid 19th century, smaller pedestrian side arches were cut through the flanking towers, the upstream arch in 1819 and the downstream arch in 1845. In 1832, the gatehouse roof was rebuilt.

Monnow Bridge served as an outer defence on the west, and provided access between the suburb of Overmonnow and Monnow Street, which led to Monmouth Castle and market. The gatehouse was last fortified and occupied by soldiers in 1839 at the time of threatened attacks by the Chartists from Newport, an event which did not materialise. In March 2004, a new bridge was opened downstream of Monnow Bridge; on that same day, the old bridge was pedestrianised, such that there is only pedestrian traffic through the Monnow Bridge Gatehouse. The changes improved traffic flow on Monnow Street. Monnow Bridge is now the only surviving medieval fortified bridge in Britain with a gatehouse which is positioned on the bridge.

== Remainder including East Gate ==
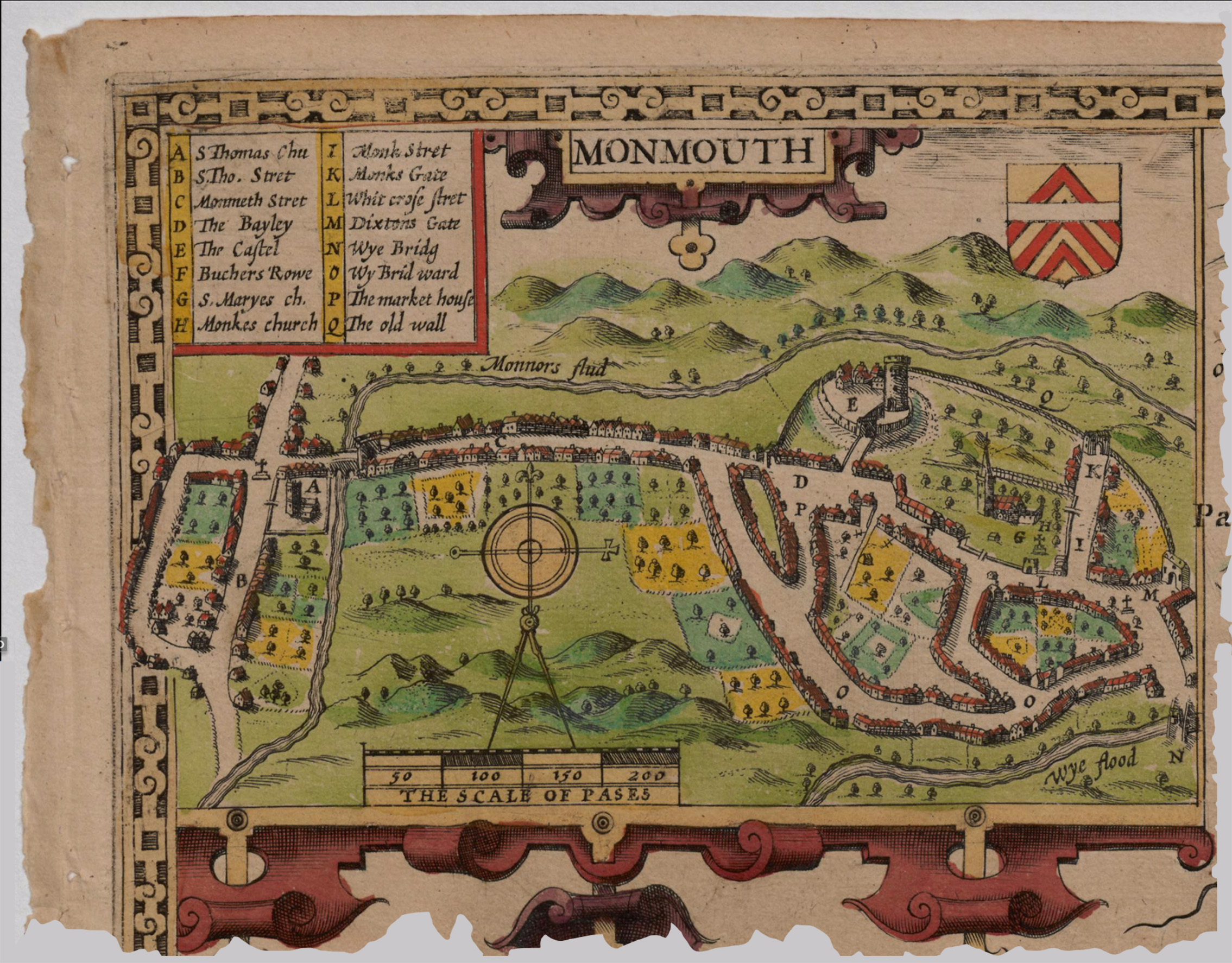
1610 map of Monmouth, Wales by cartographer John Speed

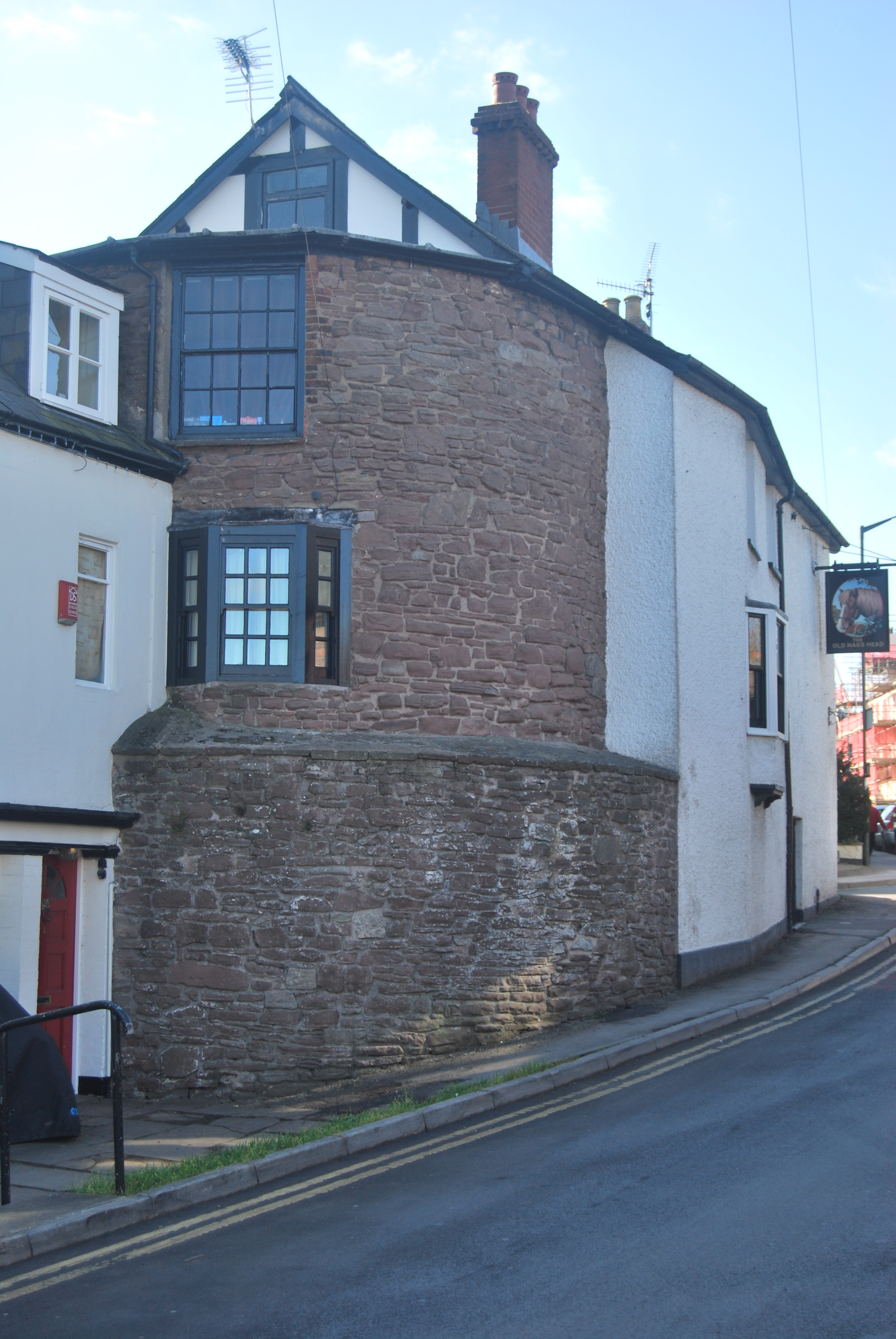
Remnant of Dixton Gate tower, also a portion of the Monmouth town walls and defences

The Monmouth town walls and defences are listed with Cadw and also have records with the Glamorgan-Gwent Archaeological Trust. The Monnow Bridge Gatehouse, part of the town walls and defences, is listed separately due to its particular interest. Aside from the tower which is incorporated into the Old Nag's Head pub, there are no other surviving upstanding remains of the Monmouth town walls. Despite this, archaeological excavations have determined portions of the circuit of the town's defences.

The gates of the Monmouth town walls survived the walls themselves. However, Monk's Gate, near the Priory, was removed in 1710; it is feasible that the curved wall at the Masonic Hall entrance indicates its previous location. Wye Gate at Wye Bridge is also gone. An 1886 article in Archaeologia Cambrensis by William Bagnall-Oakeley, husband of antiquarian Mary Ellen Bagnall-Oakeley, discussed Monmouth and included an analysis of the 1610 map of Monmouth by cartographer John Speed, comparing it with the account of the circa 1538 visit by antiquarian John Leland, also Leyland. Bagnall-Oakeley described Leland's account of a town wall with four gates, Wye, East, Monk's, and Monnow, with a wall that extended to the River Monnow, as incorrect. Instead, Bagnall-Oakeley referred to Speed's map which apparently demonstrated a town wall which ended at the top of Monnow Street, near the Bayley (bailey). The author indicated that Speed referred to the gate at the top of Monnow Street as the West Gate, although there is no label to that effect on the map. Rather, the gate on Speed's map apparently represented St Stephen's Gate. The author indicated that there had been remains of a gate at that position "a few years" previously, which had been used as a gaol. Bagnall-Oakeley felt that the gate was St Stephen's Gate and that it provided access from the town to the outer bailey of Monmouth Castle. Based on his examination of the area with another Monmouth resident and his reading of military accounts, the author speculated that there might have been an additional, sixth gate, lower down on Monnow Street, expressing some disagreement with both Leland and Speed. That sixth gate, the West Gate, may be the one referred to by author William Meyler Warlow. He indicated that the medieval town wall ran from the River Monnow, in the vicinity of the Priory Mill, across Monnow Street, just above the level of Nailers Lane. That there was a gate with a drawbridge over a ditch at that level is confirmed by the Glamorgan-Gwent Archaeological Trust Historic Environment Record.

Most of the East Gate, also known as Dixton Gate, was removed in 1770 because it prevented the passage of coaches. Aside from the Monnow Bridge Gatehouse which is given a separate listing as a scheduled monument due to its special interest, the only standing remnant of the Monmouth town walls and defences is the medieval Dixton Gate tower which was incorporated into the Old Nag's Head public house. The lower storey of the gate tower is older and has a battered base; the upper storey of the red sandstone tower has 19th century work. The red sandstone tower of the East Gate, part of Monmouth's defences, is on Old Dixton Road. The Old Nag's Head Public House is also a listed building of Grade II*. The building was given a higher grade due to its interest not only in its own right, but also because of the incorporation of a significant portion of the gate tower. In February 2012, proposed renovation of the building adjoining the medieval East Gate led to the recommendation of an archaeological field evaluation.

== Rivers ==
The town of Monmouth is nestled between the River Monnow and the River Wye, just northwest of their confluence. The name of the town was derived from its location at the junction of the two rivers. Monmouth is the contraction of Monnow and mouth. The Welsh name for the river, Mynwy, which may originally have meant "fast-flowing", was anglicised as Monnow. The town was originally known in Welsh as Abermynwy ("mouth of the Monnow"), replaced by Trefynwy ("Monnow town" – the initial m of Mynwy mutating in Welsh to f) by the 17th century.

The natural defences afforded by the Monnow and the Wye in conjunction with constructed Monmouth town walls and defences provided protection to the town. William Bagnall-Oakeley, again in reference to Speed's map, described a rampart and fosse (defensive wall and ditch) which extended from the top of Monnow Street behind the houses in a line to the River Wye, then turning to the Wye Gate. The rampart and fosse then extended to Dixton Gate and, from there, to Monk's Gate and the bank of the River Monnow. After circling around the castle, it joined again at the top of Monnow Street. Thus, while the entire circuit of the walls is not known, the walls and ditches were constructed in close association with the rivers. In addition, Clawdd-du, the defensive ditch which surrounded the Monmouth suburb of Overmonnow, provided further fortification of the area. However, as the Monnow River was fairly shallow and narrow, it could be crossed easily upstream. Therefore, while the Monnow Bridge and Gate were built mainly for defensive purposes, ultimately their primary function was financial; they were utilised to collect tolls.

== See also ==
- Clawdd-du
- List of town walls in England and Wales
