= Monmouth War Memorial =

War memorial in Monmouth, Wales

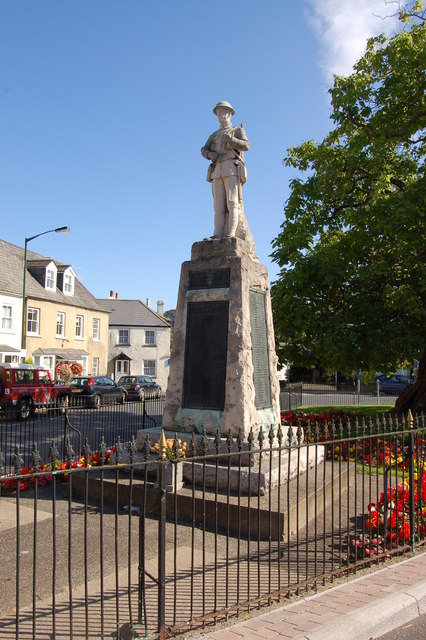
- Monmouth War Memorial on St. James' Square in Monmouth, Monmouthshire, Wales
- Interactive map of Monmouth War Memorial

Details
- Established: 1921
- Location: Monmouth, Monmouthshire
- Country: Wales
- Coordinates: 51°48′47″N 2°42′40″W
- Type: military

The Monmouth War Memorial commemorates the inhabitants of the town of Monmouth, Wales who died in the First and Second World Wars.

== Location ==
The Monmouth War Memorial is located in Monmouth, Monmouthshire, Wales. It is positioned in the centre of St. James' Square, within the roundabout of Whitecross Street, Old Dixton Road, and St. James' Street. The Catalpa tree behind the cenotaph was imported from North America and planted about 1900. At the time of the unveiling of the monument in 1921, the Catalpa was already a mature tree. There are formal plantings on three sides of the memorial. The monument, plantings, and adjacent lawn are surrounded by railings. The Indian Bean Tree, however, was condemned by the Monmouthshire City Council. Opponents of the decision to fell the tree hired a professional arboriculturalist who concluded that the tree could be treated to extend its life.

== Unveiling ==
The memorial was unveiled on 6 October 1921. Former soldiers J. Jenkins and J. Pembridge sounded the "Last Post" following the unveiling, which was done by Major Reade DSO MC, headmaster of Monmouth School. Also present was the Mayor, A. T. Blake, Cannon Harding, A. E. Monahan, Vicar of Monmouth, and Major A. C. Tweedy, the town clerk.

== Description ==
The Monmouth War Memorial was created by W. Clarke, a sculptor from Llandaff, Cardiff. The war monument is composed of a three-step base and column, upon which there is the figure of a soldier. The column has multiple metal plaques, including two on the front. The upper, smaller plaque indicates that the monument commemorates the residents of Monmouth who died in both World War I and World War II. It reads: "To the memory of the Monmouth men who fell in the wars 1914–1918 1939–1945." The lower, larger plaque on the front of the monument lists the deceased Monmouth soldiers of the Second World War, 1939 to 1945.

== Historic designation ==
The war memorial is on the Statutory List of Buildings of Special Architectural or Historic Interest in the United Kingdom. It was listed as a Grade II structure on 8 October 2005. Such structures are considered to be "nationally important and of special interest." Ninety-two percent of listed buildings are of this grade. The monument's record is in the collection of the Royal Commission on the Ancient and Historical Monuments of Wales. The Cadw Building ID Number for the Monmouth War Memorial is 85239. Cadw is the historic environment service for the government of Wales. The Welsh term "cadw" means to keep or protect.
