= Monk Street, Monmouth =

Street in Monmouth, Wales

Monk Street
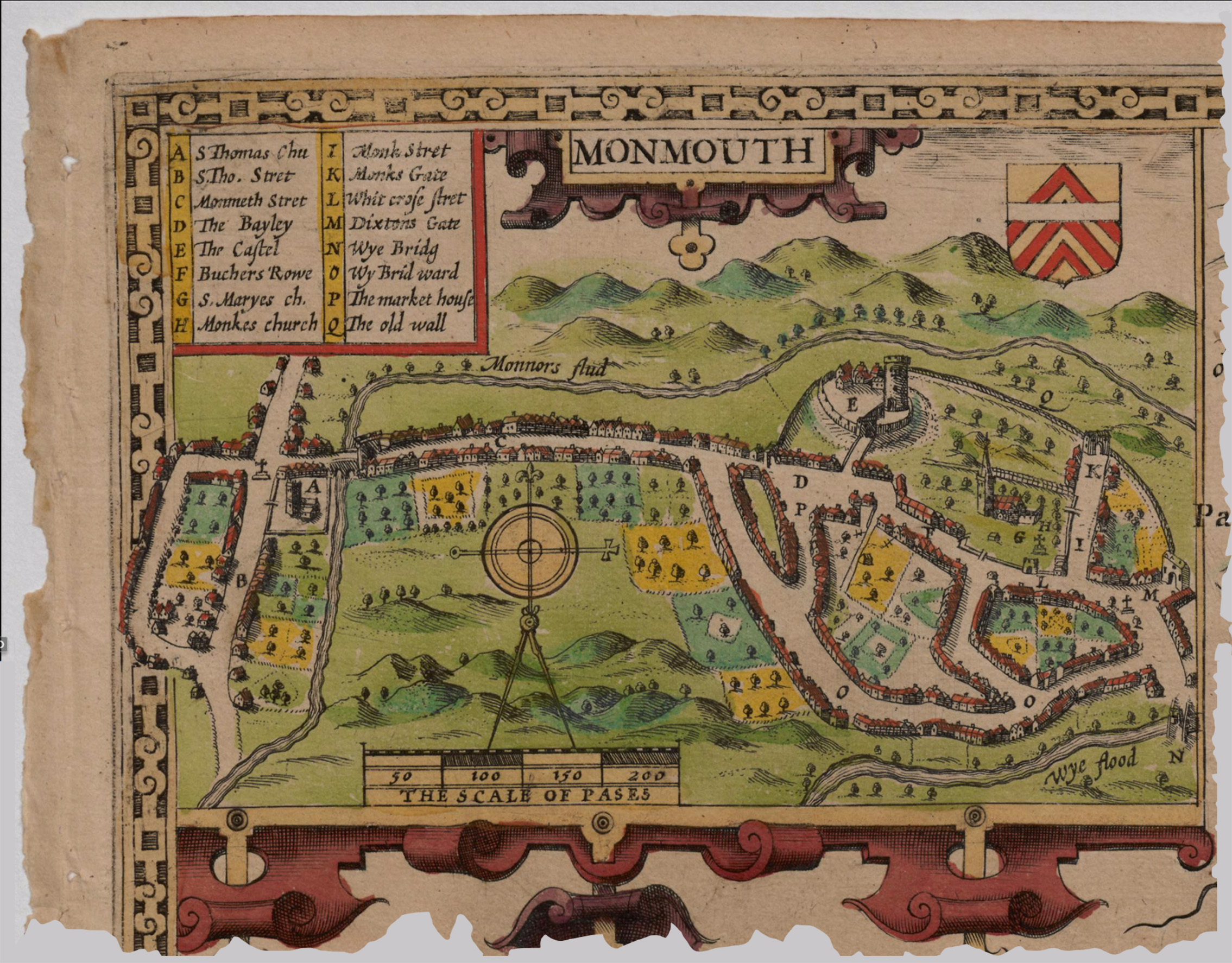
- Cartographer John Speed's 1610 Map of Monmouth, Monmouthshire, Wales demonstrates Monk Street
- Interactive map of Monk Street
- Location: Monmouth, Wales
- Coordinates: 51.813725°N 2.712778°W
- South end: Whitecross Street

Monk Street is an historic street in the town of Monmouth, Monmouthshire, Wales. A portion of it was in existence by the 14th century, and appears on the 1610 map of the town by cartographer John Speed. It runs in a north-south direction, extending northward from its intersection with Whitecross Street. The name of the street relates to the nearby Priory, as well as the gate which was originally on this road and provided part of the town's defences, Monk's Gate. Monk Street is lined with numerous listed buildings.

== History and location ==
By the 14th century, a portion of the street plan of Monmouth had been determined. It is believed that Monk Street derived its name from the nearby Priory. On the map of the town of Monmouth (pictured) created by John Speed in 1610, Monk Street extends from its intersection with Whitecross Street northward to Monk's Gate. Monk's Gate was a component of the town's defences. While the gates of the town outlasted the walls themselves, Monk's Gate was removed in 1710. The curved wall at the Masonic Hall entrance may indicate its previous location. On current maps, Monk Street extends northward from Whitecross Street to the intersection with Priory Street on the west and New Dixton Road on the east. Priory Street was designed by architect George Vaughan Maddox and built in the 1830s as a bypass to reduce carriage traffic in Church Street, which was eventually pedestrianized. Monk Street continues northward beyond the intersection, although in some maps or texts the segment past the intersection is referred to as The Parade or North Parade. In addition, on some modern maps, the eastern leg of Whitecross Street, from the intersection with Monk Street to its termination at the roundabout encircling St James' Square, is also referred to as St James' Square, such that some buildings on Whitecross Street have two addresses.

== Buildings ==
1 Monk Street (pictured below), the former Working Men's Free Institute, is a grade II listed building. It was built by Newport architect Benjamin Lawrence and has a facade of Old Red Sandstone and Bath Stone trim. It is located next to Monmouth Baptist Church, also built by Lawrence. It now houses an art gallery and shop.

The Monmouth Baptist Church (pictured below) at 3 Monk Street is an early-20th-century, grade II listed building. Also referred to as the Baptist Chapel, it was designed by Newport architect Benjamin Lawrence. The chapel was built in the Gothic style in 1906–1907. The two-storey building features a Welsh slate roof, red sandstone walls, and an octagonal bell tower. It is located on the east side of Monk Street, opposite St. Mary's Church.

5 Monk Street is a listed building.

The Royal George Hotel (pictured below), on Monk Street, is an early-18th-century, grade II* listed building. Also referred to as the Ivy Bank House or Ivy Bank Hotel, the building features Corinthian pillars and a hipped slate roof. It was built in the 1730s and converted to apartments in the 1970s. It is located across the road from the Oak House.

Oak House (pictured below) at 6 Monk Street is a 19th-century, grade II listed building. It was built in the 1840s by architect by George Vaughan Maddox. The three-storey house has three bays along the entrance elevation on Monk Street, while the north elevation along Priory Street has four bays. There is a hipped slate roof with two chimneys. It now serves as the Telephone Exchange and is located opposite the Royal George.

7 Monk Street, on the east side of the road, is also referred to as Ty Mawr. It is an early-19th-century, three-story, grade II listed building with a stucco exterior.

Kingsley House and Hendre House (pictured below) at 8 Monk Street and 10 Monk Street are a pair of semi-detached dwellings. The complex is an early-19th-century, grade II listed building. The three-storey, five-bay house has a hipped slate roof. The entrance has a six panelled door with a fanlight. The stucco facade is notable for its blocked central windows. The building is the work of architect George Vaughan Maddox.

9 Monk Street is an early-19th-century, grade II listed building. Also referred to as Sanroyd House, it is a 3-storey building with a stucco exterior and slate roof.

The Masonic Hall (pictured below) was converted from a theatre by George Vaughan Maddox in 1846. The previous Monk Street Theatre had occupied its Georgian building from 1838 to 1844. A curved wall adjacent to the entrance of the Masonic Hall is thought to be indicative of the site of a portion of Monk's Gate. The 19th-century, grade II listed building is on the west side of the road.

11 Monk Street has two listings in the records maintained in the collection of the Royal Commission on the Ancient and Historical Monuments of Wales. In one, there is reference to a coach house, which is a listed building. 11 Monk Street, the second listing for this address, is also referred to as Fitzroy House and The Gatehouse(s). It is a three-storey, early-19th-century, grade II listed building. It is north of New Dixton Road on the east side. The entrance features large Greek Doric columns.

Cadogan House at 12 Monk Street is an early-19th-century, listed building. The three-storey house has a slate roof. Cadogan House is remarkable as the site of discovery of a 15th-century kiln which produced floor and roof tiles.

13 Monk Street is a listed building of uncertain date. The three-storey, single-bay house has a painted exterior and slate roof. The ground and middle floors each have a two light window. The topmost floor has a six plus six window akin to a weaver's window.

14 Monk Street is an early-19th-century, listed building. The Regency style house has a slate roof.

16 and 18 Monk Street represent a single building with two doors. Also referred to as Stoneleigh, it is an early-19th-century, four-storey, three window, listed building.

Singleton House at 20 Monk Street is an early-19th-century, listed building. The three-storey, three-bay house has a central entry. The ground and middle floors have a recessed arch at the centre. The ground floor windows are also in recessed arches. The entrance has a six panelled door with fanlight. The roof is of Welsh slate and there are two chimneys. Wrought iron railings are present, as well as a trellis porch. The late Georgian building was listed due to its special architectural interest.

Chapel House (pictured below) on the west side of Monk Street, at the level of the Parade, is an 18th-century, grade II* listed building. It is a seven-bay house, the central three having narrow windows. Praised by author John Newman as "the best house in the entire street," its interior features a central hall with a wreathed plaster ceiling and a staircase reminiscent of that at Troy House.

Parade House (pictured below) on the Parade is an 18th-century, grade II listed building. The Georgian house was originally an inn. The three-storey building has a hipped slate roof.

North Parade House (pictured below) at 12 North Parade is a late-18th-century, grade II listed building. It is also located on the Parade or North Parade, the segment of Monk Street north of New Dixton Road and Priory Street. The three-storey, three-bay house has a Welsh slate roof. The entrance features a radiating fanlight. The back of the property is remarkable for a large walled garden. The property was at one point the home of a wool merchant. The garage was formerly his warehouse, and the four adjacent cottages (pictured below) had provided housing for his workers. The house is located opposite the gatehouse of the Monmouth County Gaol.

The Monmouth County Gaol (pictured below), or The Old Gaol, is a listed building. It was designed by William Blackburn and built 1788–1790. It closed in 1869 due to the increase in size of the gaol in Usk. Constructed of Old Red Sandstone, the current house is the surviving remnant of the County Gaol, and was its gatehouse. It is located opposite the North Parade House.

The former Cottage Hospital (pictured below) is an early-20th-century, listed building. It was designed by London architect Richard Creed and built in 1902. It was built on the site of the former gaol. It also has a Hereford Road address.

== Gallery ==
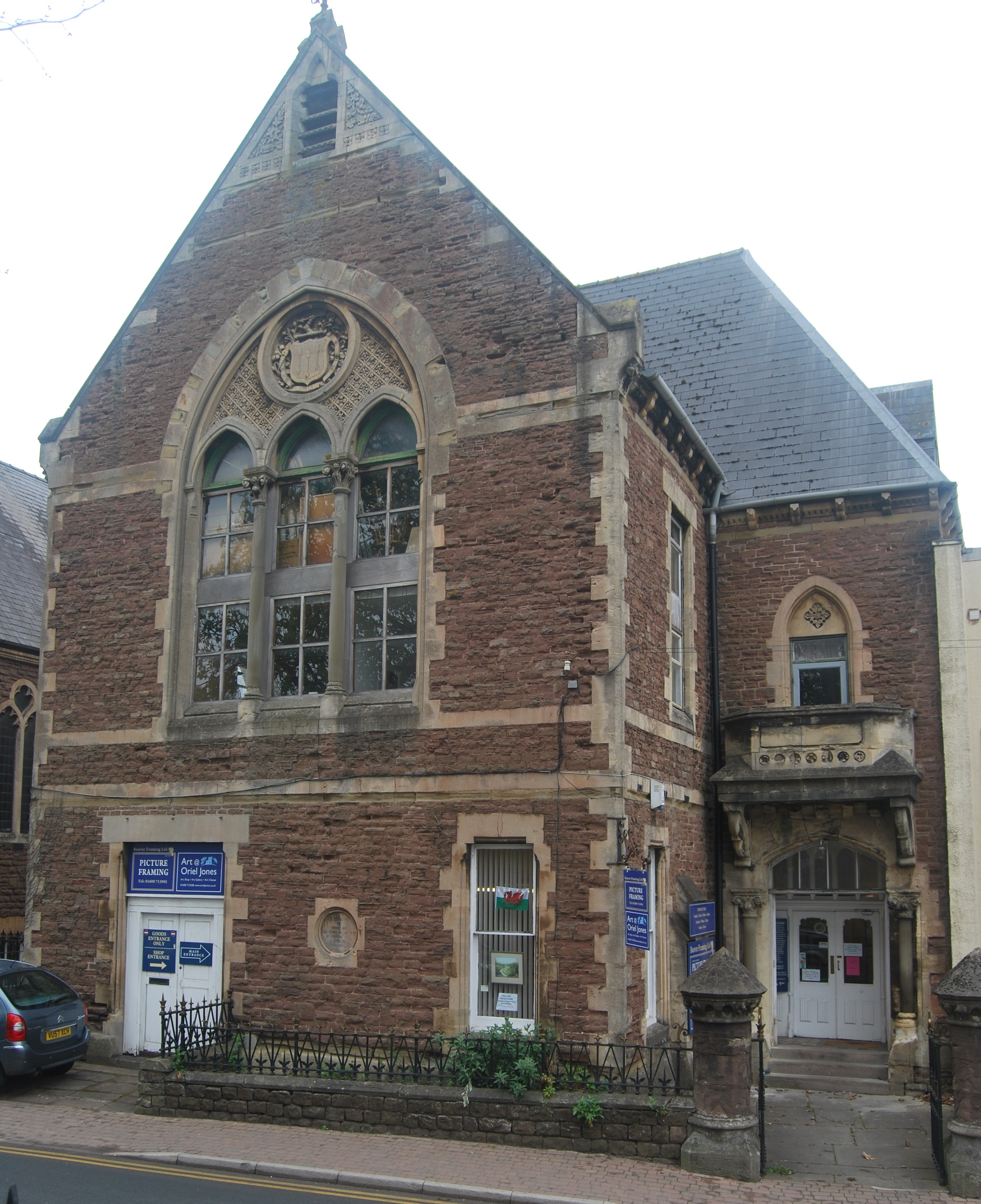
1 Monk Street

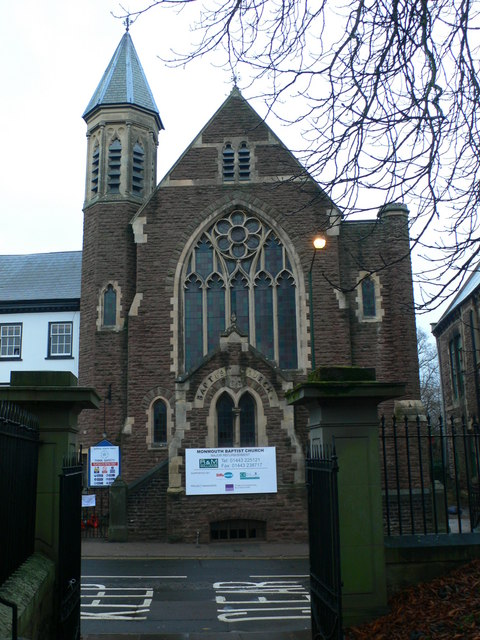
Monmouth Baptist Church

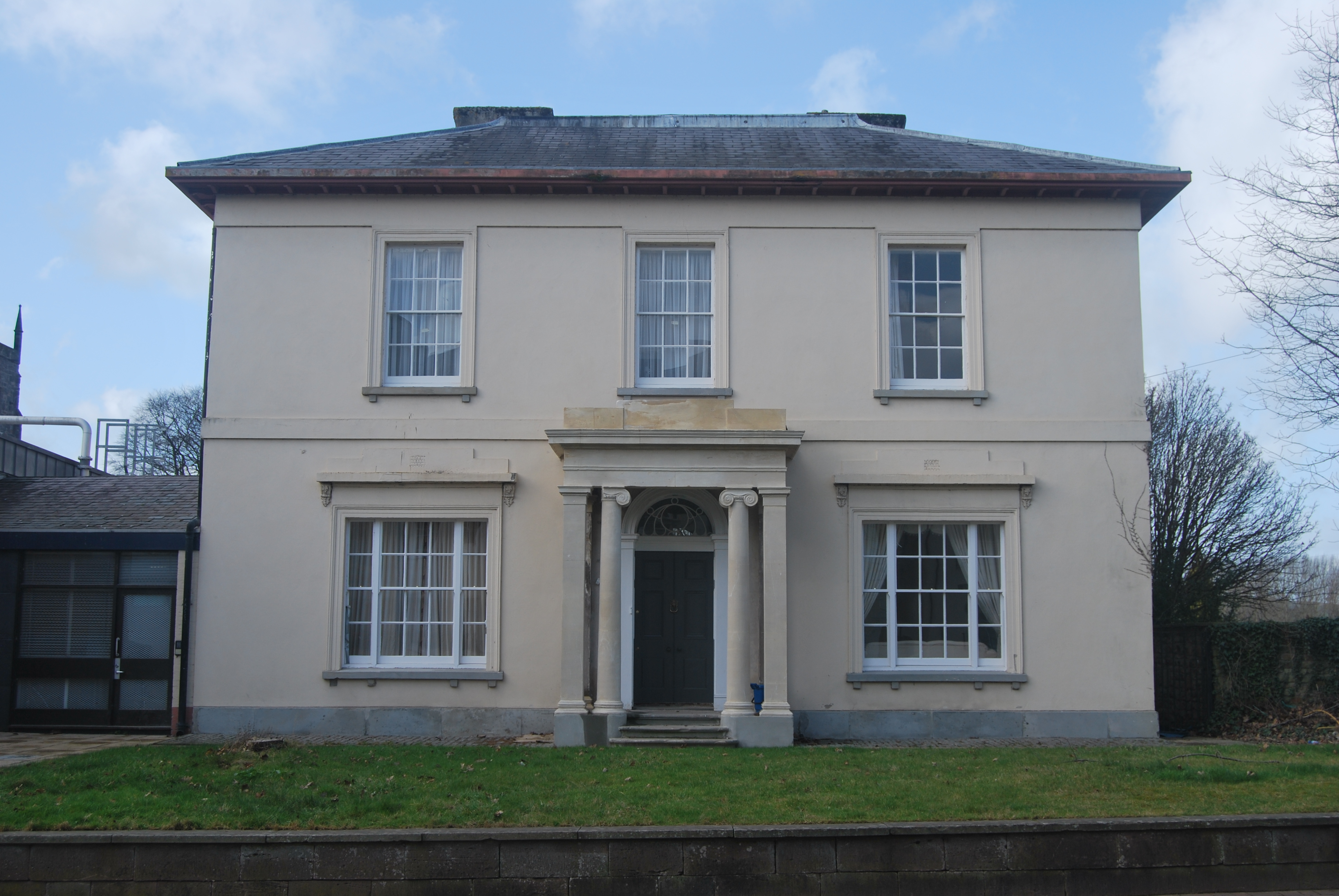
Oak House

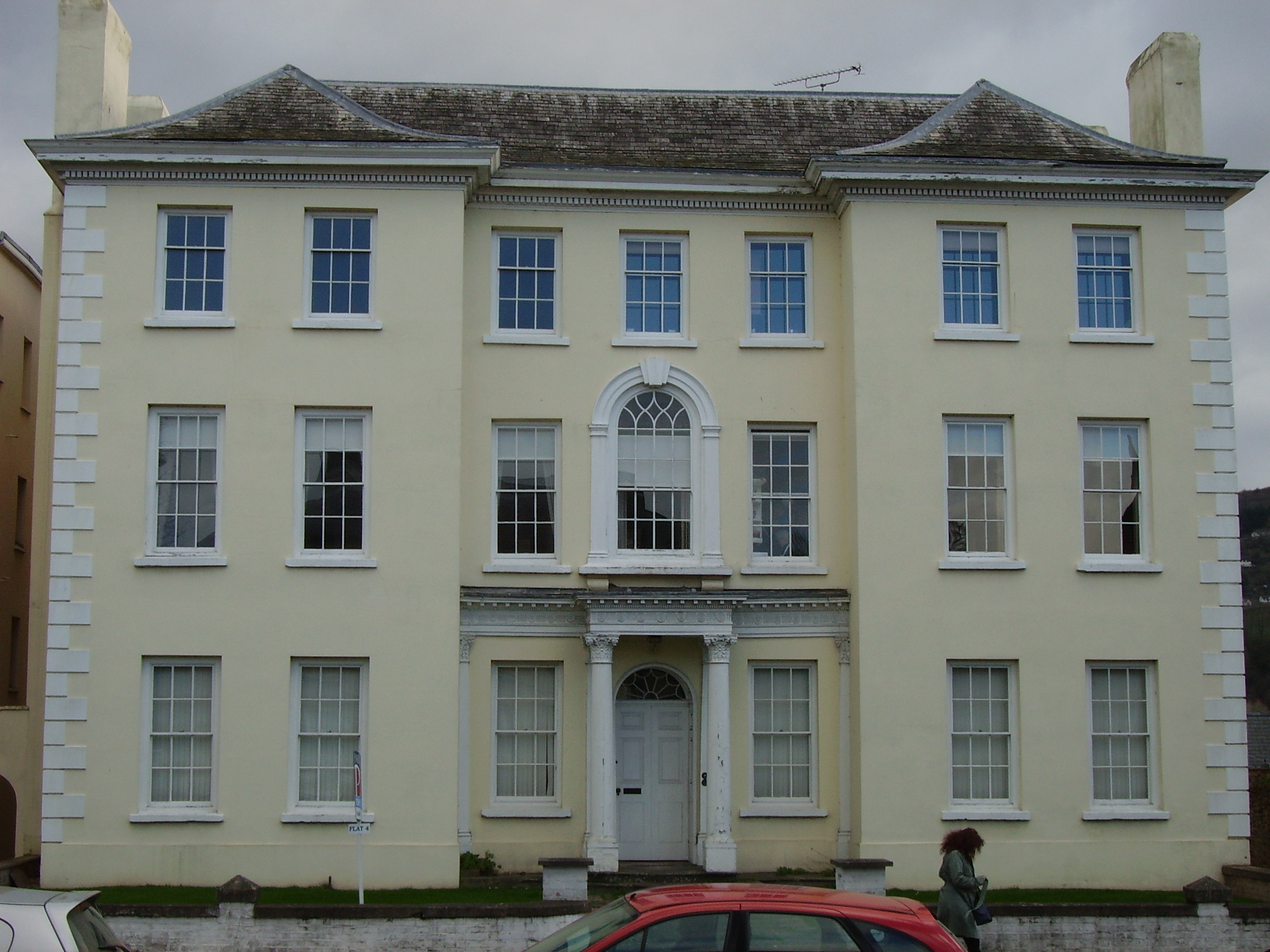
Royal George Hotel

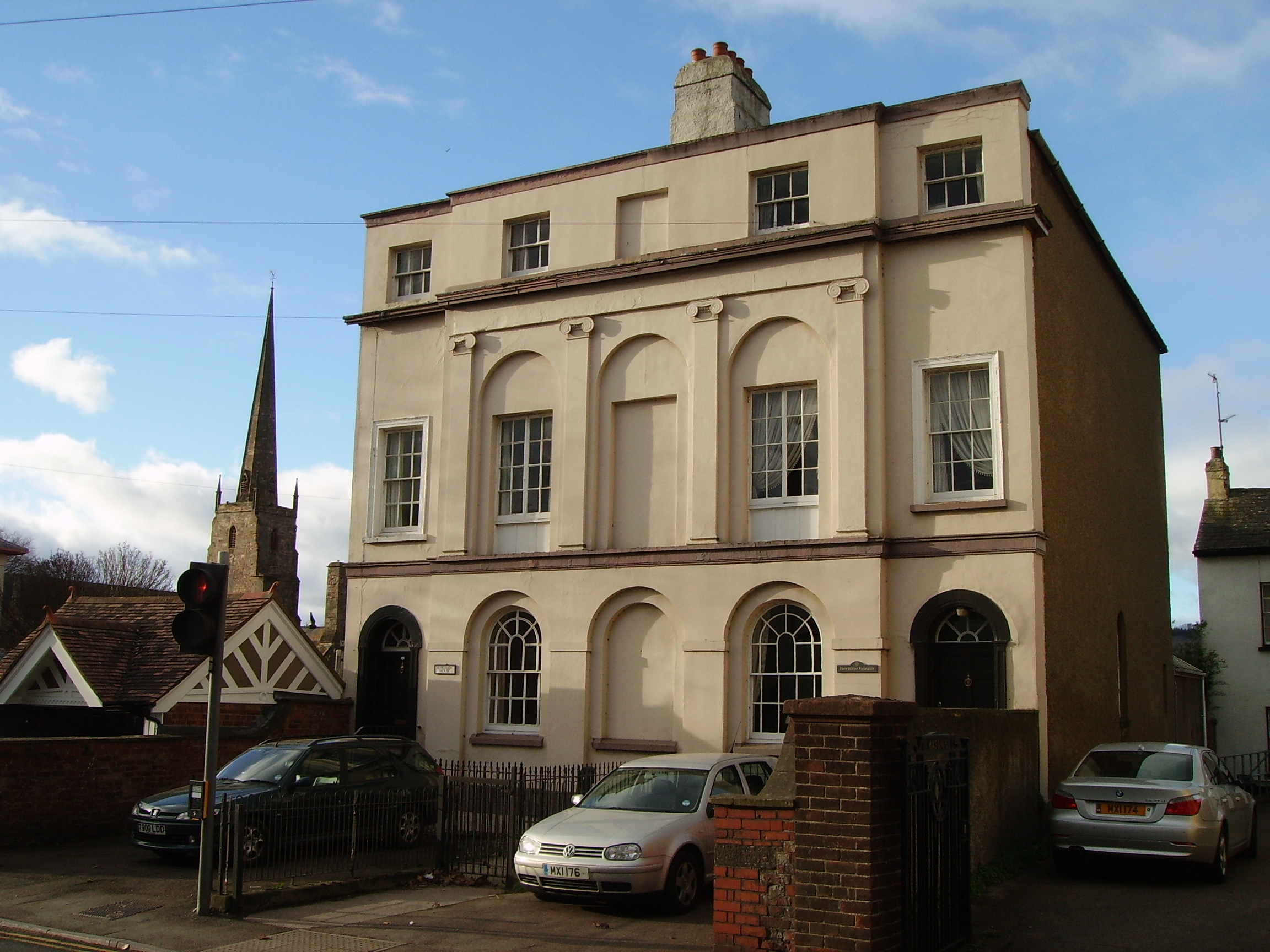
Kingsley House and Hendre House

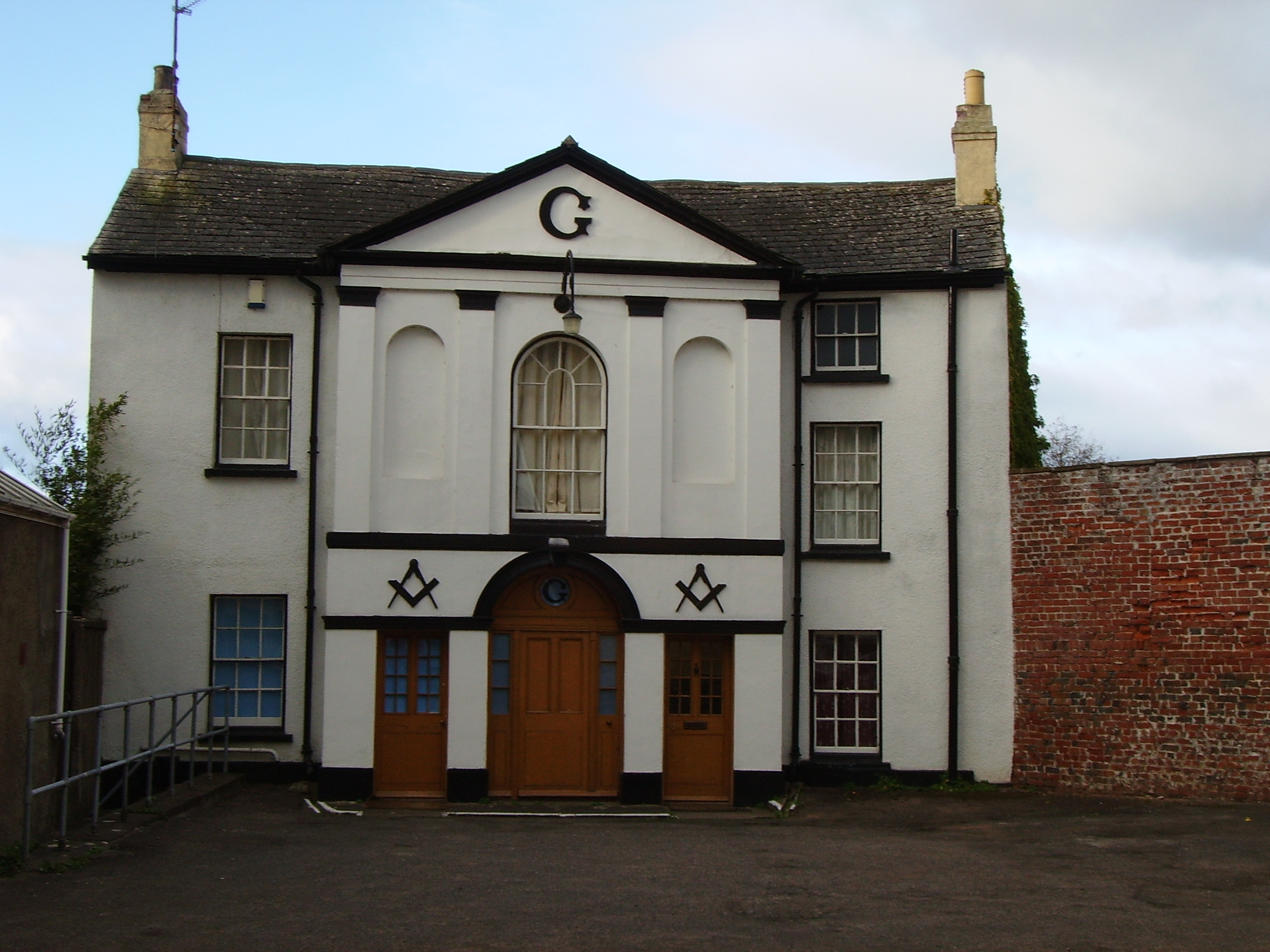
Masonic Hall

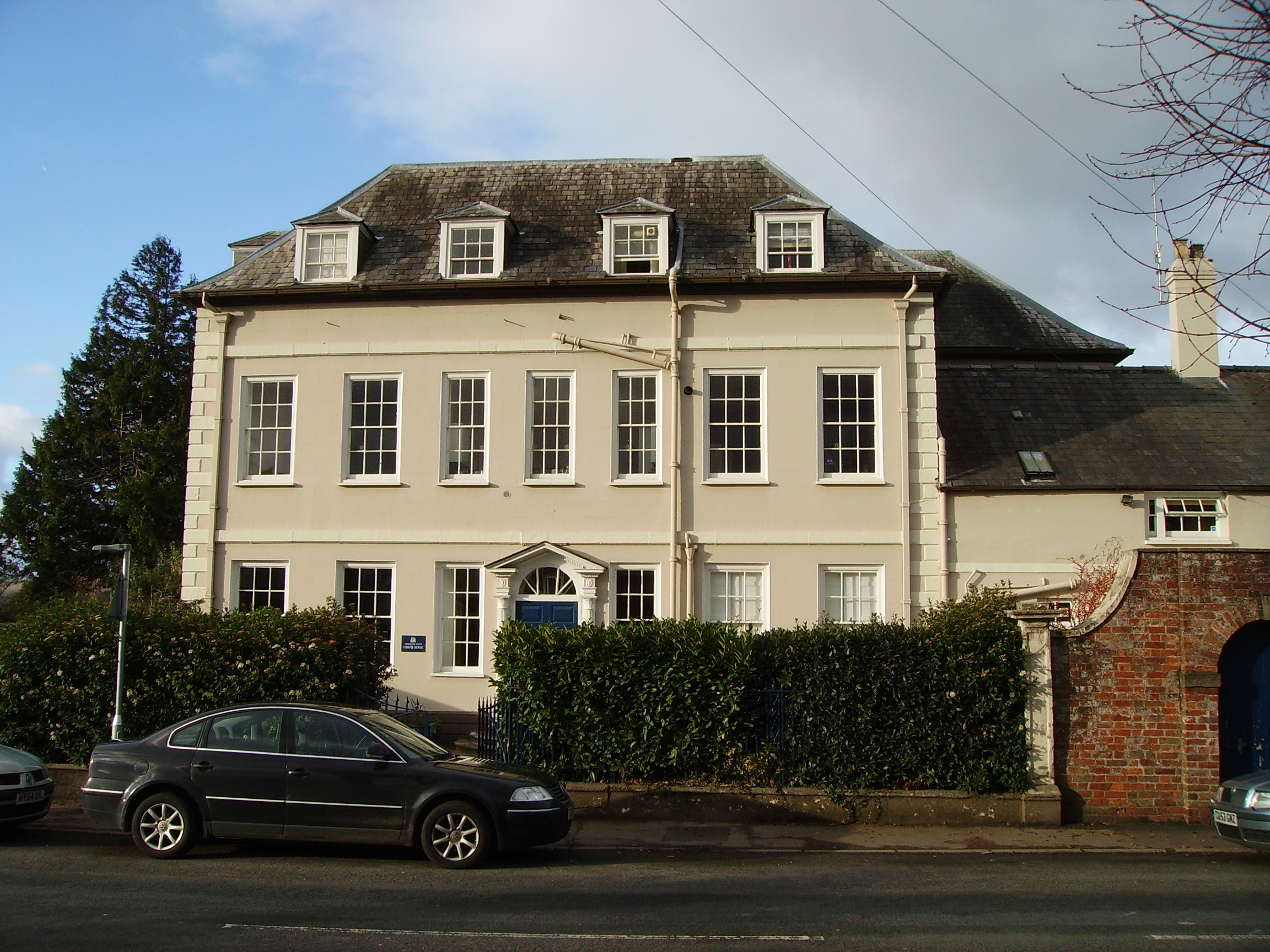
Chapel House

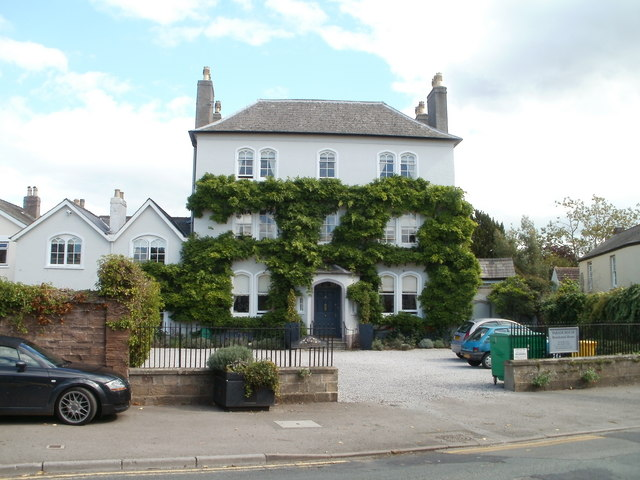
Parade House

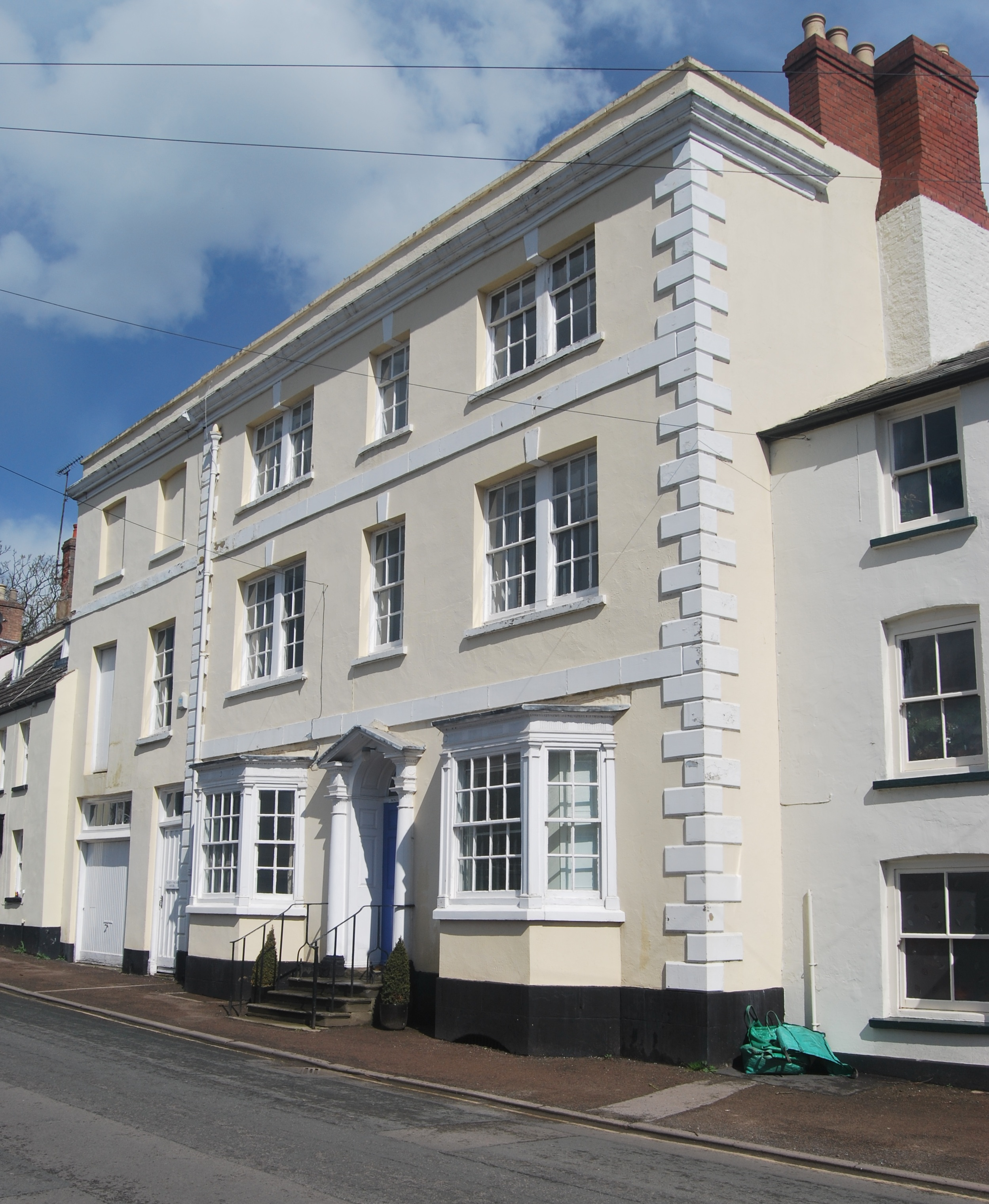
North Parade House

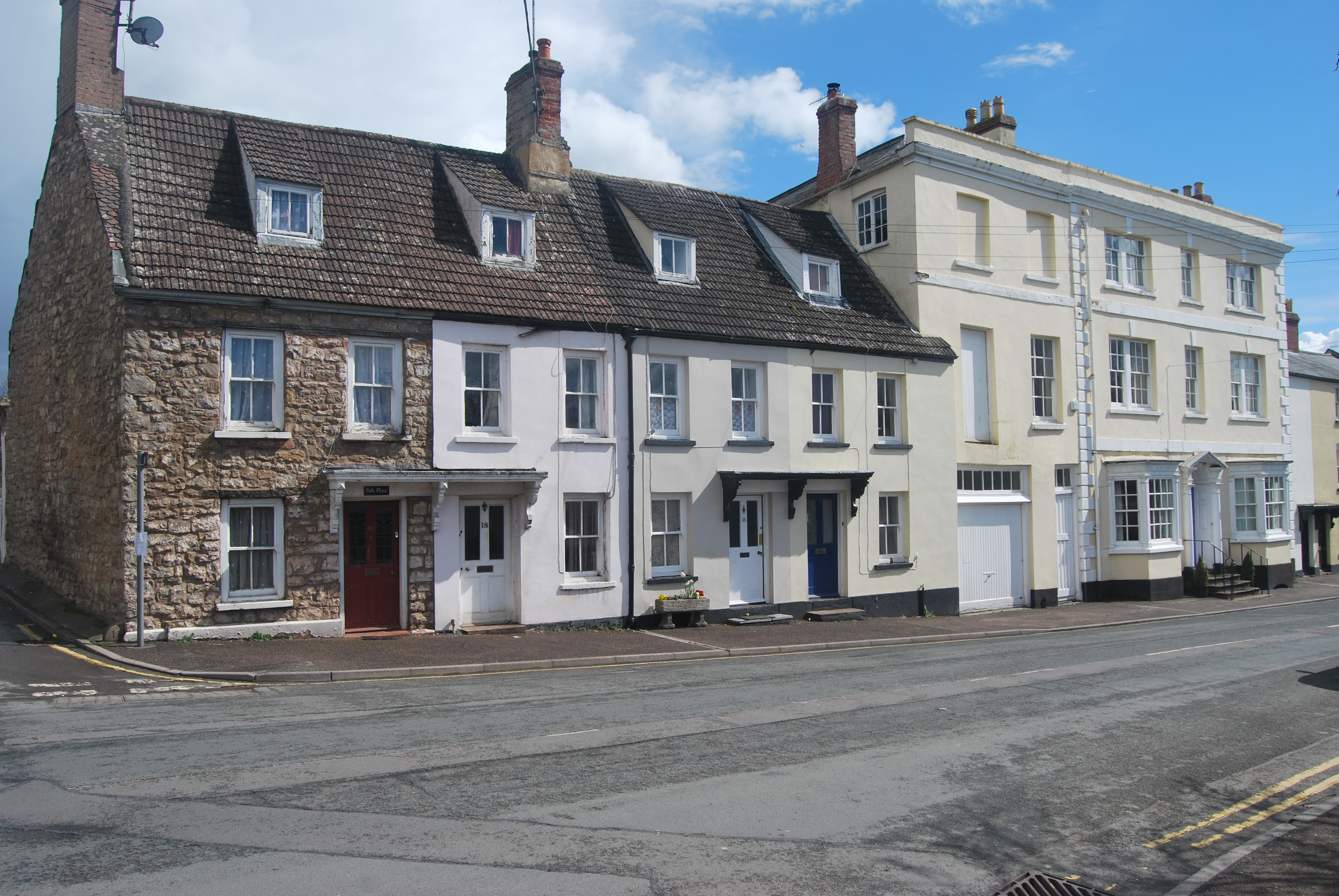
North Parade Cottages

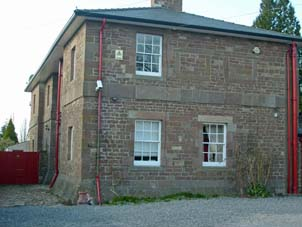
Monmouth County Gaol

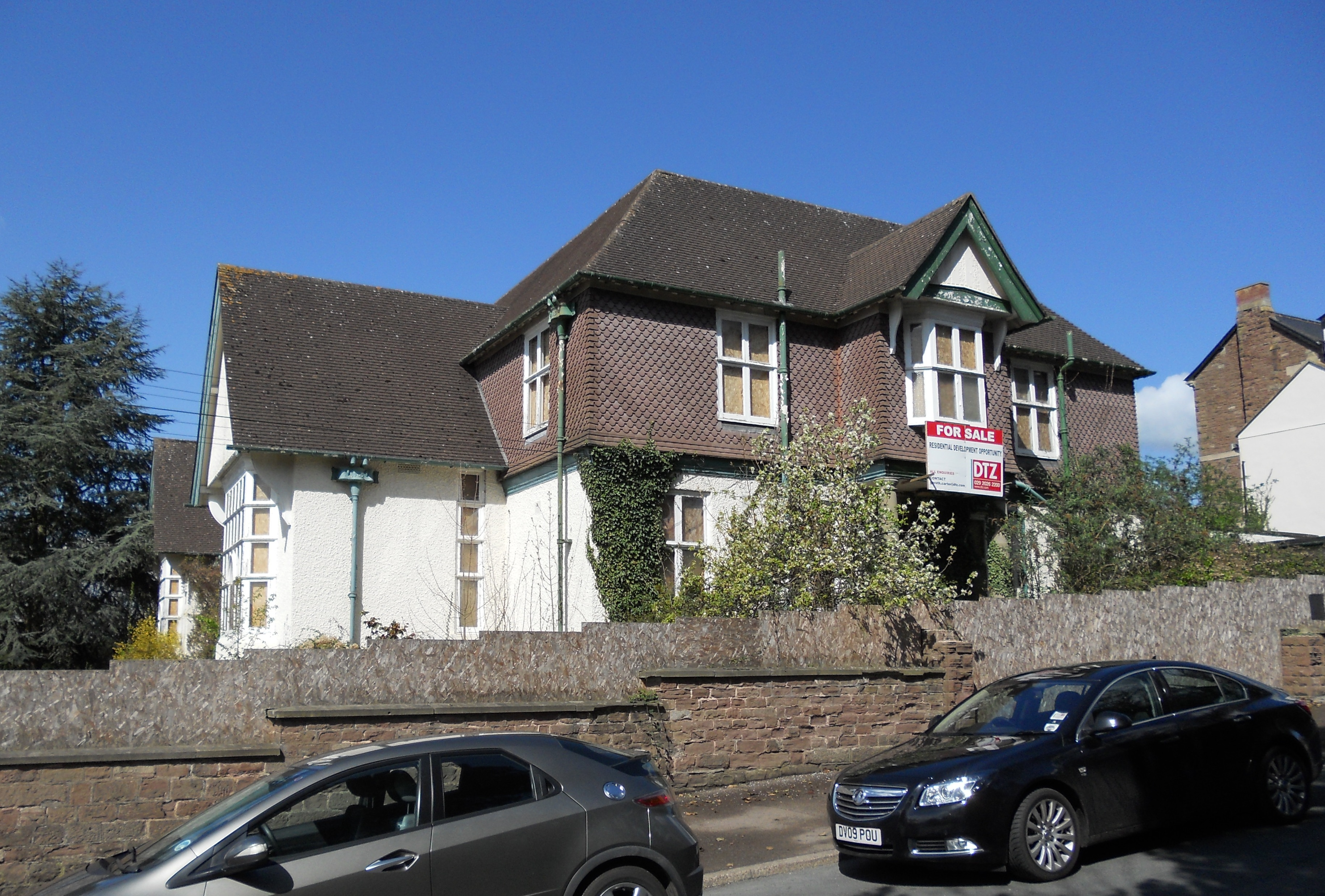
Cottage Hospital
