= Parade (disambiguation) =

A parade is a procession of people.

Parade or The Parade may also refer to:

== Arts, entertainment, and media ==
=== Films ===
- Parade (1974 film), film by Jacques Tati
- Parade (2009 film), Japanese film starring Tatsuya Fujiwara
- Parades, a 1972 film starring David Doyle
- The Parade (film), a 2011 Serbian film

=== Music ===
==== Groups and labels ====
- Parade (band), a British girl group
- The Parade (band), an American soft rock group from LA. Hit "Sunshine Girl"(1967)
- Parade, Italian record label founded by Ennio Morricone

==== Albums ====
- Parade (Ron Carter album), 1979
- Parade (Minori Chihara album), 2008
- Parade (GO!GO!7188 album), 2006
- Parade (Plastic Tree album), 2000
- Parade (Prince album), 1986
  - Parade Tour (Prince), a 1986 tour in support of the Prince album
- Parade (Parade album), 2011
- Parade (Spandau Ballet album), 1984
- Parade (Deen album), 2017
- Parade -Respective Tracks of Buck-Tick-, a 2005 Buck-Tick tribute album
- Parade II -Respective Tracks of Buck-Tick-, a 2012 Buck-Tick tribute album
- Parades (Efterklang album), 2007
- Parade, a 2006 album by Barbie Almalbis

==== Songs ====
- "Parade" (Dev song), 2015
- "Parade", a song by Bedhead from the album Transaction de Novo
- "Parade", a song by Roger Daltrey from One of the Boys
- "Parade", a song by Magazine from their 1978 album Real Life
- "Parade", a song by Matchbox Twenty from the album North
- "Parade", a song by Parannoul from the album After the Magic
- "Parade", a song by Stray Kids from the EP Hollow
- "Parade", a song by Tyler the Creator from the album Bastard
- "Parade", a song by Univers Zero from the album Uzed

=== Musicals ===
- Parade (musical), a 1998 musical with a score by Jason Robert Brown and book by Alfred Uhry
- Parade, a 1935 musical revue by Jerome Moross
- Parade (revue), an Off-Broadway revue by Jerry Herman
- Parade (Paris 2024 Official Musical Theme), the Official Musical Theme of the Paris 2024 Olympic and Paralympic Games, composed by Victor le Masne

=== Periodicals ===
- Parade (British magazine), a British magazine for men
- Parade (magazine), an American nationwide Sunday newspaper magazine

=== Television ===
- "Parade" (Bottom), an episode of the British television sitcom Bottom
- Parade (TV series), Canadian music variety television series which aired from 1959 to 1964
- Parade Parade, a 1996 Japanese original video animation series

=== Other uses in arts, entertainment, and media ===
- Parade (ballet), a 1916–17 ballet with music by Erik Satie and a one-act scenario by Jean Cocteau
- Parade (French street entertainment), a type of entertainment which originated during the Renaissance
- Parade Theatre, Sydney, Australia
- Parade (novel), a 2024 novel by Rachel Cusk

== Places ==
- Parade, South Dakota, a community in the United States
- Parade Square (Plac Defilad w Warszawie), a square in downtown Warsaw
- The Parade, Adelaide
- Parade, Leamington Spa, Warwickshire, England

== Other uses ==
- Military parade
- Parade College, an Australian Roman Catholic all-boys high school
- Parade (company), an underwear brand founded in 2019
- Parade House, Monmouth, a building in Monmouth, Wales
- Parade Park Maintenance Building, a building in Kansas City, Missouri from 1912
- Shopping parade, a group of shops, primarily suburban and in the UK
- Parading (horse), a racehorse

== See also ==
- Hit Parade (disambiguation)
- The Big Parade (disambiguation)
