= Crown and Thistle Inn, Monmouth =

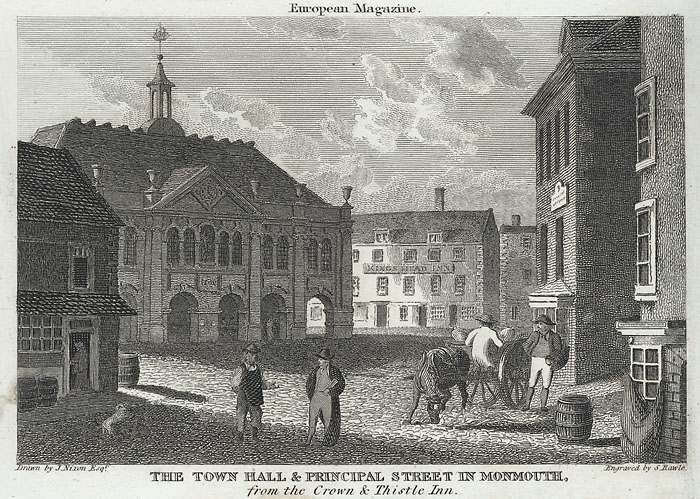
- The Shire Hall and Agincourt Square, from the Crown and Thistle Inn
- Interactive map of the Crown and Thistle Inn, Monmouth area

General information
- Type: Public House
- Location: Agincourt Square, Monmouth, Wales
- Coordinates: 51.8122°N 2.7155°W

The Crown and Thistle Inn was a public house in Monmouth, Monmouthshire, Wales. It was in the historic Agincourt Square neighbourhood. Prior to its conversion to a public house, the building served as the premises of an apothecary. During the early nineteenth century, the Crown and Thistle Inn briefly housed one of the earliest Masonic Lodges in Monmouthshire.

== History and location ==
The Crown and Thistle Inn, a public house in Monmouth, was located on the north side of Agincourt Square, near the site of a previous bull ring. The building stood on the ground which is now the entrance to Priory Street. Prior to its use as a public house, the Crown and Thistle Inn had been occupied by an apothecary. The house, located on the bank of the River Monnow, had been the premises for many years of the apothecary, a Mr. Morgan. Later, Morgan's son was the proprietor of the business.

The building was eventually redeveloped as a public house, the Crown and Thistle Inn. During the course of making improvements to the property, a Mr. Powell removed a stone with an attached ring. That area of Agincourt Square was referred to as the Bull Ring. Author Charles Heath indicated that it had been the custom to tie a bull to the ring, and that previous Monmouth residents had availed themselves of a "cruel diversion." Author William Meyler Warlow indicated that the townspeople had "enjoyed the cruel sport of bull-baiting." Dogs were bred to attack a restrained bull around the face, biting and hanging on until exhausted. The practice of bull-baiting was outlawed by the Cruelty to Animals Act 1835.

Mr. Powell was the liquor purveyor at the Crown and Thistle Inn at the time that the improvements to the property were made. Later, in 1804, the proprietor of the inn was a Mr. Barlow. In the mid-nineteenth century, Pigot's Directory of 1844, under the listing of "Taverns & Public Houses," indicated that the proprietor of the Crown and Thistle in Agincourt Square was Charles Edwards.

In his 1804 account of the history of Monmouth, Heath offered his opinion that a visitor to the town would find no better establishment in which to partake of refreshments than the Crown and Thistle Inn, with particular regard to its garden in the summer. He painted a charming picture of the public house's garden, recommending it for its proximity to the sounds of the River Monnow, and its view of the local landscape. A visitor could admire the forests, meadows, and cornfields, his vantage point also permitting an appreciation of the setting sun.

The National Library of Wales contains an 1808 print (pictured), drawn by artist John Nixon (1760-1818) and engraved by Samuel Rawle (1771-1860). The early nineteenth-century, black and white engraving is entitled "The Town Hall & principal street in Monmouth, from the Crown & Thistle Inn." The scene of Agincourt Square includes people, a horse, and a cart in the foreground. Midground, to the left, the Shire Hall is illustrated. Multiple other buildings are demonstrated as well, including the King's Head Inn to the right, in the background.

== Freemasonry at the inn ==
The oldest surviving Masonic Lodge in Monmouthshire is the Loyal Monmouth Lodge No. 457, established in 1839, initially as Lodge No. 671. The lodge still has its meetings in Monmouth, at Monk Street's Masonic Hall, the first building in Monmouthshire to be utilized mainly for Masonic purposes. However, one of the earliest Masonic Lodges in Monmouthshire had its meetings at the Crown and Thistle Inn, but the lodge didn't survive. This appears to represent the same lodge mentioned in a September 2000 lecture given by Andrew Prescott of the Centre for Research into Freemasonry. On 2 January 1815, Royal Augustus Lodge No. 656 received its warrant to assemble at the Crown and Thistle Inn. On 22 April 1815, the Monmouth lodge was consecrated. Trevor Philpotts was Master of the lodge during most of the time that it existed. The door to the room in the upper level of the Crown and Thistle Inn that was utilized for early lodge meetings was embellished with Masonic symbols that were still visible in the 1920s. The Freemason of 13 August 1892 reported that the Royal Augustus Lodge No. 656 was created in 1814 at the Crown and Thistle Inn and disbanded in 1830. Another record confirms the 1815 dates for the lodge and indicates that it transferred to the King's Head Inn in 1816. The Royal Augustus Lodge was removed from the Roll of Lodges on 1 December 1830.

== See also ==
- Freemasonry
- Masonic Hall, Monmouth
