= Streets and squares in Dublin =

Street signs in Dublin

This article deals with the streets and squares in the city of Dublin and the Greater Dublin Area of Ireland.

== Street naming ==
Many streets in Dublin carry names given during the period of English rule, however there is a core of central city streets which retain names which reflect their Viking origins such as Fishamble Street, Winetavern Street, and Wood Quay. Some streets were renamed during the late colonial or Free State periods. Approximately 5% of street names are dedicated to a saint, such as Thomas Street. A sub-committee was formed by the Dublin Corporation which published a report entitled Report of the Paving Committee in 1921, which recommended the renaming of a number of streets in Dublin, such as Pearse Street, but not all the recommendations were adopted.

Street names fall into several categories. Many are named for persons such as British kings, queens, and their families, lords lieutenant, nobles, lord mayors, other state officials, Irish nationalist figures, celebrities, and property owners. Others are named for churches, public buildings, signs of public houses or taverns, places of historical note, places in London, occupations, and titles of office. A few are named for the physical characteristics of the street or the surrounding area, and a few are corruptions of previous names. Some names allude to the crafts and trade that was historically conducted in the area, or in some cases, to agricultural associations.

Street names are modified with a number of terms. Generally, larger thoroughfare names include avenue, parade, road, and street. Smaller street names include alley, close, court, lane, mews, place, row, and terrace. Special locations or layouts include cottages, gardens, grove, hill, market, park, quay, square, villas, and yard and some these terms tend to be used more outside of the city centre.

In some cases, the Irish name and the English name are not a direct translation of each other, but instead may refer to older names for the area or avoid the use of "anglicisms" within the Irish nomenclature, an example is Durham Street becoming Sráid Darmhagh. Some translations have been critiqued for being too literal, such as Wood Quay at first being translated as Cé na Coille and later amended to An Ché Adhmaid.

== Street signage ==
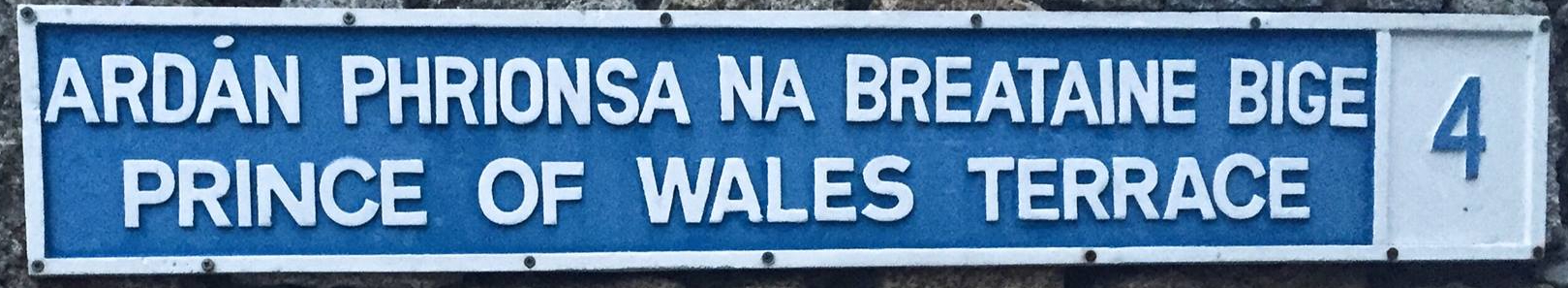
A standard-issue Dublin street sign with raised lettering. The Dublin postal district is to the right of the street name, which is in Irish and English.

Dublin streets are signed in a style consistent with many European and British cities whereby nearly all signs are placed on buildings adjacent to street junctions, rather than on free-standing signposts. However, where it has not been possible to affix the sign to the building immediately next to the junction, sometimes the second or even third building is used. In modern suburban areas, affixing the sign to a boundary wall or fence is common. Dublin street signs typically have white lettering on a blue background with the Irish above and English name below, given along with the Dublin postal district number. Designs and colours from several eras remain in use.

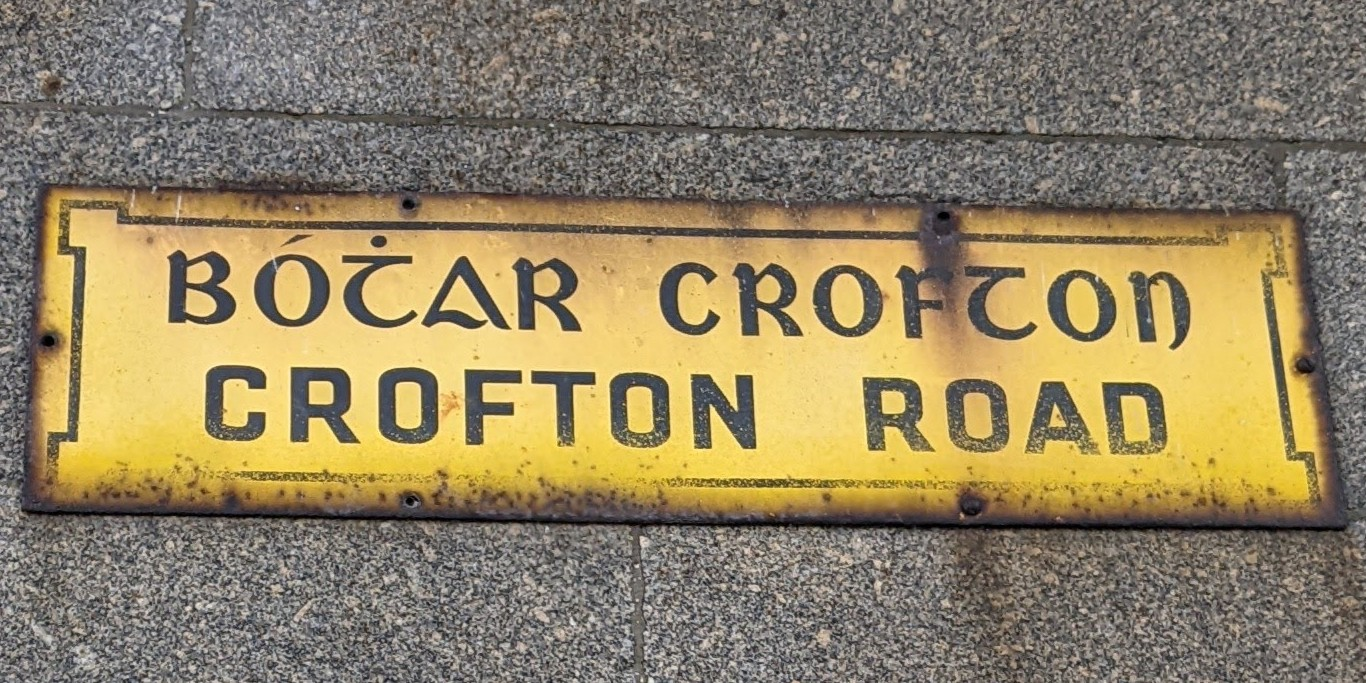
Sign for Crofton Road sign, Dún Laoghaire, an example of an early bilingual Irish street sign

The first Dublin street signs from the 18th century were wooden and no examples survive. Cast iron was used from the 19th century. These signs were exclusively in English and some survive. Bilingual signage first appeared in the early 1900s as part of the Gaelic Revival, with some of the earliest examples found in Blackrock and were in yellow and black. Later the colour scheme of green and white, with an enamel finish on metal sheeting, was adopted before the establishment of the Irish Free State, with these being used to replace the monolingual 19th century signs. Signs remained green and white until the 1950s, when the blue and white was adopted. Until the 1950s, Irish names were written using Cló Gaelach font, but this was phased out and abandoned in the 1960s, although use of the Irish: séimhiú for lenition continued for some time after. In the mid-20th century new signs were made from cast aluminium instead of the former cast iron or enamel finish.

== Address numbering ==
The system of building number generally follows the British pattern, with the conspicuous numbering of houses becoming mandatory in 1774 under the auspices of the Commissioners of Paving. Many streets, such as Grafton Street and Baggot Street Lower, numbers proceed sequentially up one side of the street to its terminus and then continue down the other side. The numbers usually begin in topographically lower areas and proceed upward, toward higher ground away from rivers. Other streets follow the pattern of even addresses on one side and odd numbers on the other. Unlike the usual North American style, generally each unit is given one number and no number is skipped, although with exceptions. This results in situations where the odd numbers on one side and the even numbers on the other do not match due to differing numbers of buildings on the respective sides. For example, No. 2 Percy Place is directly across from No. 53 Percy Place because Grand Canal frontage delays the beginning of the even numbers. Addresses on squares usually ascend in a clockwise direction, although Parnell Square is anti-clockwise. Where infill buildings have been added or buildings have been subdivided after a street was numbered, it is common to use suffix letters, e.g. 23A.

Up to the end of the 19th century, the use of terrace addresses was common and many of these remain. Typically, such terraces consisted of 4 to 20 commercial or residential buildings built at the same time as a single structure and with its own name. Examples include Orchard Terrace on Grangegorman Upper (street) and Waverly Terrace on Kenilworth Square. Some terraces have their own numbering systems, although sometimes they have been integrated with the street's numbering system and the terrace name has, to some extent, fallen out of use.

== History ==
Dublin's earliest roads were four long-distance routes that converged on the Gaelic-era Ford of the Reed Hurdles (Áth Cliath) over the River Liffey. These were the Slige Chualann (roughly the route of the present-day Harold's Cross Road) from Leinster in the south, Slige Dála (Crumlin Road) from Munster in the southwest, Slige Mór (Inchicore Road) from Connacht in the west, and Slige Midluachra (Dorset Street) from Ulster in the north.

The Vikings first established a fortified town at Dublin and its main street ran along what is now High Street and Castle Street.

Anglo-Norman Dublin maintained the basic Viking-era street plan and enlarged the town by expansion and land reclamation from the Liffey. The area north of present-day Cook Street and Essex Street was reclaimed during this time and provided with a relatively geometric street pattern. Streets became known for particular trades or activities and the names of several of these survive today, including Winetavern Street, Cook Street, Lamb Alley, Fishamble Street, Ship Street (originally Sheep Street). Most of the street layout within the old town walls dates from this period.

The first map of Dublin was produced by John Speed and is dated 1610. By this time, development had extended beyond the town walls and some streets retain their names or variations thereof from that time, such as James's Street, Stephen Street, Francis Street.

In Georgian Dublin of the middle and late 18th century, the Wide Streets Commission reshaped the old system of streets and created a network of main thoroughfares by wholesale demolition and widening of old streets, and the creation of entirely new ones.

Most of the streets in central Dublin retain names from the period of British rule but some have been renamed for Irish figures. Beginning in the late 19th century and continuing after Irish independence, streets were renamed usually either because of the prominence of their location, such as O'Connell Street, or the unacceptability of the previous name, such as Great Britain Street. Not all campaigns to rename streets were successful however, including the one to rename Talbot Street (named after a British Lord Lieutenant of Ireland) Seán Treacy Street.

In 1988, architect and town planner Patrick Shaffrey contrasted Dublin's architectural appearance with that of Edinburgh and Bath, describing Dublin's streets and squares thus: "The streets and squares, with their warm brick façades, beautifully proportioned and enlivened by wonderful doorways, delicate plaster reveals and graceful ironwork, impart a mellow, friendly, welcoming appearance, if at times wistful and neglected."

=== The Inner Tangent scheme ===
Throughout the 20th century, the Dublin Corporation pursued a policy of street widening in Dublin, in some cases to allow for the creation of dual carriageways including High Street, Bridge Street, Patrick Street, and Parnell Street. Much of this development was part of the corporation's "car-orientated perspective on the city". By 1985, 82 streets in the city had been affected by road-widening or proposed work, with all the works including the demolition of existing buildings. In 1959 the Corporation hired a German engineer as a consultant, Professor Karl Schaechterle, who proposed the creation of an outer ring dual-carriageway around the city, the creation of an "Inner Tangent" road through the city from St Stephen's Green to the Liberties, towards North King Street and Parnell Street and back to the Green via Pearse Street and Westland Row. He also proposed the widening of all the quays. Schaechterle's report was used as the basis for the corporation's road improvement works until the 1980s. Under the Inner Tangent plans over 200 buildings, including houses, factories and shops, were earmarked for demolition by the 1980s, which did not include buildings already razed for the project.

The primary objection to the creation of dual-carriageways within the city was not only the demolition of so many Georgian and Victorian buildings, but that the resulting streets were "forbidding to pedestrians" and unlike the Continental boulevards that the planners cited as inspiration, the streets would be "noisy, dirty and polluted by traffic fumes". Among the supporters of the Inner Tangent were the Confederation of Irish Industry, the Dublin Chamber of Commerce, and the Construction Industry Federation. The stated aim of the Inner Tangent was to direct traffic passing through the city around the central business district (CBD) and to create "environmental cells" free of traffic. However, the layout of the route meant that drivers would not always stay on it, defeating the intended purpose as the "inner loop" remained incomplete by 1989.

== See also ==
- List of streets and squares in Dublin
- List of Dublin bridges and tunnels
- Transport in Dublin
