= The Big Parade (disambiguation) =

The Big Parade is a 1925 American silent film about World War I.

The Big Parade may also refer to:

- The Big Parade (1986 film), a Chinese drama directed by Chen Kaige
- "The Big Parade" (Dad's Army), an episode of the British sitcom Dad's Army
- "The Big Parade", a song by 10,000 Maniacs from their 1989 album Blind Man's Zoo

== See also ==
- "Big Parade", a song from the self-titled debut album by The Lumineers
- Parade (disambiguation)
