= 1 Monk Street, Monmouth =

Grade II Listed building in Monmouth, Wales

Former Working Men's Free Institute, Monmouth
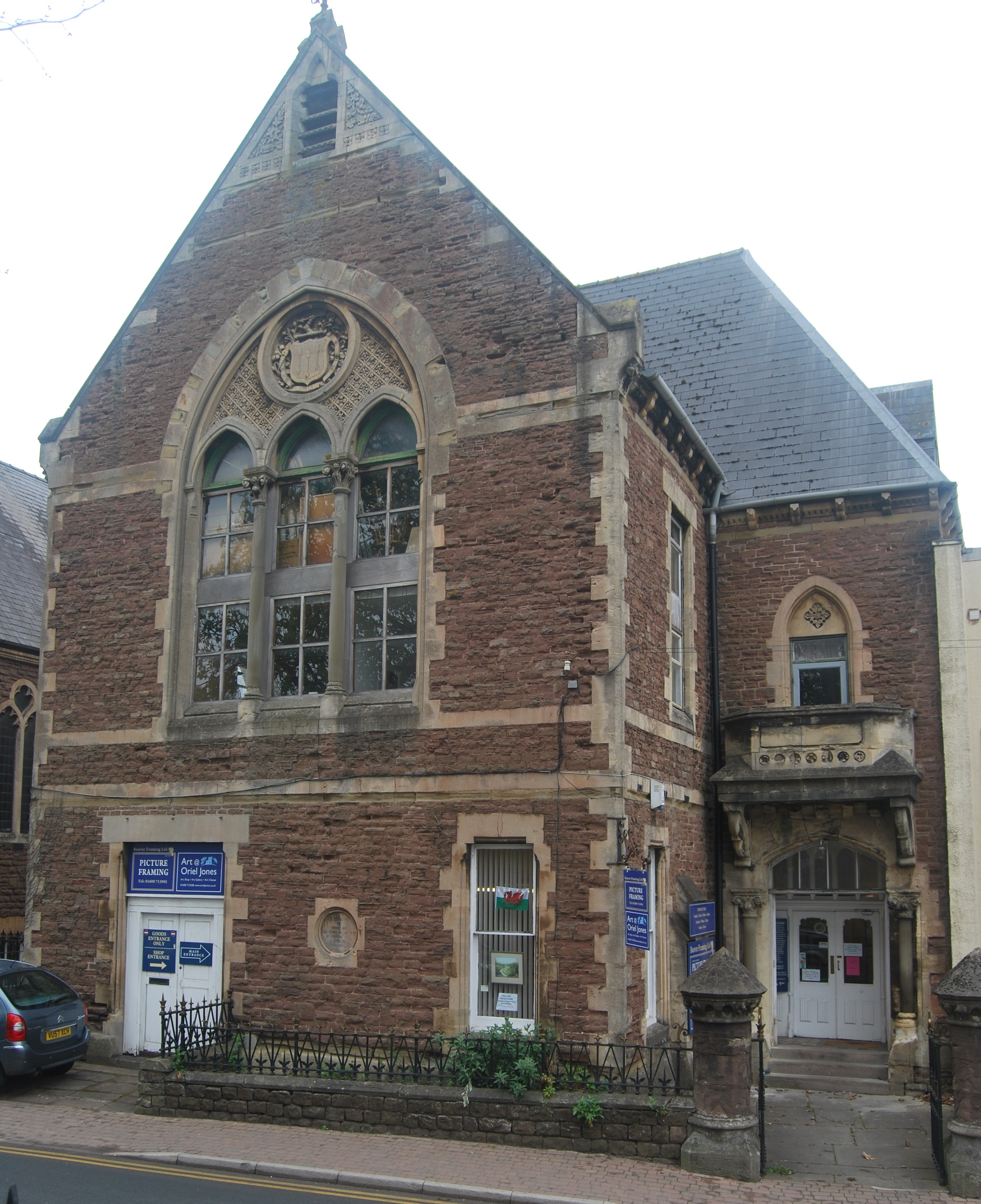
- Monmouth's former Working Men's Free Institute
- Location in Monmouth

General information
- Location: Monk Street off St James Square,, Monmouth, Wales
- Coordinates: 51.8131°N 2.7111°W
- Current tenants: Art Gallery
- Opened: 15 October 1868

Design and construction
- Designations: Grade II Listed

1 Monk Street, Monmouth was built as a Working Men's Free Institute. It is a Grade II Listed building in Monmouth, Wales and located next to Monmouth Baptist Church.

The architect was Benjamin Lawrence of Newport who later designed the church next door. The institute's staircase was made by Macfarlane, Glasgow, Wrought Ironwork was by Cormell Cheltenham and the carvings were by J Willis. The building opened in 1868. A smoking room and lecture room were added in 1897.

== History ==
Mrs. Matilda Jones (died 1874) of Ancre Hill financed the Institutes construction. It opened its doors on 15 October 1868 following a procession to Ancre Hill, then the home of Matilda Jones, of working men headed by a Military band and accompanied by the friendly Societies with their banners. The purpose of the construction was to provide a library and reading lessons for the working class. The books were transferred from St Johns Street where Matilda Jones had been offering a private room for reading. The building included a Reading room, library, gallery, committee room and lecture hall.

A song was composed for the workmen to sing during its construction: O may our institute succeed, And prove to men a boon indeed. May many hearts receive the seed Of saving the truth. Another song which was sung at each general meeting was: Hurrah for the men who work

According to Keith Kissack some of the lectures may have been hard going with a programme of 1892/3 a selection being Hommer, Drink Work & Wages, Queens English, The Family Circle, The Solar System, French Salons, Fossils, Egypt, The War of The Roses, Cathedrals in Britain Most of the lectures lasted about two hours and were followed by the chairman's remarks and thanks. Many of the lectures made use of Magic Lanterns for their opening.

In 1881 a meeting of teachers in the Institute elected to set up a Branch of the National Union of Elementary Teachers because they were unhappy being excluded from decision making in the schools. In 1885 the Church of England Temperance Society had offices in the building. Its members used the building when distributing petitions in favor of Sunday Closing and that flower shows were an antidote to alcohol. In 1890 the winter was particularly harsh with 56 consecutive days of frost. This led to the setting up of a Soup Kitchen in the Institute. In 1907 a series of Saturday Pop Concerts was held in the institute performed by the local regimental band.

The building has been Grade II Listed since 8 October 2005. The more recent uses for the premises have been an Art shop, Gallery and Framing Company.
