= Cottage Hospital, Monmouth =

Cottage Hospital
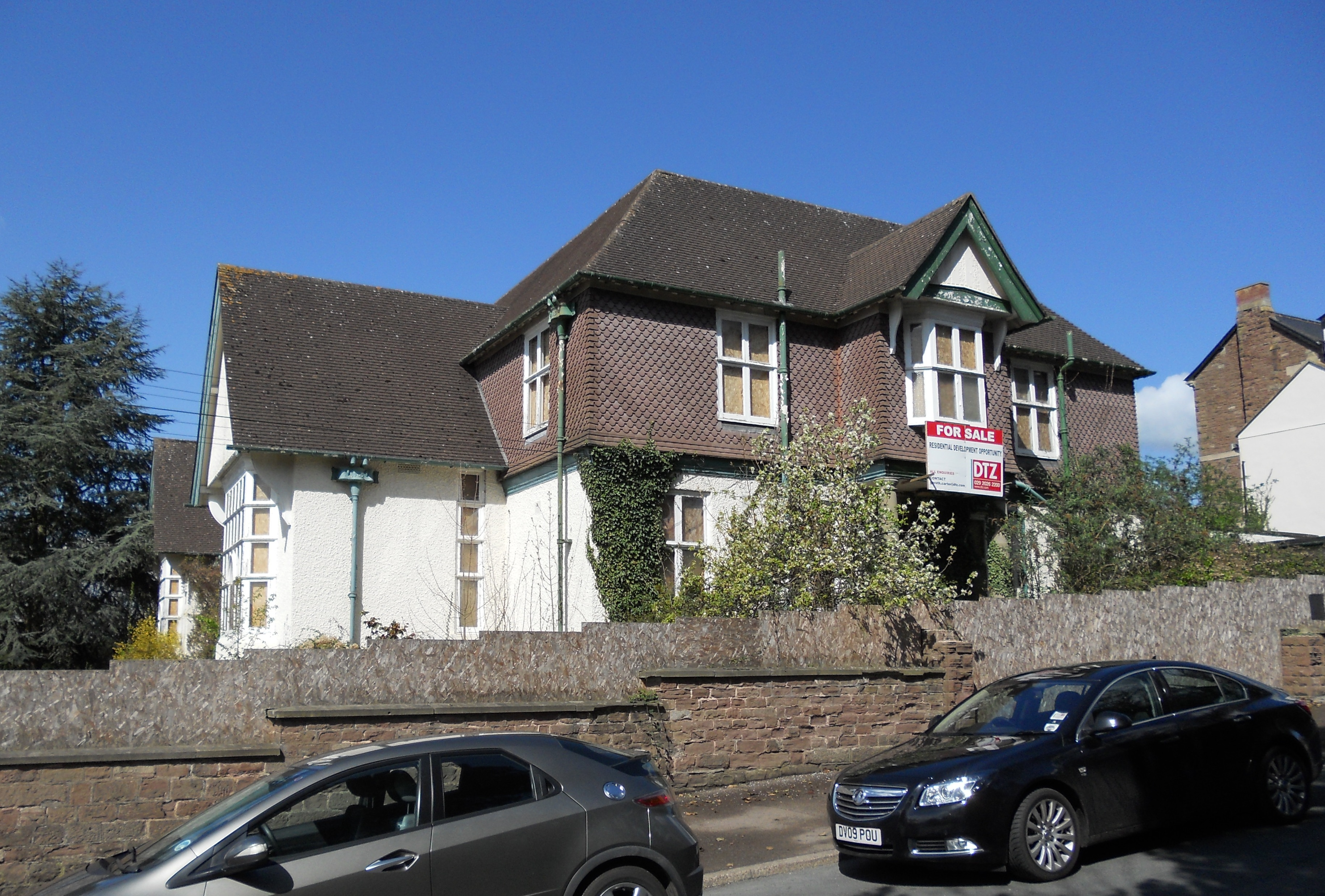
- Cottage Hospital

- Shown in Monmouthshire

Geography
- Location: Monmouth, Monmouthshire, Wales, United Kingdom
- Coordinates: 51.817431°N 2.713410°W

Organisation
- Care system: Public NHS
- Type: Community

History
- Founded: 1903
- Closed: 2006

Links
- Lists: Hospitals in Wales

The Cottage Hospital (Welsh: Ysbyty Bwthyn, Trefynwy) was a community hospital on the Hereford Road in Monmouth, Wales.

== History ==
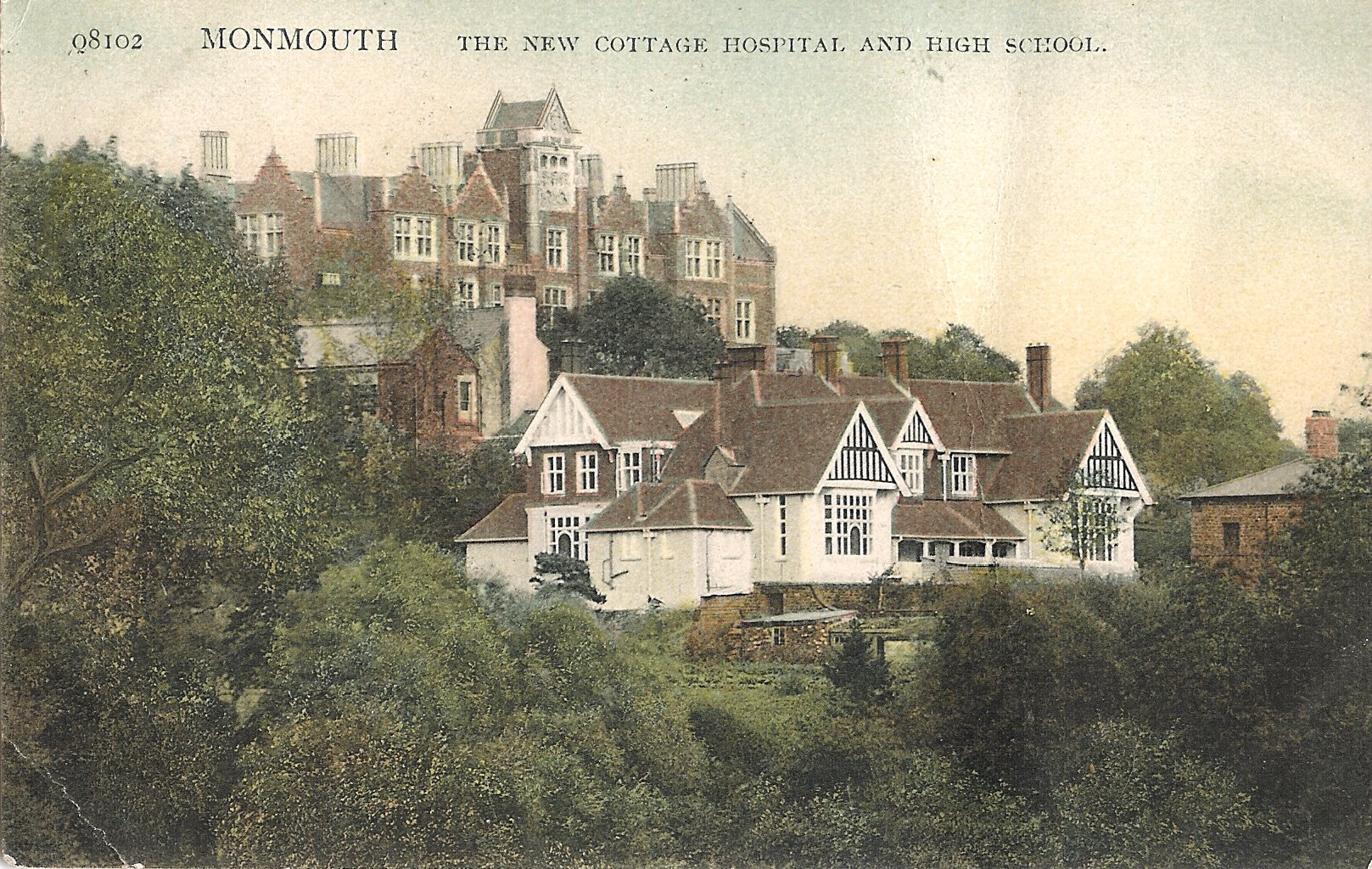
The New Cottage Hospital as photographed from the Cemetery in 1909

The Cottage Hospital was commissioned to replace the aging Monmouth Hospital and Dispensary in St James Square. The proposed site, which had been previously occupied by the Monmouth County Gaol, was bought from the Duke of Beaufort for £250. The foundation stone was laid by Lord Llangattock, President of the Hospital Board, on 27 September 1902.

The hospital was designed by Richard Creed, built by Collins and Geoffrey and furnished by George Edwards of Monmouth. The construction cost was around £7,500 of which £2,000 was donated by Lord Llangattock. The designer had to agree with the local vicar that the building would not obstruct the latter's view from the vicarage. According to Keith Kissack the new hospital was "one of the most successful building projects of the period in Monmouth".

The opening ceremony for the hospital was held on 6 November 1903 and started with a procession at 3pm from the earlier Dispensary in St James Square, led by the Monmouth Fire and Rescue Station and by Hamilton Traherne Baillie, Mayor of Monmouth. A crowd of around a 1,000 gathered at the site for the opening.

After services transferred to the Monnow Vale Integrated Health and Social Care Facility, the Cottage Hospital closed in 2006.
