= Ancre Hill Estates =

Coordinates: 51.812422°N 2.725051°W

- Location: Monmouth, Wales
- Founded: 2006
- First vintage: 2008
- Key people: Richard and Joy Morris (Owners)
- Varietals: Pinot noir, Chardonnay, Triomphe d'Alsace, Albariño
- Distribution: Online; General public; Retailers; Food service
- Website: ancrehillestates.co.uk

Ancre Hill Estates, also known as Ancre Hill Vineyard, is a family owned vineyard and winery in Monmouth, Wales. It also provides limited accommodation in Ancre Hill cottage.

== Site ==
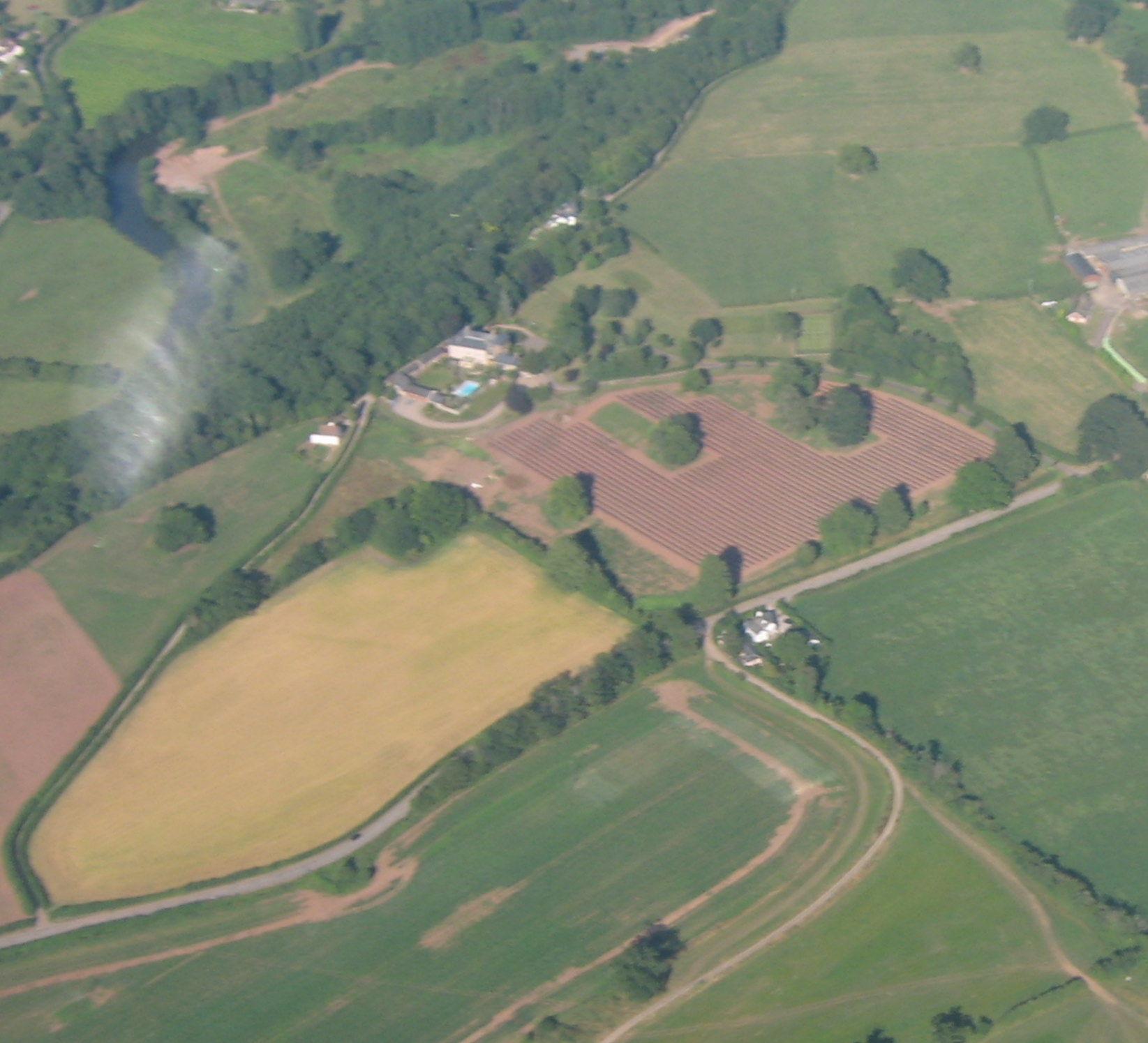
Ancre Hill Estate from the air, 2006

The vineyard is made up of two sites: Folly View site, of six and a half acres; and Town site, which is three and a half acres. Both are on the estate surrounding the house. The sites are south facing on limestone soils and have comparatively low rainfall. The initial planting of the vines was done in 2006, with a further plantations added in April 2007 and 2011. The estate adopted biodynamic agriculture practices in 2011 gaining organic certification in 2013 and Demeter certification in 2014

Historically the land at Ancre Hill was home to Matilda Jones, who paid for Monmouth Working Men's Institute to be built; it opened its doors in October 1868.

The site provides vineyard tours, wine tasting, Welsh cheese platter lunches, and an "Adopt-a-Vine" scheme.

== Awards ==
The 2009 Medium Dry White was listed as one of the top 10 wines by The Daily Telegraph in 2010. At the London International Wine Fair 2010, the vineyard won 2008 White Welsh Regional Wine. The vineyard also won a silver medal at the Decanter World Wine Awards, and a bronze medal in the International Wine and Spirit Competition.

In the English and Welsh Wine of the Year competition 2010, Ancre Hill has won the following awards: Silver – Welsh Regional Wine Dry White 2009, Bronze – Welsh Regional Wine medium dry white 2009, Highly recommended – Welsh Regional Wine rosé 2009. The vineyard also won Wales the True Taste Awards Gold Award in 2010-11 for their Medium Dry White, and a Bronze award for their Rosé

The first vintage of the Sparkling white 2008 was voted the best Sparkling wine in the world in 2012 at the Bollicine del Mondo, held by Euposia magazine in Verona, Italy. Beating over 20 Champagnes in a blind tasting.

== Gallery ==
Ancre Hill Vineyard View

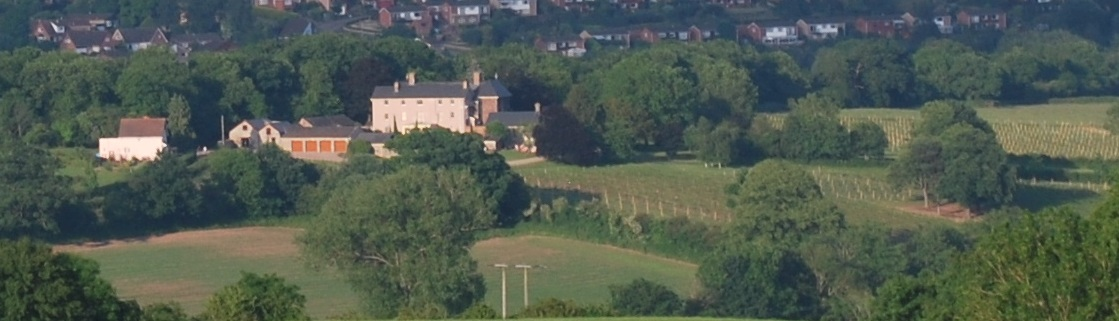
Ancre Hill Vineyard View from Caxton Tower
