= North Parade House, Monmouth =

House in Monmouth, Wales

North Parade House
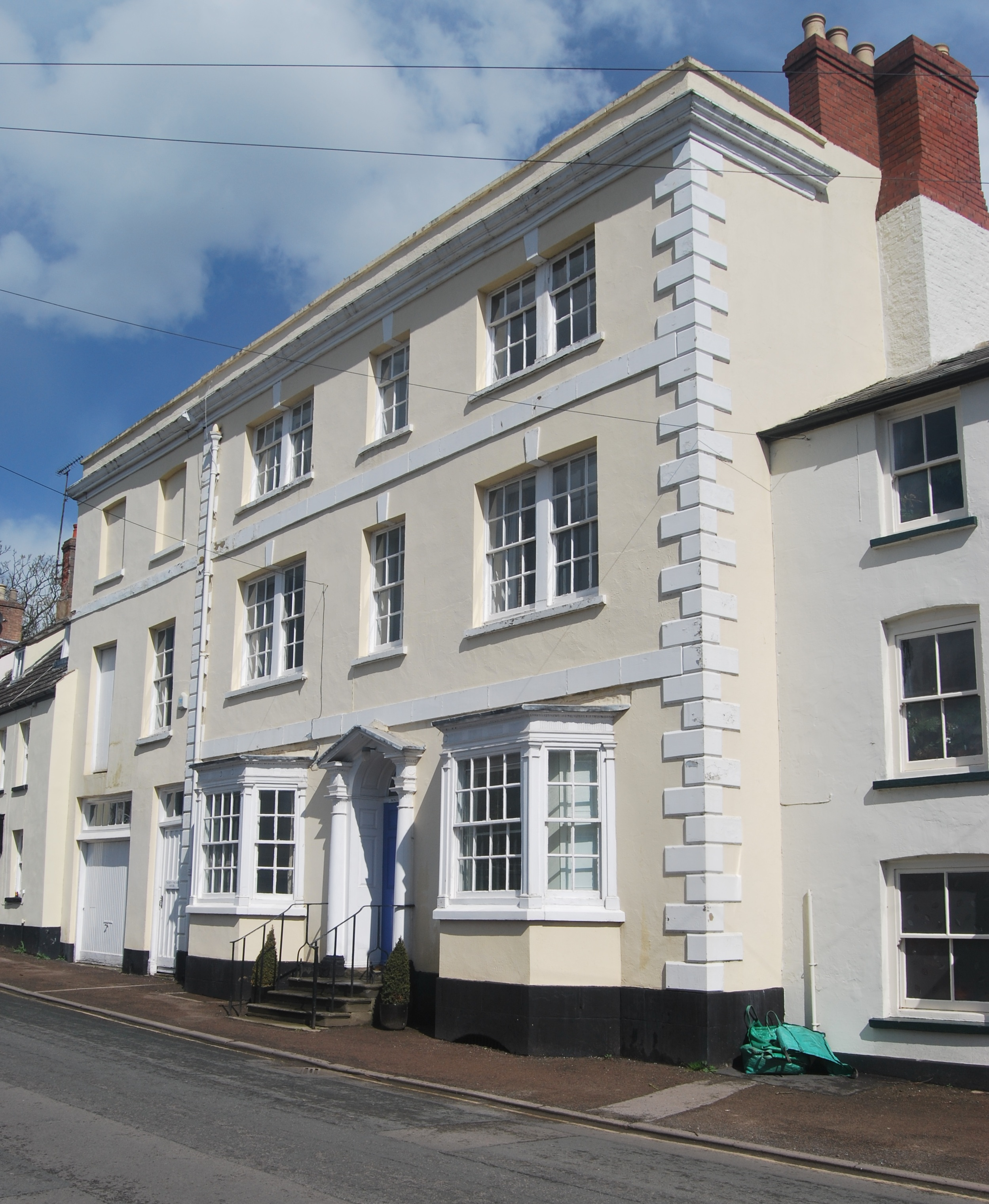
- Interactive map of the North Parade House area

General information
- Architectural style: Stucco-fronted
- Location: The Parade, Hereford Road, Monmouth, Wales
- Coordinates: 51.81667°N 2.713°W
- Current tenants: Private
- Completed: Late 18th century

Design and construction
- Designations: Grade II listed

North Parade House, in Monmouth Wales, dates from the late 18th century, and was refurbished in c.1800 by a wool merchant who took over the malthouse next door as a wool store, along with the cottages further up the street as housing for his workers. It has been a grade II listed building since 27 October 1965.

== Description ==
Windows on the north gable of the store part of the building suggest that the building post dates the cottages. circa 1800 and later features are seen internally. The building is stucco-fronted and has Welsh slate roofs. There are three storeys with a parapet with a hipped roof. Left of the main house, is a three-storey extension. This was the original malt-house that was converted into a warehouse for preparing and storing the wool. It has no windows on the second floor, and only one to the first floor. The roof of this part is also hidden behind a parapet and is hipped from front to back.

The building has Adam-style fireplaces in several rooms and a walled garden at the rear that allowed access to the building from the cottages. Keith Kissack suggested that the house, former work place and cottages are a well-preserved example of the way business, industry and family life could be combined. He also points out how the view from the house changed quite severely over the years, having Monmouth County Gaol being built in 1790 and demolished in 1884. The house being shown in a photograph dating from 1860 showing Toll house and Monmouth County Gaol with North Parade House on the right.

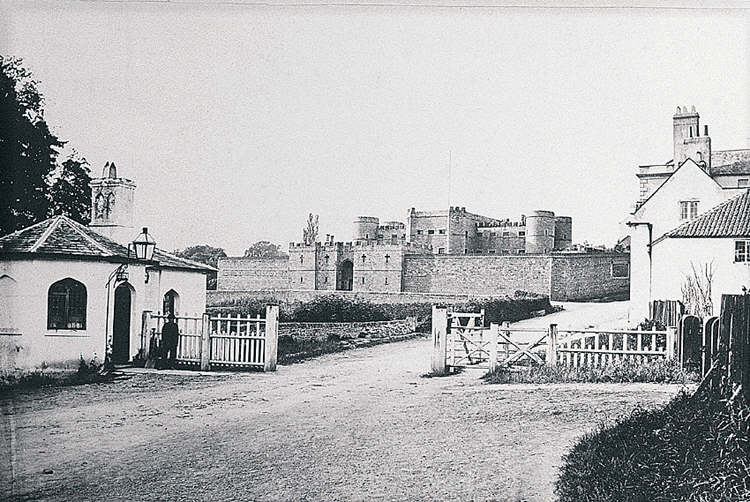
1860 Picture of Monmouth County Gaol – the tollhouse on the Hereford Road still stands today North Parade House opposite on the right
