= Monmouth Baptist Church =

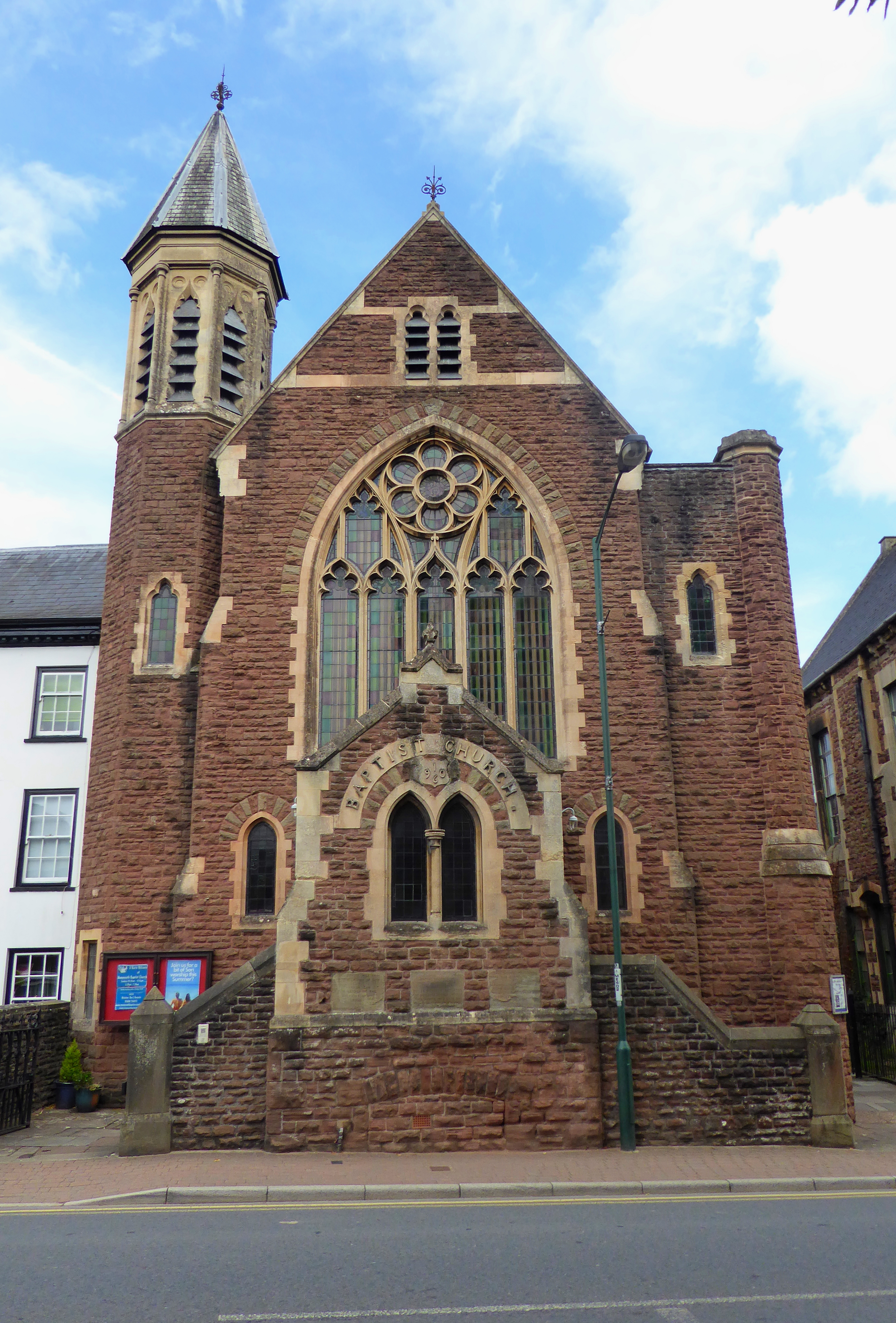
- The church
- Monmouth Baptist Church
- 51°48′47.6″N 2°42′39.9″W
- Location: Monmouth, Monmouthshire
- Country: Wales
- Denomination: Baptist
- Website: monmouthbaptistchurch.co.uk

Architecture
- Architect: Benjamin Lawrence
- Years built: 1906-07

Monmouth Baptist Church is located in Monk Street, Monmouth, south east Wales. The church building was opened in 1907, although the Baptist congregation had been formed in 1818. The church became a Grade II listed building on 27 October 1998.

== History ==
The congregation formed in 1818, after several ministers from associated churches visited the town. The church originally met in a small building, just off Monnow Street. The first pastor was appointed in 1831, and the original meeting place was enlarged in 1836 to form a chapel. After becoming derelict, it was demolished in recent years to make way for a supermarket car park.

The foundations of a new church in Monk Street were laid out in 1906, and the building was opened the following year. The architect was Benjamin Lawrence of Newport, who designed it in a similar Victorian Gothic style to the Working Men's Institute (now a commercial art gallery) which he had designed next door in 1867. The building is constructed of Old Red Sandstone, with Bath Stone dressings. The stained glass in the porch was added in 1964.
