= Monmouth Fire and Rescue Station =

Monmouth Fire Station
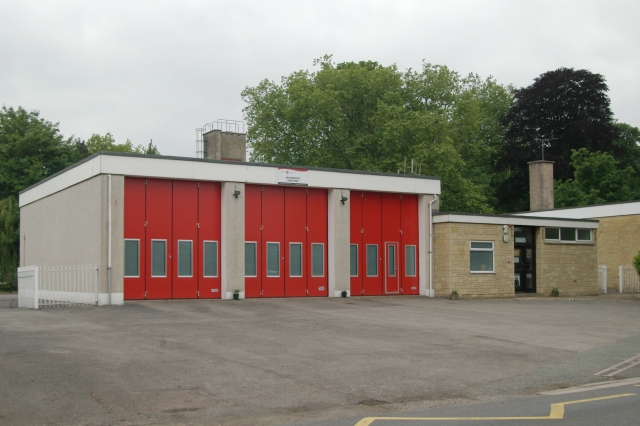
- Monmouth Fire Station

General information
- Address: Rockfield Road
- Town or city: Monmouth
- Country: Wales
- Coordinates: 51.810843°N 2.723717°W

Monmouth Fire and Rescue Service
Operational area
- Country: Wales
- Town: Monmouth

Agency overview
- Employees: 21

Facilities and equipment
- Stations: 1

Website
- Official website

Monmouth Fire and Rescue Station is located on the Rockfield Road, Monmouth, Wales. The station looks after Monmouth and its surrounding area, and is part of the South Wales Fire and Rescue Service. There is currently one Retained Watch (not full-time).

Monmouth Fire and Rescue Station has one Station Commander who is also responsible for two other stations. There is one watch manager who looks after the station and its resources. The resources are:

- 6 crew managers
- 16 firefighters
- 1 administrative support
- 2 front line appliances (fire engines), one of which has enhanced Road Traffic Collision rescue capacity

== History ==
The extent of the fire service in Monmouth in early records consisted of three ladders and a leather bucket kept under the Shire Hall arches. In 1733, a small fire engine was bought and housed in the jury room of the Shire Hall. At this time the council did not accept responsibility for fire fighting and it fell on the parish officers to organise the response. A public appeal in 1832 raised £150 to buy a new engine and repair the old one but this still left a lack of buckets and hoses. Public criticism of the council after several fires shamed the council into providing a firehouse but there was still little confidence in the fire response.

The Sergeant of Police usually took control of the fire response. It was not until the 1850s that a Captain of the Brigade was appointed. There were no full-time members of the brigade and the hoses were nearly always too short and horses were difficult to find.

More fires, including one at the Kings Head, led to more criticism, which led to the raising of a subscription to form a regular force. More criticism followed as most of the money was spent on uniforms rather than equipment and training for the firemen.

In 1879 the Duke of Beaufort installed four of Dicks Portable Fire Engines at Troy House as the units had proved successful at fighting fires elsewhere.

The Saw Mills caught fire in 1883 and the nearby Monmouth Gasworks were threatened. A fire in a tobacconist shop in Agincourt Square in 1887 left 3 children dead. The Tannery caught fire several times and was nearly destroyed in 1889. However, this was deemed not the fire brigade's fault as the fire bell was in the church tower and St. Mary's Church gates were locked. It took a while for someone to scale the railings.

An annual Fire Brigade dinner in 1888, held by the new Brigade Captain Mr. Honeyfield, saw only four councilors turn up, as support for the service was weak. In 1912, there was a suggestion of buying a new fire engine but this was turned down as a waste of money by the council on the grounds that the fire brigade rarely practiced and the shopkeepers had spent money on fire escapes. A new motorised fire engine was not acquired until after the Great War.

Previous locations for fire stations in Monmouth are Whitecross Street and St. Mary's Street. The St. Mary's Street station was a combined ambulance station whereas the Whitecross street location was just for the fire brigade engine and pump. The station moved from Whitecross Street sometime after 1929.

== Former Monmouth firehouses ==
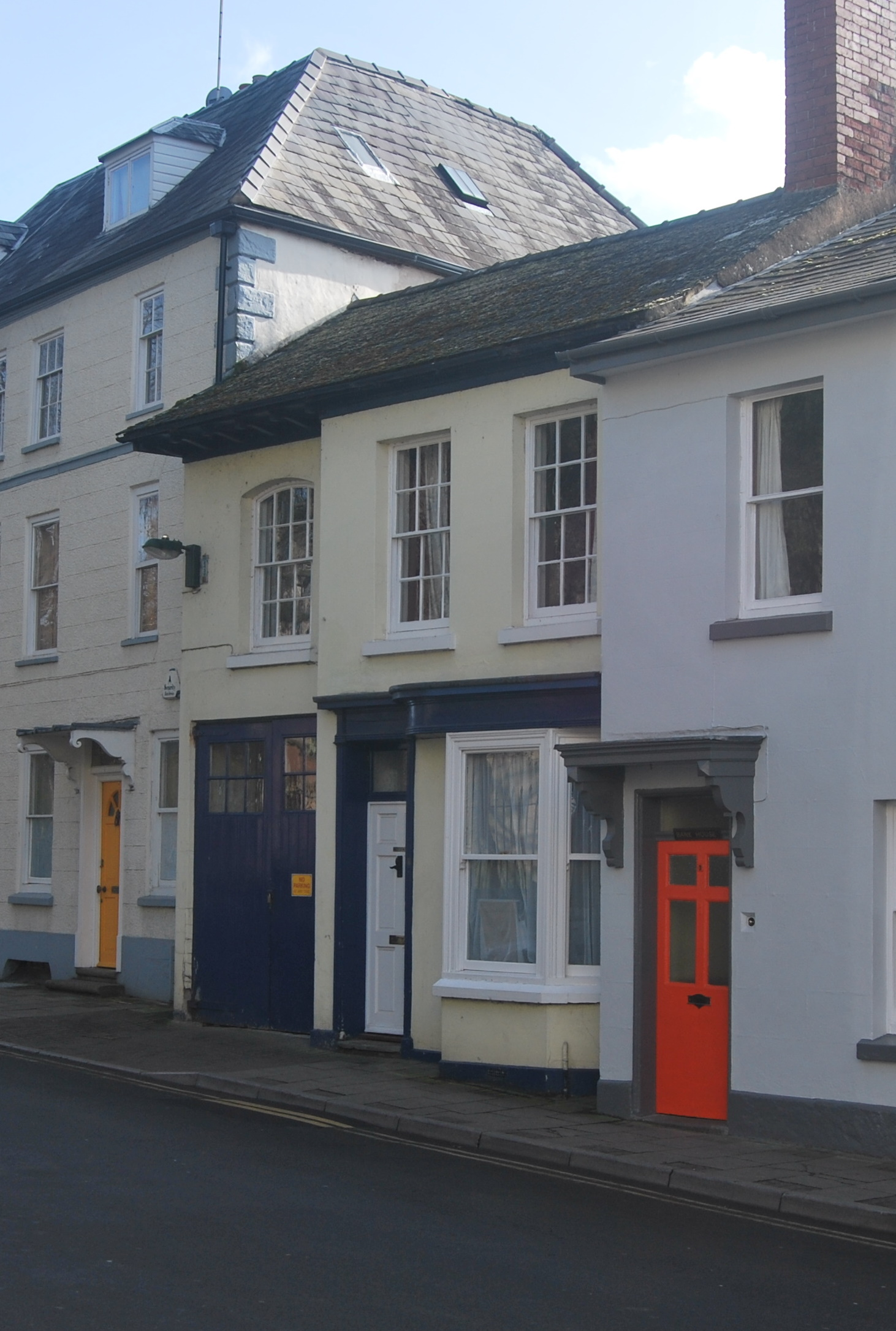
Former Firehouse in Whitecross Street Monmouth

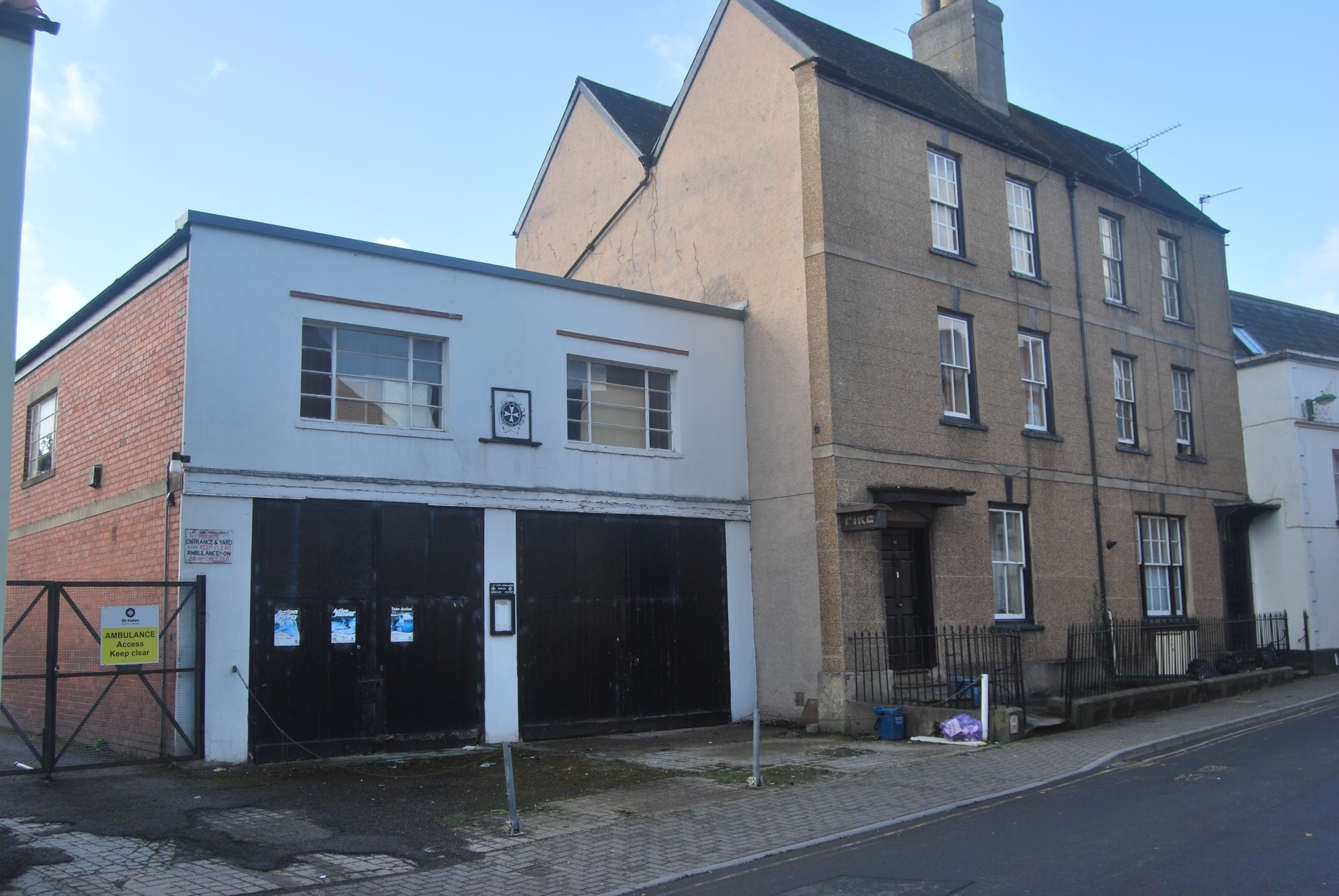
Former Fire Station in Monmouth St Marys Street
