= Royal George House =

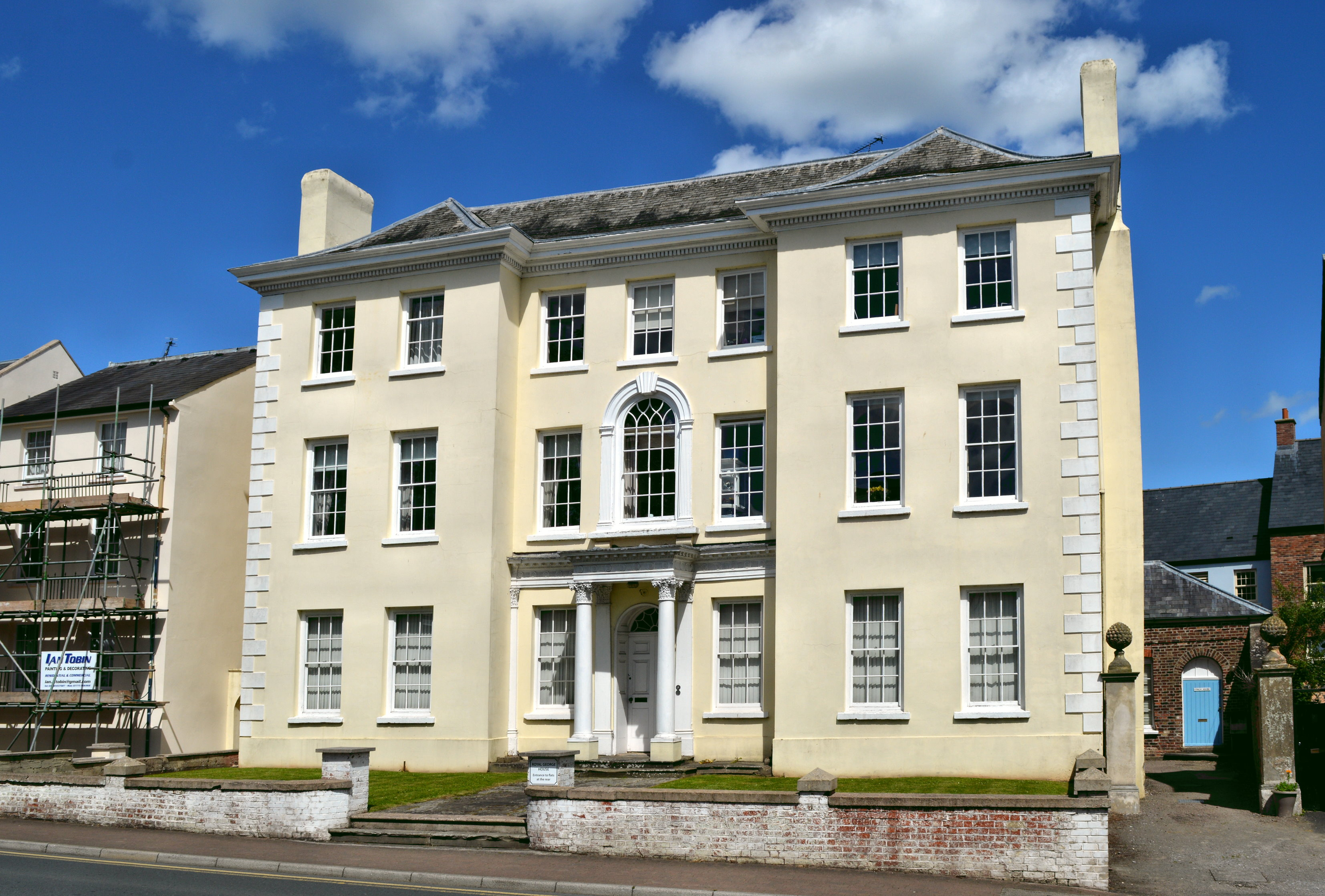

- Location within Monmouthshire
- 51.8139°N 2.7125°W
- Type: Offices
- Location: 5 Monk Street, Monmouth, Monmouthshire, Wales

History
- Built: c. 1730

Site notes
- Architectural style: Georgian
- Governing body: Privately owned

Listed Building – Grade II*
- Official name: The Royal George Hotel (Formerly the Ivy Bank Hotel), Monk Street, Gwent
- Designated: 10 August 2005
- Reference no.: 2282

Royal George House in Monmouth, Wales, is a large Georgian townhouse of c. 1730. Its architectural style is "old-fashioned" for its date, drawing on Carolean models such as Tredegar House. Built as a private residence, in 1800 it was occupied by the commander of the Monmouthshire Militia. In the 19th and 20th centuries the building was a hotel, first the Ivy Bank and then the Royal George. By the 1980s, it was empty and derelict. Restored, and significantly altered internally, in 1985–1987, it was subsequently a nursing home, and as of 2017 it houses commercial offices and residential apartments. It is a Grade II* listed building.

== History ==
The house is early 18th century in date with an historical attribution to 1730. Constructed as a residential townhouse, it was owned in 1800 by the commander of the Monmouthshire Militia. The commander undertook significant remodelling of the house. Later in the century, the house became a hotel, first the Ivy Bank and then the Royal George. It was designated a Grade II* listed building on 27 June 1952. In the 20th century, the hotel closed and the building suffered significant neglect. It was restored 1985–1987, and was used firstly as a nursing home and then as commercial offices and residential apartments. The building’s roof was severely damaged by fire during renovation work in 2021 and is undergoing restoration.

== Description ==
The building is of three storeys, with seven bays under a hipped roof, and was constructed "probably in the 1730s." The building's façade was originally roughcast to imitate masonry and has a modillioned cornice. Designed in a Carolean style, it was out of date for its time.

The architectural historian John Newman, describes the building as "one of the town's finest 18th century houses." The Monmouth historian Keith Kissack noted its Neoclassical interiors of about 1800, introduced when the commander of the Monmouthshire Militia remodelled the house. The renovations were external, as well as internal, Newman comments on the "Adamesque Corinthian capitals and Doric frieze."
