= Monmouth County Gaol =

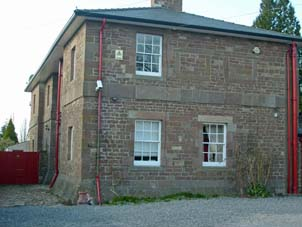
- The gatehouse to the former County Gaol
- Interactive map of the Monmouth County Gaol area

General information
- Type: Prison
- Location: Monmouth, Wales
- Coordinates: 51°49′1.3″N 2°42′48.9″W
- Construction started: 1788
- Completed: 1790
- Cost: £5,000

Design and construction
- Architect: William Blackburn
- Designations: Grade II listed

The County Gaol, situated in North Parade, Monmouth, Wales, was Monmouthshire's main prison when it was opened in 1790. It served as the county jail of Monmouthshire and criminals or those who fell foul of the authorities were hanged here until the 1850s and some 3,000 people viewed the last hanging. The jail covered an area of about an acre, with a chapel, infirmary, living quarters and a treadmill. It was closed in 1869. In 1884 most of the building was demolished, and today nothing remains but the gatehouse which is a Grade II listed building. Within the gatehouse, there exists "a representation in coloured glass of the complete original buildings". It is one of 24 buildings on the Monmouth Heritage Trail.

== History ==
The gaol was designed by William Blackburn and constructed between 1788 and 1790. It was designed as a reformed gaol, following the principles of the first prison reformer John Howard. The first Governor was James Baker, who received £100 per annum. The gaol cost around £5,000 to build, on land procured from Henry Somerset, 5th Duke of Beaufort and was constructed of local stone, some 18,000 tons of which was removed from a quarry situated in Lower Redbrook.

A nineteenth-century print gives an idea of the gaol's size and strength, and shows the gatehouse in the centre of the south wall. Contemporary descriptions speak of "a massive building looking more like a castle than a gaol, having high outer walls and an inner building complete with tall round bastions". It was commended "for the commodious distribution of the whole, the airiness of the compartments, the propriety of the regulations, and the strict attention paid to the cleanliness and morals of the prisoners". Inmates imprisoned in the gaol for debt could expect a bedstead, sheets, two blankets in the winter and a rug. They would also be given a sixpenny loaf four times a year as the result of a bequest of a Monmouth man who left £100 for that purpose. Generally, the prisoners' diet was poor in the extreme. Felons were allowed 1d of bread a day, but there was no allowance for debtors. John Howard, the penal reformer, noted that many debtors survived on 'water soup' – soup which consisted of bread boiled in water.

The longer a prisoner spent in the gaol, the more food they were allowed, receiving such extras as an additional pint of oatmeal gruel for breakfast, 4ozs of cooked meat and 12ozs of potatoes twice a week and a pint of broth twice a week. This diet, lacking as it did any significant quantity of Vitamin C, led to many of the longer-term prisoners suffering from scurvy.

As late as 1851 the Merlin, the local paper, noted that "the diet in the County Gaol is now confined to oatmeal porridge, milk and bread; meat and vegetables not being allowed. It is said that the knowledge of this spartan fare has already had a good effect outside the prison walls." The message being that would-be criminals would be deterred from crime simply by knowing how dreadful prison fare actually was.

Prisoners were so weakened by this diet however, that in 1853, when typhus broke out, they were unable to resist the disease which quickly spread, killing at least one prisoner.

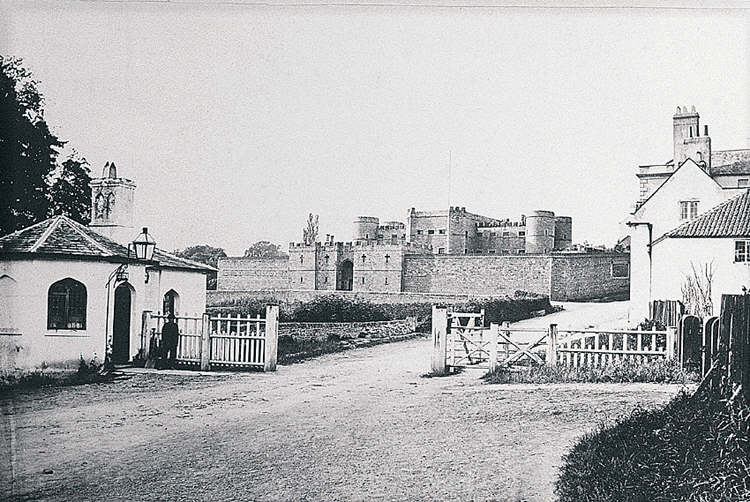
A 19th-century print of Monmouth County Gaol – the tollhouse on the Hereford Road still stands today as does North Parade House which is on the right.

The three Chartist leaders, John Frost, Zephaniah Williams, William Jones, and others were imprisoned in the gaol after conviction at Shire Hall, Monmouth for treason on 16 January 1840. Their sentence of hanging, drawing and quartering was eventually commuted, by the Prime Minister Lord Melbourne, to transportation to Tasmania.

At that time hangings were carried out on the flat roof of the gatehouse. Two Irishmen, Maurice Murphy and Patrick Sullivan, were sentenced for the joint murder of Jane Lewis and were publicly executed, on 23 September 1850, on the roof. Their execution was watched from the grassy slopes of what is now Haberdashers' Monmouth School for Girls, by a crowd of about 3,000, of whom "about four-fifths were estimated to be of the softer sex". Executions were carried out in public there until nine years later (23 September 1859), when Matthew Francis was hanged for the murder of his wife. The illustration shows that the Gatehouse originally had castellated parapets and cross loops on the south elevation, so the current pitched roof and windows of the private house probably date from after its closure in 1869. The huge recessed archway remains, however, though with a domestic front door built into it.

When the gaol was closed in 1869, the prisoners were transferred to the New Gaol in Usk. The main buildings were demolished in 1884 and the stone was sold for building at Rock Crescent, now Monkswell Road, in Monmouth (just across from the Old Gaol), and at Sharpness Docks. The Cottage Hospital was built on part of the site between the years 1902 and 1903. Today nothing remains of the gaol but the square Old Red Sandstone gatehouse, which has been adapted into two private dwellings. The gatehouse became a Grade II listed building on 15 August 1974. It is one of 24 buildings on the Monmouth Heritage Trail.
