= Hit Parade (disambiguation) =

A hit parade is a list of tunes that are most popular at any given time.

Hit Parade or hitparade or The Hit Parade may also refer to:

== Film and television ==
- Hit Parade (film), a 1953 West German musical film
- Hit Parade (TV series), a 1956–1959 Australian pop music series
- The Hit Parade (film), a 1937 American musical film directed by Gus Meins
- Hit Parade of 1941, a 1940 American film directed by John H. Auer
- Hit Parade of 1943, also known as Change of Heart, 1943 American musical film made by Republic Pictures and directed by Albert S. Rogell
- Hit Parade of 1951, a 1950 American musical film directed by John H. Auer
- Your Hit Parade, a 1935–1959 American radio and television music program, inaccurately referred to as The Hit Parade

== Literature ==
- Hit Parade, a novel by Lawrence Block

== Music ==
Bands

- The Hit Parade (group), an independent pop group from London, England

Albums

- Hit Parade (Audio Adrenaline album), 2001
- Hit Parade (Spirit of the West album), 1999
- Hit Parade (Paul Weller album), 2006
- Hit Parade 1, a 1992 compilation album by The Wedding Present
- Hit Parade 2, a 1993 compilation album by The Wedding Present
- The Hit Parade (Puffy AmiYumi album), a 2002 album by Puffy AmiYumi
- The Hit Parade (Tak Matsumoto album), a 2003 album by Tak Matsumoto
- Hit Parade (Róisín Murphy album), a 2023 album by Róisín Murphy

Songs

- "Hit Parade", a song by The Beautiful South from Painting It Red

== See also ==
- Collins and Maconie's Hit Parade, a British radio programme 1994–1997
- hitparade.ch or Swiss Hitparade, Switzerland's main music sales charts
- Hit Parader, an American music magazine
- ZDF-Hitparade, or simply Hitparade, a music television series by German TV channel ZDF
