= Masonic Hall, Monmouth =

Building in Monmouth, Wales

Masonic Hall
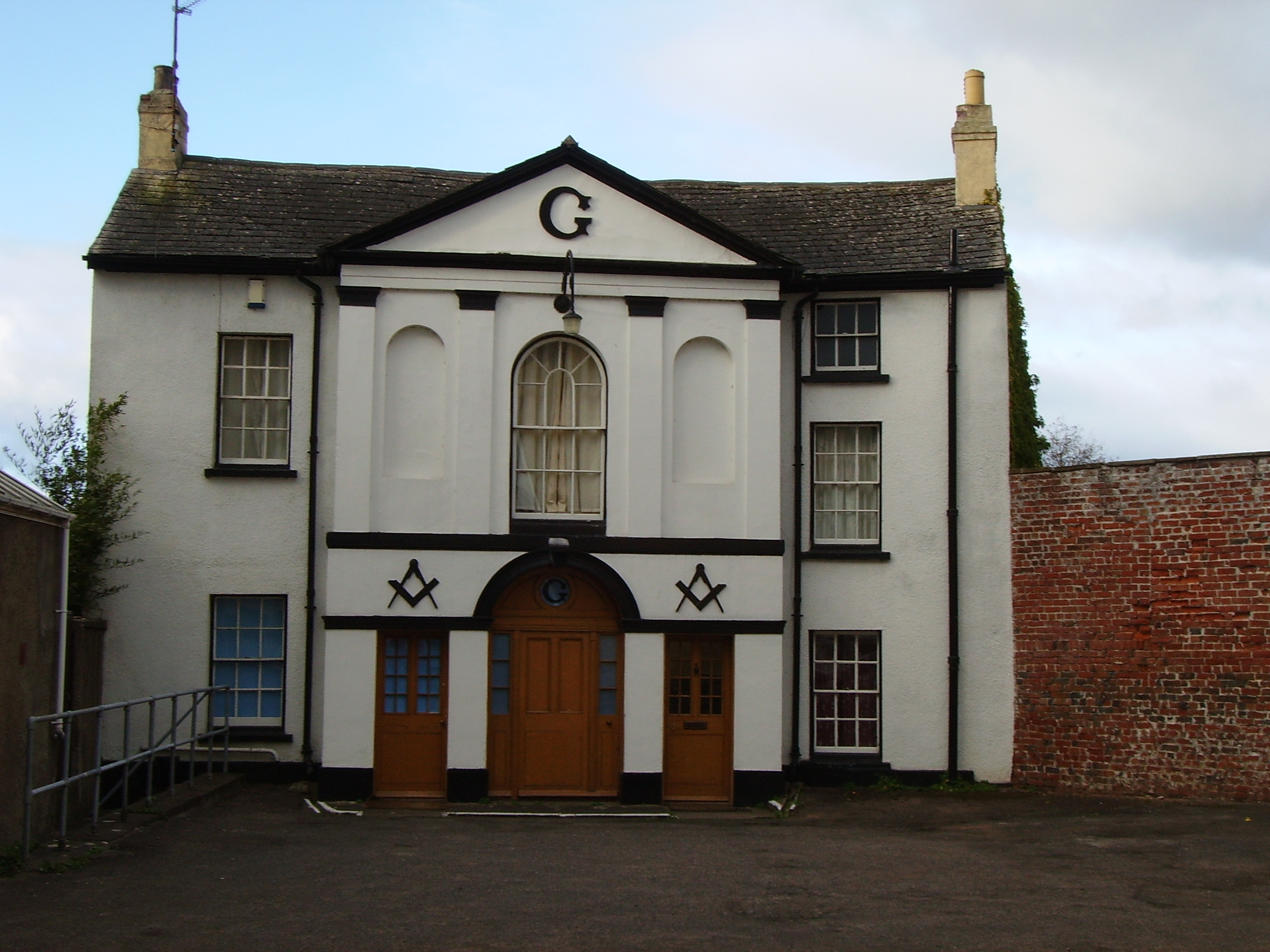
- Masonic Hall on Monk Street
- Interactive map of the Masonic Hall area

General information
- Architectural style: Classical
- Location: Monmouth, Monmouthshire, Wales, Monk Street
- Coordinates: 51.8145°N 2.7132°W
- Completed: 1846
- Owner: Loyal Monmouth Lodge 457

Design and construction
- Architect: George Vaughan Maddox
- Designations: Grade II Listed

The Masonic Hall is a grade II listed building on Monk Street in Monmouth, Monmouthshire, Wales. It was designed by architect George Vaughan Maddox. The building is believed to mark the site of Monk's Gate, part of the original defences of the town of Monmouth. Before its 1846 conversion to the Masonic Hall, the building served as the Monk Street Theatre. After more than 150 years of housing the Loyal Monmouth Lodge No. 457, the Masonic Hall sustained fire and smoke damage from suspected arson. The Lodge of Freemasons housed in the building is the oldest surviving Masonic Lodge in Monmouthshire.

== Design ==
The Masonic Hall (pictured) is a 19th-century, grade II listed building on Monk Street in Monmouth. It was designed by George Vaughan Maddox (1802–1864), son of James Maddox, also a Monmouth architect and builder. The Masonic Hall was constructed in 1846. Nine years earlier, the architect had used a similar design for the Monmouth Methodist Church on St James' Street, a grade II* listed building, and one of 24 blue plaque buildings on the Monmouth Heritage Trail. The Masonic Hall has a classical facade and a slate roof. The two-storey building's façade has five windows, which are asymmetrically positioned, two on the left and three on the right, and features a sixth, tall, round-headed window, which is centrally positioned over the main door. The building's exterior walls are roughcast. The Masonic symbol of square and compasses is visible over each of the two symmetrically positioned side doors.

== Origins ==
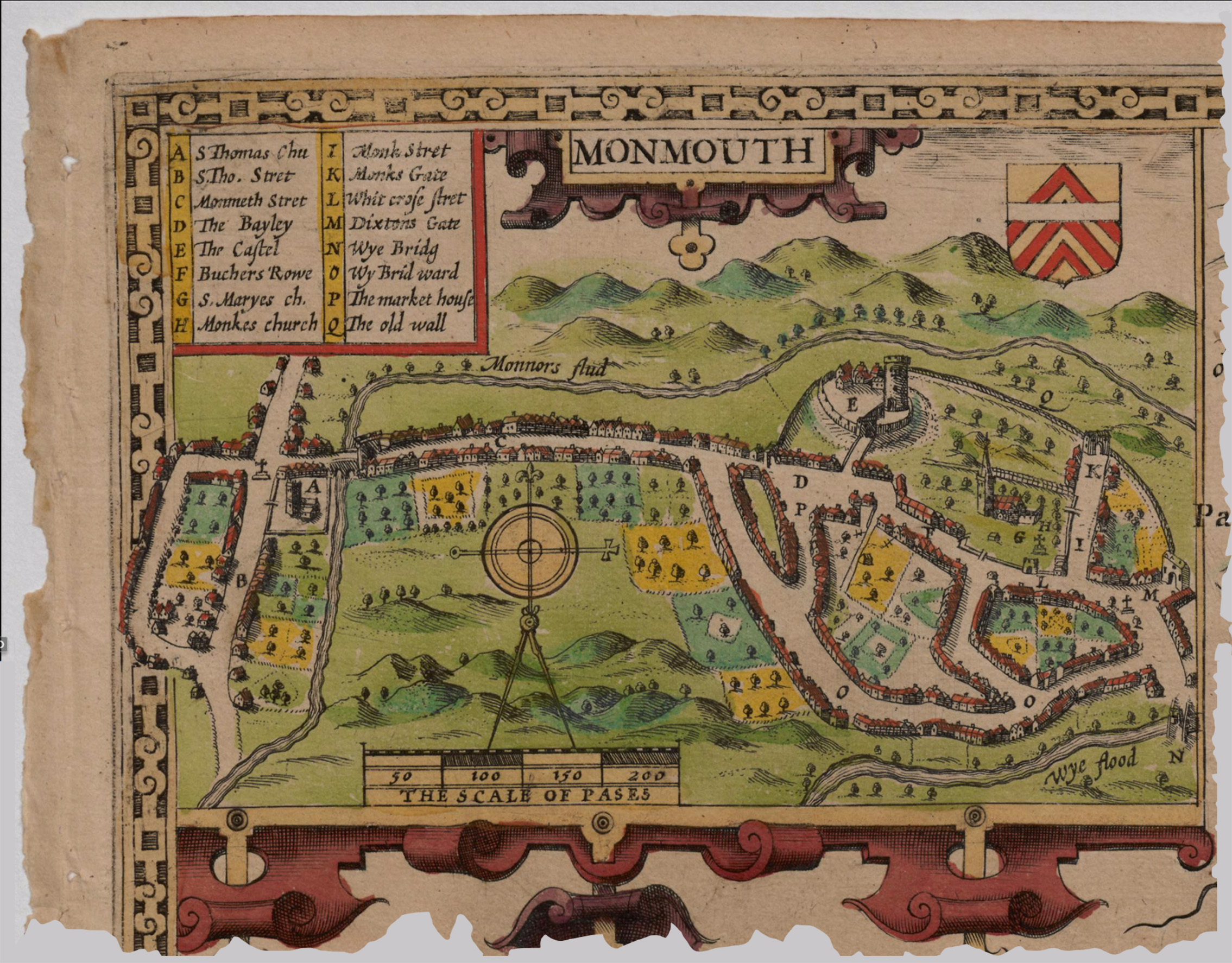
Map of Monmouth by cartographer John Speed illustrates Monk's Gate in 1610.

A curved wall to the right of the entrance to the Masonic Hall is thought to indicate the site of a portion of Monk's Gate. The gate, shown on the 1610 map of Monmouth (pictured) by cartographer John Speed, was a component of the Monmouth town walls and defences that were constructed circa 1300. While the gates of the town outlasted the walls themselves, Monk's Gate was removed in 1710. The building on that site in the early 19th century was occupied by the Monk Street Theatre from 1838 to 1844. It was converted to the Masonic Hall by Maddox in 1846, and given a completely new façade. However, the interior maintains a considerable amount of its original identity as a theatre. In February 2012, BBC News reported that architect Rob Firman had completed a project to visit and document each theatre and performance building in South Wales. He reported that the Monk Street Theatre had been converted to another use, as had been 28 other venues.

== Masonic Lodge ==
The Province (of Freemasons) of Monmouthshire was established in 1753. One of the earliest Masonic Lodges in Monmouthshire had its meetings at the Crown and Thistle Inn in Monmouth, but that Lodge did not survive. The oldest surviving Masonic Lodge in Monmouthshire is the Loyal Monmouth Lodge No. 457. With a warrant of 21 December 1838, it was established in 1839, originally as Masonic Lodge No. 671. It continues to have its meetings in Monmouth. The building in which it meets, the Masonic Hall, was the first building in Monmouthshire to be used mainly for masonic purposes. In 1923, the secretary of the lodge at the Masonic Hall was George B. Adamson.

== Fire and recovery ==
In April 2005, an investigation was launched to determine the cause of a fire that resulted in extensive damage to the Masonic Hall on Monk Street and that took half an hour to bring control. It was reported that the entire building sustained smoke damage. The Masonic Hall not only housed the Loyal Monmouth Lodge; for ten years, it also served as the home of the caretaker, who was away on holiday when the fire started. The investigation into the blaze resulted in the arrest of a local man on suspicion of arson. The building continues to be utilized. In September 2011, the Masonic Hall participated in "Open Doors 2011, European Heritage Days in Wales." It was promoted as "Wales's biggest celebration of architecture and heritage." Locally, the celebration was entitled "Open Doors in Monmouth" and there was strong participation in Monmouth, with the Masonic Hall one of about 20 buildings welcoming visitors during the weekend of 10–11 September.

== See also ==
- Monk Street, Monmouth
- Monmouth Town Walls and Defences
