= Parade (company) =

American underwear company

- Industry: Fashion
- Founded: 2019
- Founder: Cami Téllez and Jack DeFuria

Parade was an American apparel company known for its underwear. It was founded in 2019 by Cami Téllez and Jack DeFuria and acquired in 2023 by Ariela & Associates.

== Background ==
The company was founded by Cami Téllez and Jack DeFuria in 2019 and backed by $3.5 million from venture capital investors. To found the company, Téllez dropped out of Columbia University, where she studied English and Art History for seven semesters. Téllez, the daughter of Colombian immigrants, advocated for racial representation and size diversity in marketing. While she was a student, she wrote a manifesto on Google Docs that called for the "end of the Victoria's Secret Angels, the end of the bombshell bra, the end of this idea of one-note sexiness". The document went viral, and more than 70,000 people signed up for the underwear before the company had launched. Early-stage investors include Shakira, Karlie Kloss, and Warby Parker co-founder Neil Blumenthal.

== Business ==
At launch, Parade sold three styles of underwear in seven colors. It launched underwear labeled with the days of the week, which sold out within a day. In its first year, Parade had 15 staff members, most of whom were young. One employee told Business Insider that the company didn't offer health insurance in its first six months because employees were on their parents' plans.

According to The New York Times, Parade "sold over 700,000 pairs of underwear and brought in $10 million in revenue" during the pandemic, when many clothing companies floundered.

Parade featured size-inclusive branding. It engaged with micro influencers by offering free underwear gifts in exchange for posts on Instagram. Instead of working with large influencers, the company sent free products to people with small but dedicated followings, some of whom did not consider themselves influencers. An early ambassador was New York City drag queen West Dakota. Business Insider wrote that "posting an Instagram of yourself in a neon leopard panty with a lace-up butt crack or a mushroom-patterned high-rise brief became a rite of passage among certain oat-milk-drinking Brooklynites."

In fall of 2021, Parade opened a storefront in SoHo, Manhattan. As of August 2022, the company started selling products in Urban Outfitters and reached 10,000 ambassadors whom they call "Parade Friends." In early December 2020, Parade released a collaboration with Juicy Couture. In February 2023, the company announced underwire bras and in March 2023, 400 Target stores started selling Parade underwear.

In July 2023, Parade was acquired by Ariela & Associates.

In October 2025, Parade announced its closure.
