= Parade House, Monmouth =

Building in Monmouth, Wales

Parade House
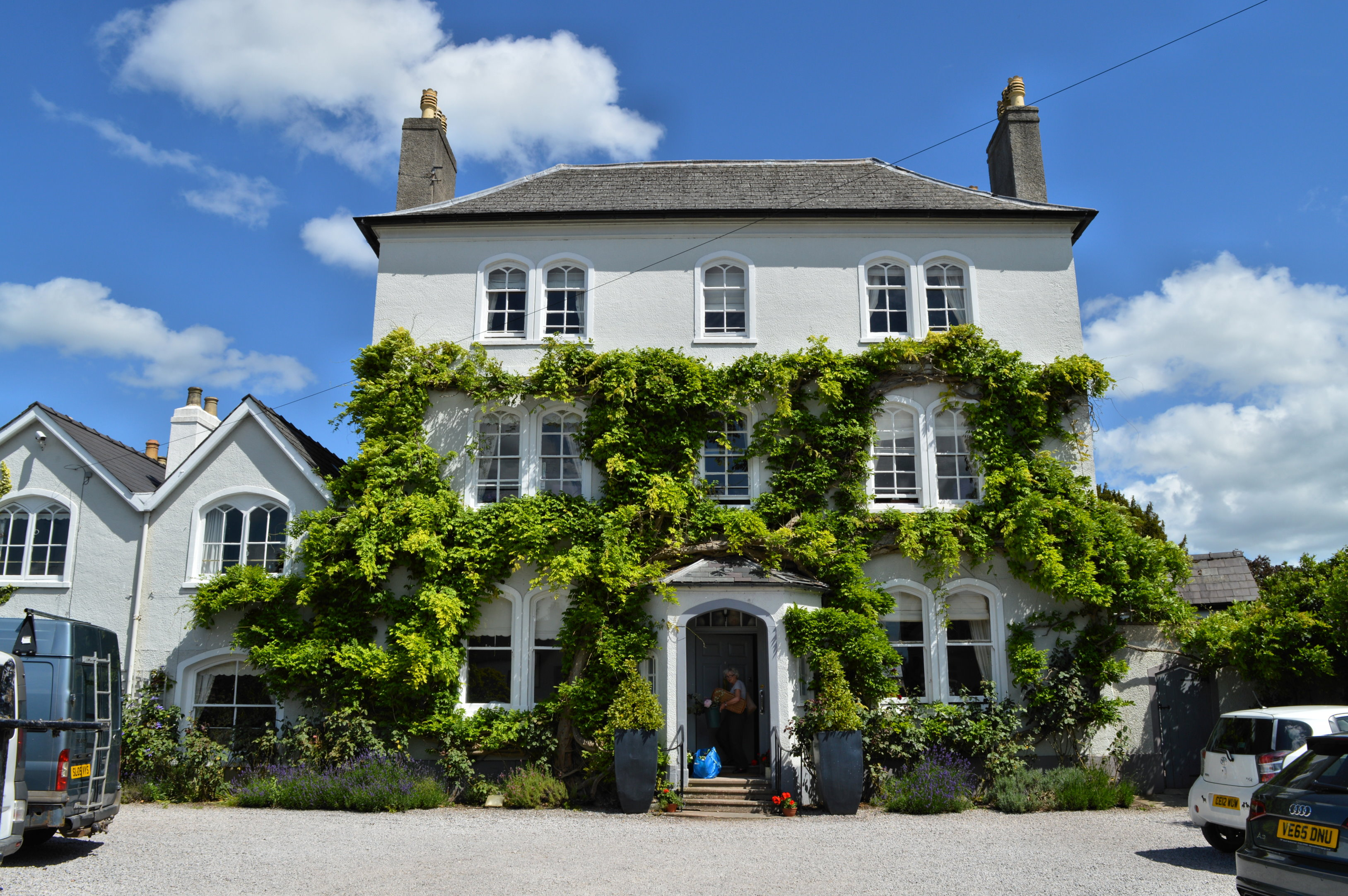
- Interactive map of the Parade House area
- Former names: The Harp Inn

General information
- Location: Monk Street, Monmouth, Wales
- Coordinates: 51.814888°N 2.712651°W
- Current tenants: Residential & care home

Design and construction
- Designations: Grade II listed

Parade House, is a Grade II listed building in Monk Street, Monmouth, Wales. The building is 18th-century in origin and has three storeys, gothicised windows, an ornate staircase and a hipped roof.

== History ==
The building was formerly an inn known as the Harp Inn in 1801 and consisted of two tenements. It was converted by a local banker in the mid-19th century. In 1839–1840, Captain Charles Harrison Powell was in residence when he served on the jury that convicted John Frost and two others for their part in the Chartist Newport Rising.

In 1915 the building and grounds were used as a Red Cross auxiliary hospital for convalescent wounded soldiers of World War I. Mr Arnott was a prime benefactor of the hospital. A total of 1,422 patients were treated between 1915 and 1919. The building was listed on 15 August 1974.

As of 2012, the building and grounds are currently used as a residential and care home.
