= Great Manson Farm, Monmouth =

Great Manson Farm
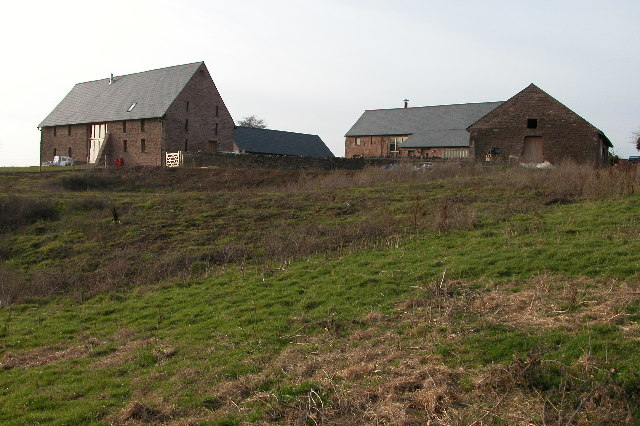
- Great Manson Farm
- Interactive map of the Great Manson Farm area

General information
- Type: Farmhouse; Barn; Cider House
- Location: Manson Lane, Monmouth, Wales
- Coordinates: 51.8362°N 2.7287°W

Design and construction
- Designations: Grade II Listed

Great Manson Farm is a property on the northern outskirts of Monmouth, Monmouthshire, Wales, in the Buckholt area. It is in the Manson Lane neighbourhood, within the electoral division of Dixton with Osbaston. During the course of the nineteenth and twentieth centuries, members of the Clarke, Goode, Clark, Dampier, and Morgan families resided at Great Manson Farm, at which time the reported size of the farm varied from 170 to 200 acres. The property is remarkable for the presence of three grade II listed buildings, including a barn with medieval origins.

== History and design ==
Great Manson Farm is located on the southwest side of Manson Lane on the northern outskirts of Monmouth, in the Buckholt area. The farm is south of Buckholt Wood, and was within Wye Bridge Ward at the turn of the nineteenth century. It is currently located within the electoral division of Dixton with Osbaston. The farm includes three Grade II listed buildings: the Great Manson farmhouse, the large barn, and the old cider house. The farmhouse was built in the eighteenth century, circa 1760.

However, the large barn was initially a stone structure from the late medieval period, circa 1450. While a hall and a passage from the medieval period still exist, the associated windows did not survive. In the hall, the post-medieval, circa 1600 ceiling and large fireplace with a stone lintel are still present. The stonework of the fireplace was modified in the eighteenth century. In the passage, early woodwork is gone; however, the late medieval, pointed arches of the doorways survive. The remains of the original structure were altered and enlarged in the eighteenth century to function as a barn, circa 1760. The barn was the subject of "A Historical Report on Great Manson Barn," written in 2003 and donated to the Royal Commission on the Ancient and Historical Monuments of Wales.

The old cider house is also referred to as the granary or mill house. It was built in 1763, and bears a stone on its gable end with that date. The cider house was constructed of red sandstone rubble. Its roof is of asbestos sheeting, and there is a central entrance flanked by windows. In addition, at the right gable end of the mill house, there are stone stairs up to a door with a small bay to the left. The ground floor features a rare, round, stone and wood cider mill. The building continued to function as a cider house into the middle of the twentieth century.

== Residents ==
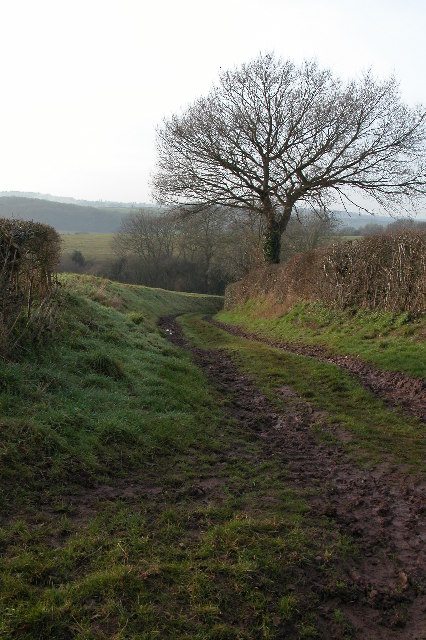
Green lane from Osbaston to Great Manson Farm

At the turn of the nineteenth century, Great Manson Farm belonged to the Misses Clarke. In 1841, James Goode, born around 1811, was the head of the farm. At the time of the 1851 Wales Census, Great Manson Farm was reported to be uninhabited. By 1861, James Clark, a native of Somerset, England, was the head of Great Manson Farm, the size of which was recorded as 170 acres. Nicholas Dampier, a 33-year-old native of Somerset, was the head of the 180 acre farm in 1871. The ostensibly two hundred acre Great Manson Farm was sold for £7750 on 13 September 1873.

In 1881, 62-year-old Lewis Morgan, a native of Breconshire, Wales, was the head of the farm, the record indicating that he was the farmer of 180 acres. The household included his son David Morgan, among other family members and employees. Morgan and his family had previously lived in Breconshire. By 1891, his son David appeared as the head of Great Manson Farm. Also a native of Breconshire, Wales, David Morgan was recorded at the farm in 1901 and 1911. He resided there for at least forty-two years, appearing in the 1923 Kelly's Directory of Monmouthshire. Since 1959 Great Manson Farm has been owned and farmed by the Miles family. Despite the conversion of the yard and traditional barns to residential dwellings, the farmhouse is still occupied by the family and Great Manson is run as a non intensive sheep farm.

== Twenty-first century ==
The Great Manson farmhouse was Grade II listed on 28 August 2002, as were the barn and cider house. Some of the buildings at Great Manson Farm have been redeveloped as residential housing. On 27 April 2011 and 3 May 2011, application was made to the Monmouthshire County Council to convert the listed old cider house/granary/mill house to a dwelling. This was unanimously declined by the Monmouth Town Council due to the archaeological value of the cider house and the persistent agricultural potential of adjacent buildings, however planning to convert the building to a dwelling was later granted at County planning level. In addition, on 3 May 2011, application was made to convert Brookholme Barn at Great Manson Farm to a residence, and to construct a garage/workshop. That request was approved.

== See also ==
- Wye Bridge Ward, Monmouth
- Buckholt, Monmouthshire
