= Buckholt, Monmouthshire =

Village in Monmouthshire, Wales

Coordinates: 51.836029°N 2.712636°W

Buckholt
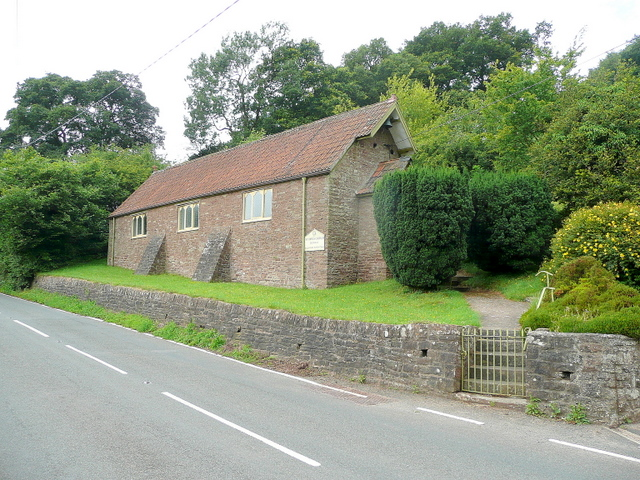
- St John's Church

- Location within Monmouthshire
- OS grid reference: SO510155
- Principal area: Monmouthshire
- Preserved county: Gwent
- Country: Wales
- Sovereign state: United Kingdom
- Post town: MONMOUTH
- Postcode district: NP25
- Dialling code: 01600
- Police: Gwent
- Fire: South Wales
- Ambulance: Welsh
- UK Parliament: Monmouth

Buckholt is a small village in Monmouthshire, Wales, located some 2 miles (3.2 km) north of Monmouth, adjoining the boundary with Herefordshire, England. It is a linear settlement situated in the valley of the Mally Brook along the A466 road between Monmouth and Hereford.

== History ==
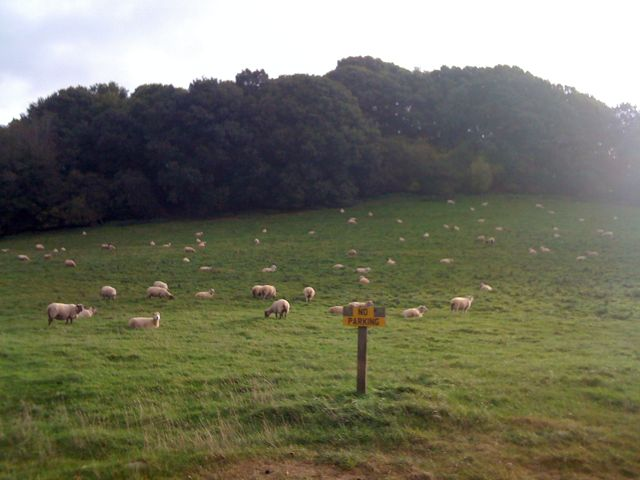
Grist Castle Wood

The name Buckholt derives from words meaning "beech wood", and much of the area around the village remains wooded on steeply sloping valley sides. The local woods contain evidence of Neolithic settlement, and Bronze Age and Roman material has also been found.

Grist Castle Wood, rising above the valley to the east and adjoining Orles Wood, is thought to have been the site of a small fortification commanding the strategically important road between Monmouth and Hereford. In 1248 the Buckholt area was owned by Monmouth Priory and the local lord John of Monmouth gave the monks certain rights and privileges in relation to the woodland. Buckholt Old Mill Farm is the site of a mediaeval corn mill owned by the Priory; the mill remained operational until the late 19th century.

The area came into the possession of the Duke of Beaufort in 1682. Houses built in the valley in the 18th and 19th centuries were mainly occupied by charcoal burners and were constructed from local timber and stone. Charcoal burning was an important local activity until the 1890s. Building stone was provided by local quarries, including Callow Quarry which produces red sandstone. Stone from the quarry was used to build Haberdashers' Schools in Monmouth and for restoring the town wall at Hereford. The quarry was taken over in 2007 by Black Mountain Quarries, based at Pontrilas, and remains operational.

== Buildings ==
The church of St. John was built in 1889. Its octagonal font is dated 1663 and is said to have come from St Peter's Church at nearby Dixton. A small school operated in a building opposite the church for 40 years after it was built in 1860. The Old Inn at Manson Cross was built in 1760 and is said to have been used by highwaymen. The Plough Inn at Buckholt was used by charcoal burners and millers. Both pubs have now been converted into private houses.

The village hall was built in 1929 by public subscription. It continues to host a wide range of village activities. Farms in the area include Great Manson Farm, southwest of Manson Lane.
