= Newton Court =

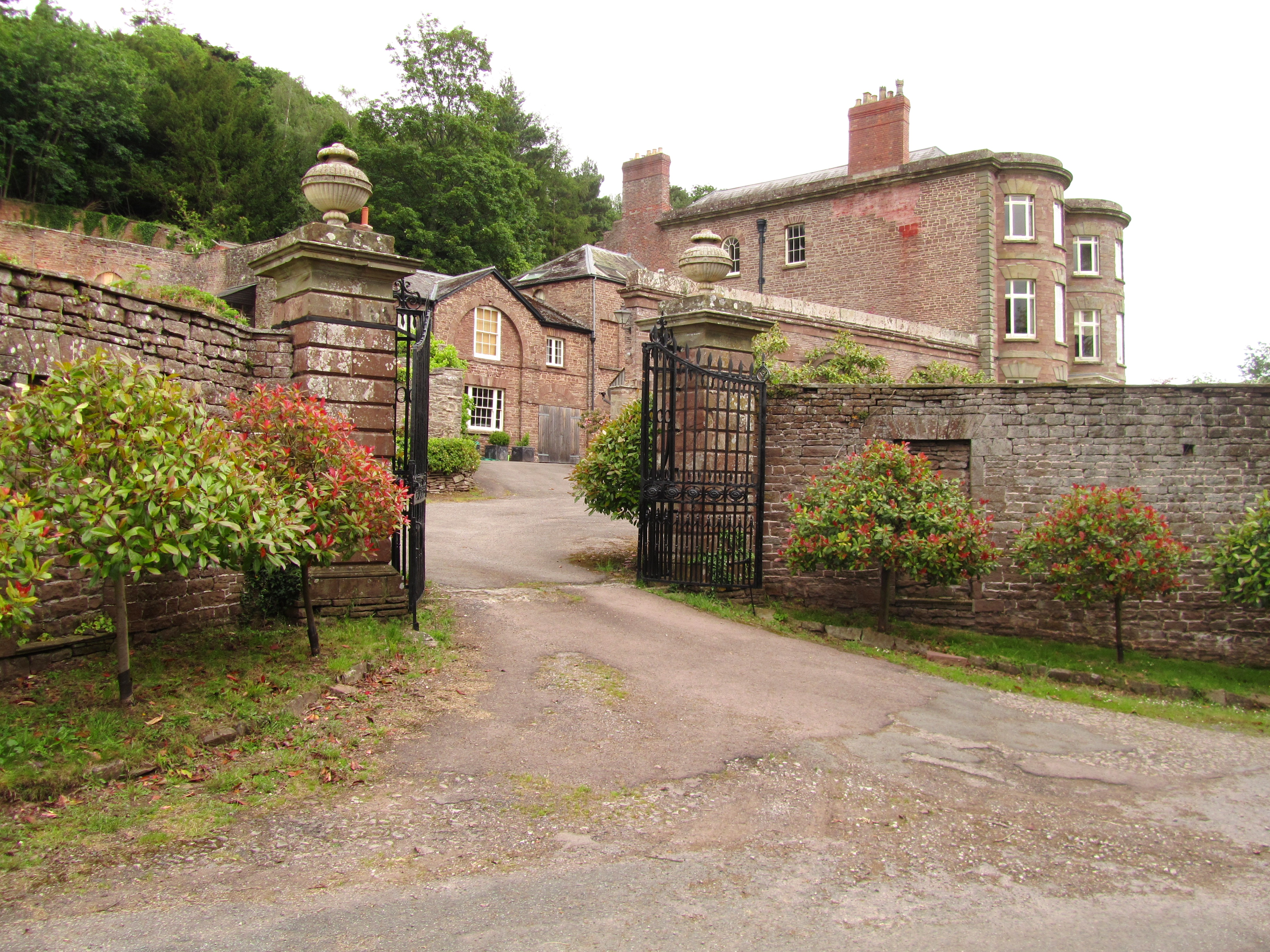

- Location within Monmouthshire

General information
- Architectural style: Neo-classical
- Location: Monmouth, Wales
- Coordinates: 51.8255°N 2.6943°W
- Elevation: 80 m (262 ft)
- Construction started: 1799
- Completed: 1802

Technical details
- Floor count: 3

Design and construction
- Architect: Anthony Keck

Newton Court is a neoclassical house, completed in 1802, situated on the hillside above Dixton, 1 mi (1.6 km) north-east of the town on Monmouth, in Monmouthshire, Wales. It is a Grade II* listed building. The stable block is listed as a Site of Special Scientific Interest (SSSI), noted for as a breeding site for lesser horseshoe bats.

== History ==
=== Early land use ===
The first major activity on the land, other than evidence of a few prehistoric flints, was in the medieval period, with pottery finds and indications of iron smelting. Domesday Book mentions that a mill might have been present in the area. Industry continued through to the post-medieval period, with kiln waste being found.

A 14th-century manor house was present in the area, possibly on the site of the present-day Newton Court.

=== Construction ===
The land for Newton Court, on a south-east facing hillside, was purchased by Admiral Thomas Griffin in the 18th century at the same time as the land at Hadnock and was left to his third son, George Griffin, after his death. Under George, Newton Court was constructed between 1799 and 1802, possibly to the designs of architect Anthony Keck of King's Stanley in Gloucestershire, who died prior to its commencement.

The three-storey house was built in the neoclassical style, using coursed red sandstone with Forest of Dean stone dressings and a slate roof.

=== Usage to present day ===
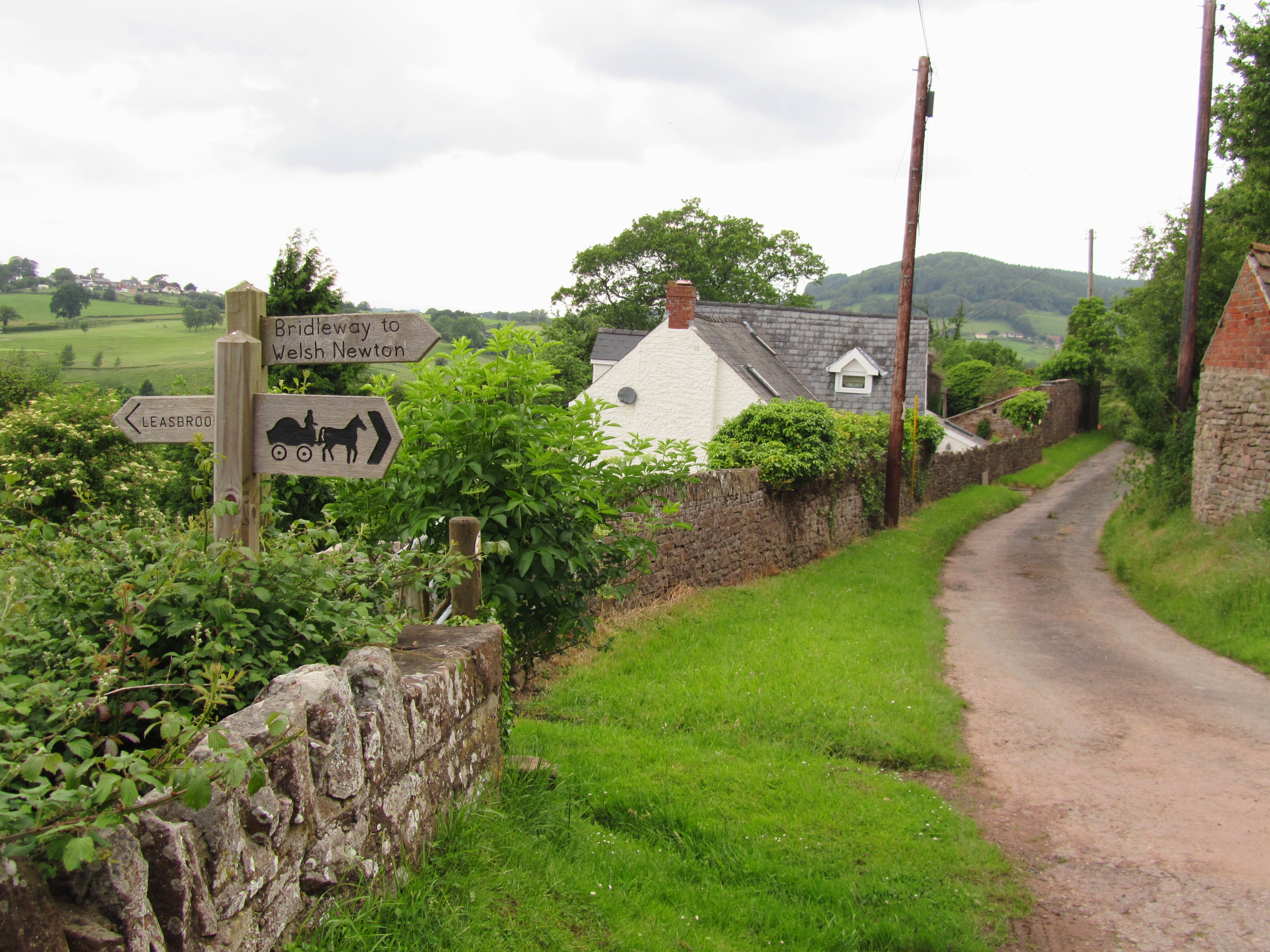
Newton Court Lane, leading to Newton Court Farm

The house remained in the Griffin family at least until 1901, when according to Kelly's Directory of Monmouthshire it was "the seat of George Griffin Griffin esq., M.A., D.L., J.P."

The house, stables, and screen wall were listed as Grade II* listed buildings in 2005, whilst the gate piers, gates, and wing walls were Grade II listed in the same year.

Newton Court Farm is situated at the end of Newton Court Lane and in between this and the house is the older 17th-century Newton Hall, which is a Grade II listed building.

== Stable Block ==
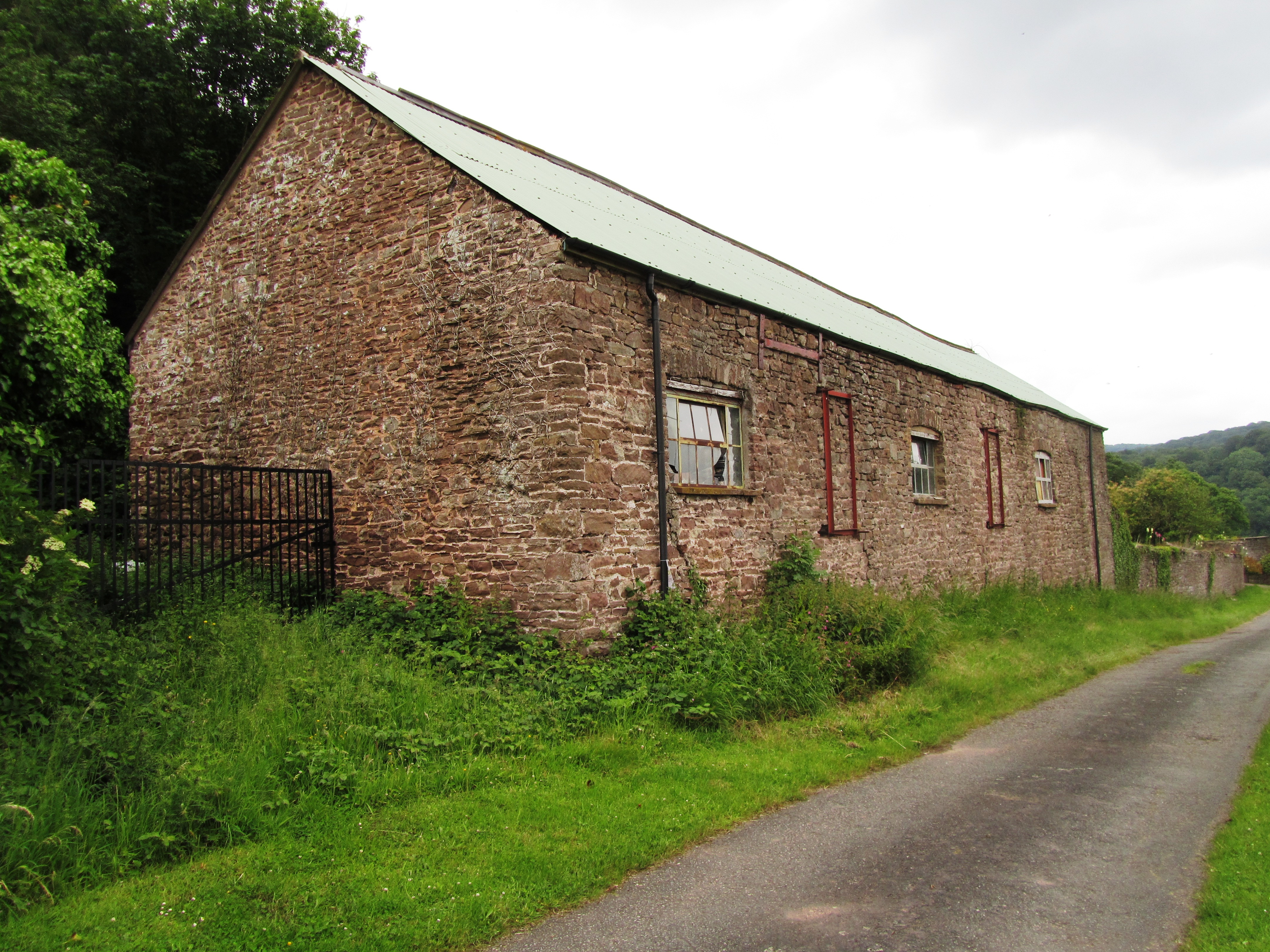
Newton Court Stable Block

Newton Court Stable Block is noted as a small SSSI, totalling 2.3 ha (5.7 acres) in area; it comprises the stable block, which is also a Grade II* listed building, the courtyard and neighbouring woodland. It is of importance because it is the only breeding colony in Monmouthshire for the nationally rare and endangered greater horseshoe bat (Rhinolophus ferrumequinum) and one of only three known sites in Wales. Between 50 and 100 adult and flying young have been recorded on the site, using the stable roof space for nesting. The stable block is also used by a few lesser horseshoe bats (Rhinolophus hipposideros). The SSSI forms part of the Wye Valley and Forest of Dean Bat Sites Special Area of Conservation.

The stable block building has previously undergone a number of temporary maintenance improvements, but as of 2012 is in a state of disrepair.
