= Iscoed =

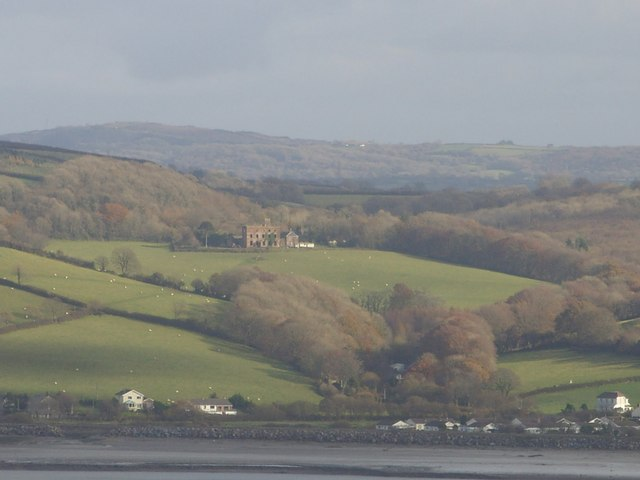
- Distant view of the derelict mansion

- Location within Wales
- 51.7812°N 4.3451°W
- Type: House
- Location: Ferryside, Carmarthenshire

History
- Built: 1772

Site notes
- Architect: Anthony Keck
- Architectural style: Georgian
- Governing body: Privately owned

Listed Building – Grade II
- Official name: Iscoed
- Designated: 3 May 1982
- Reference no.: 9732

Iscoed, Ferryside, Carmarthenshire, Wales is a ruined eighteenth century mansion attributed to the architect Anthony Keck. Constructed for Sir William Mansel in 1772, it was purchased by the Napoleonic general Sir Thomas Picton as an incomplete shell in 1812. The house remained the property of the Picton family until the end of the First World War. Used subsequently as council housing, it has been empty since the 1950s, and is now a derelict shell. The house is Grade II listed.

== History ==
The house was constructed for Sir William Mansel in 1772. The design is attributed to Anthony Keck, in part because Keck is known to have worked for the Mansel family elsewhere. Following Mansel's death in 1804, the unfinished shell, and surrounding estate, was bought by General Sir Thomas Picton in 1812. Picton soon regretted the purchase and made plans to sell the house, which were curtailed by his death at the Battle of Waterloo in 1815. The house remained the home of the Pictons until the early twentieth century. After a period as council-run housing, the building was abandoned after 1945 and was described at the time of listing in 1982 as a "roofless shell." Coflein states that renovation work was to begin at that time, but planning applications for redevelopment were being made in the early twenty-first century.

== Architecture ==
Pevsner considers Iscoed "one of the most important Georgian mansions of the county." Of three storeys and five bays, the main house is cuboid, with wings extending to each side. The brick construction of the house is unusual for its date and location, Pevsner notes its similarity to Whitson Court, Monmouthshire, another house attributed, at least in part, to Keck. White, Walford Davies and Melangell Dafydd are less complimentary of this feature, describing the house as; "this bare box of brick."
