= Monnow Mill =

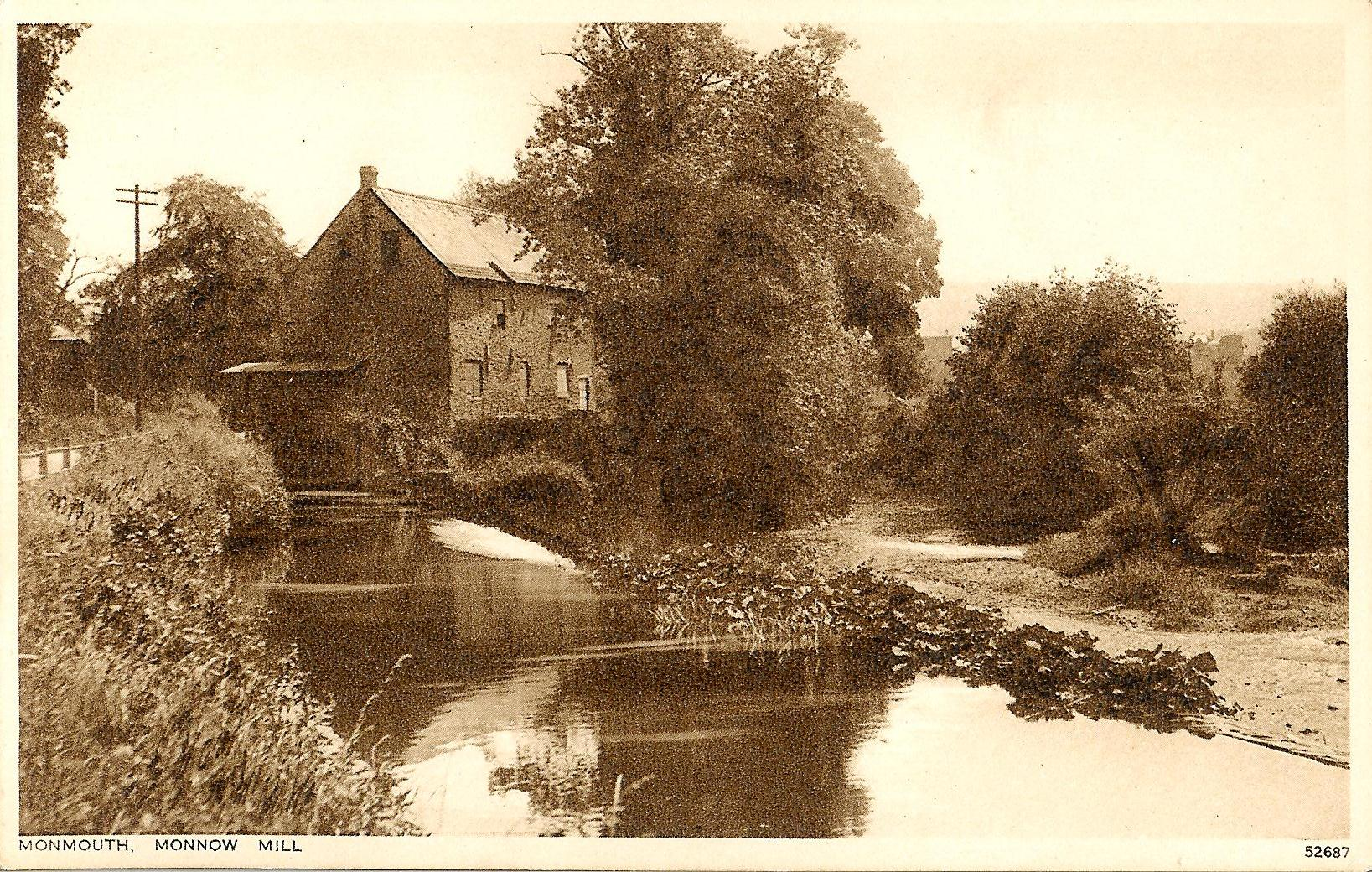
- The mill in 1940

- Location within Monmouthshire
- Former names: Queens Mills

General information
- Type: Former Mill
- Location: Osbaston Road, Monmouth, Wales
- Coordinates: 51.817986°N 2.716226°W
- Current tenants: Private House

Monnow Mill is a former watermill on the river Monnow in Osbaston on the Osbaston road in Monmouth, Wales. The building is now a private house. The mill was once known as Queens Mills. The building has been a Grade II Listed since 1974.

== History ==
The present four-storey house, dates from the early nineteenth century and still has a weir in the Monnow, with a very short leat. The building has a slate roof and it is now used as a dwelling. After 1895 two undershot wheels, measuring 3.6 m (12 ft) and 0.9 m (3 ft) drove four pairs of millstones and rollers.

The Mill was a corn mill, producing flour, for much of its existence dating back to 1448. However, in the early 20th century the mill was used as a machine shop, manufacturing small parts for cars and motorcycles such as Morris Motors

The Mill originally had a house and outbuildings on the opposite side of the road. These are now separate and are also private dwellings. Monnow Mill, house, mill and outbuildings were owned by the 9th Duke of Beaufort and formed part of his estate in 1901 when they were listed for auction.

== Gallery ==
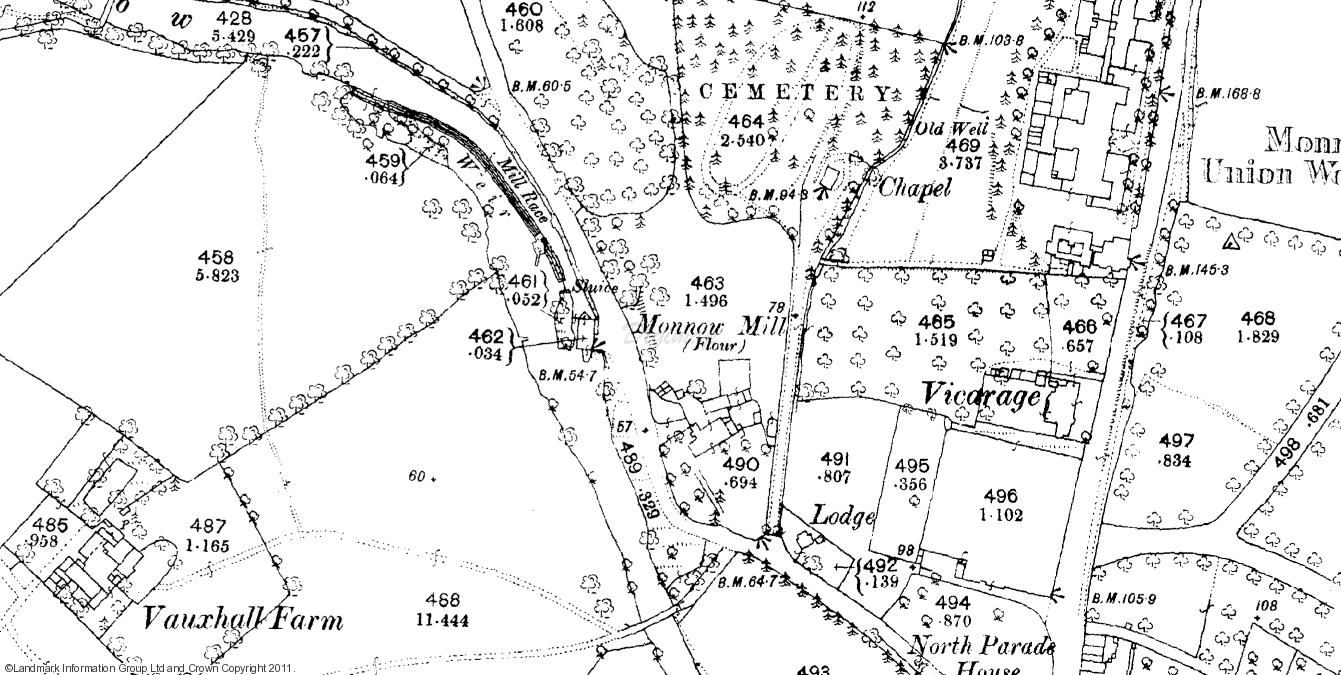
Monnow Mill OS Map 1880
