= Queens Head, Monmouth =

The Queens Head
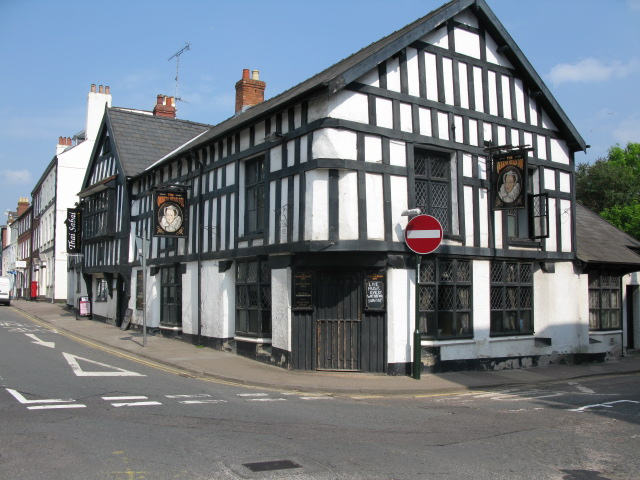
- Interactive map of the The Queens Head area

General information
- Type: Public House
- Location: 1 St James Street, Monmouth, Wales
- Coordinates: 51.8117°N 2.7101°W
- Completed: 16th Century

Design and construction
- Designations: Grade II listed building

Website
- www.queensheadmonmouth.co.uk

The Queens Head is a public house located at 1, St James Street, Monmouth, Wales. It has also known as The Queens Head Hotel and formerly Queens Head Inn.

== History ==
The building itself has been a Grade II listed building since 27 June 1952. The building dates back to around the Sixteenth Century. Original plaster work ceiling dating from 17th-century can be still seen near the bar. The building has undergone many changes since it was first built. The original stone has been plastered over and clad with stone in other locations. The profile was also changed by the removal of gables and a mock black and white wood work added in 1922 by H.A.Dancey.

The pub has some secret hiding places. During the English Civil War, Oliver Cromwell stayed at the Queens Head on a number of occasions. On one such occasion an attempt was made on his life, the would-be assassin being chased into the bar and shot dead.

In 2005 the Queens Head became a Community Pub. A group of local business people took over the pub with the aim of 'making the Queens a welcoming pub for all', offering live music and even a small library. The Pub is now run by just one of the original members.

== Gallery ==
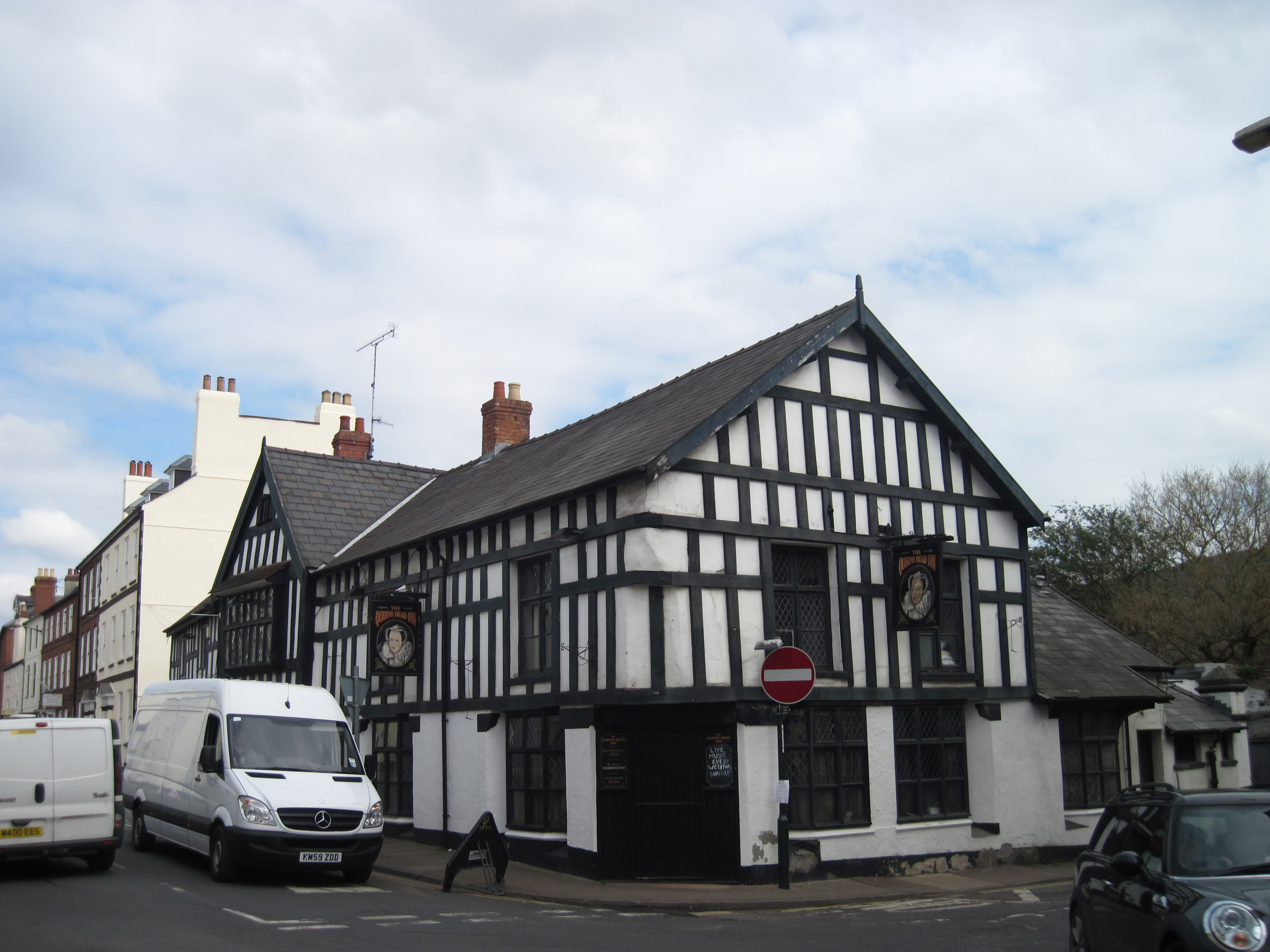

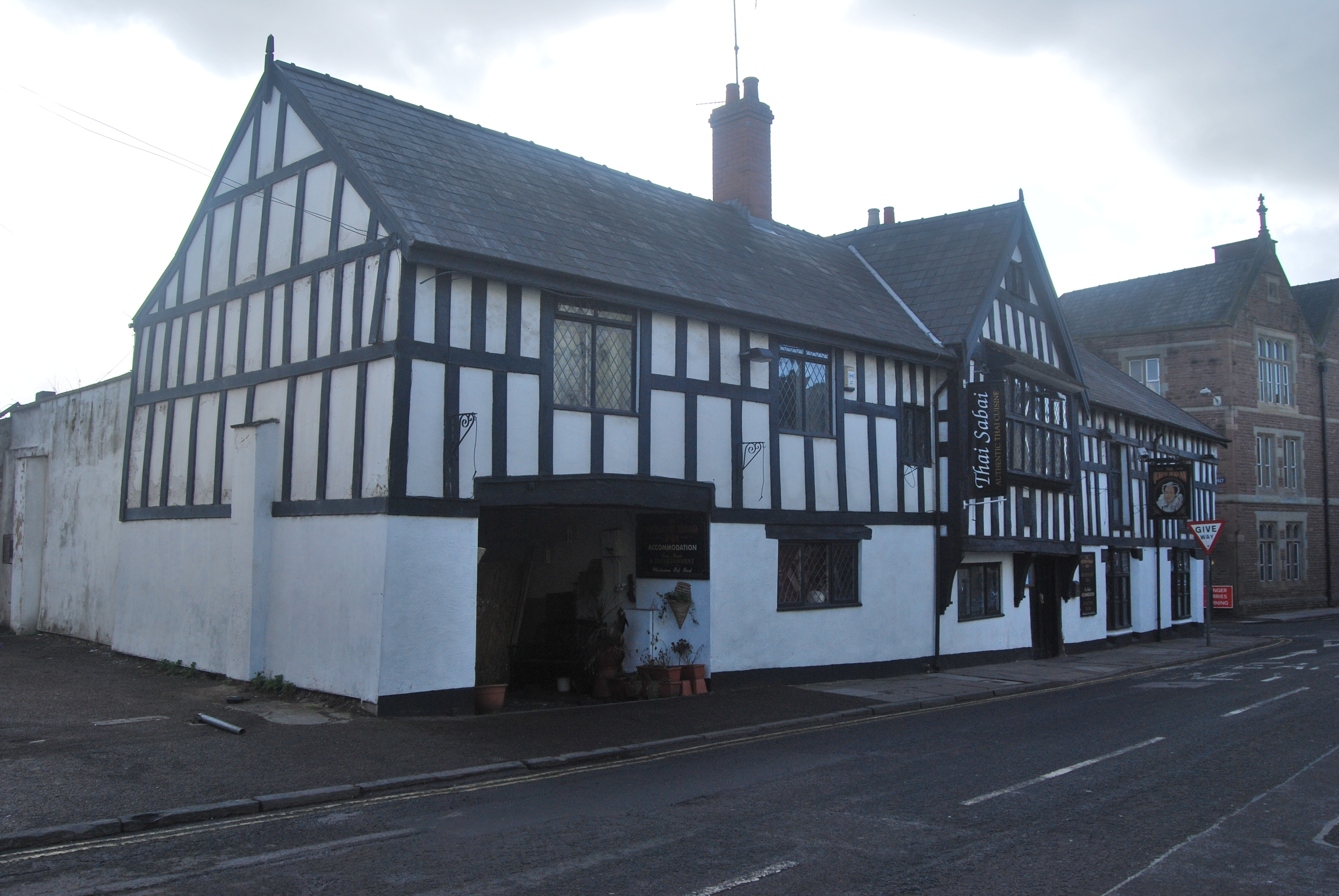
The Queens Head Monmouth

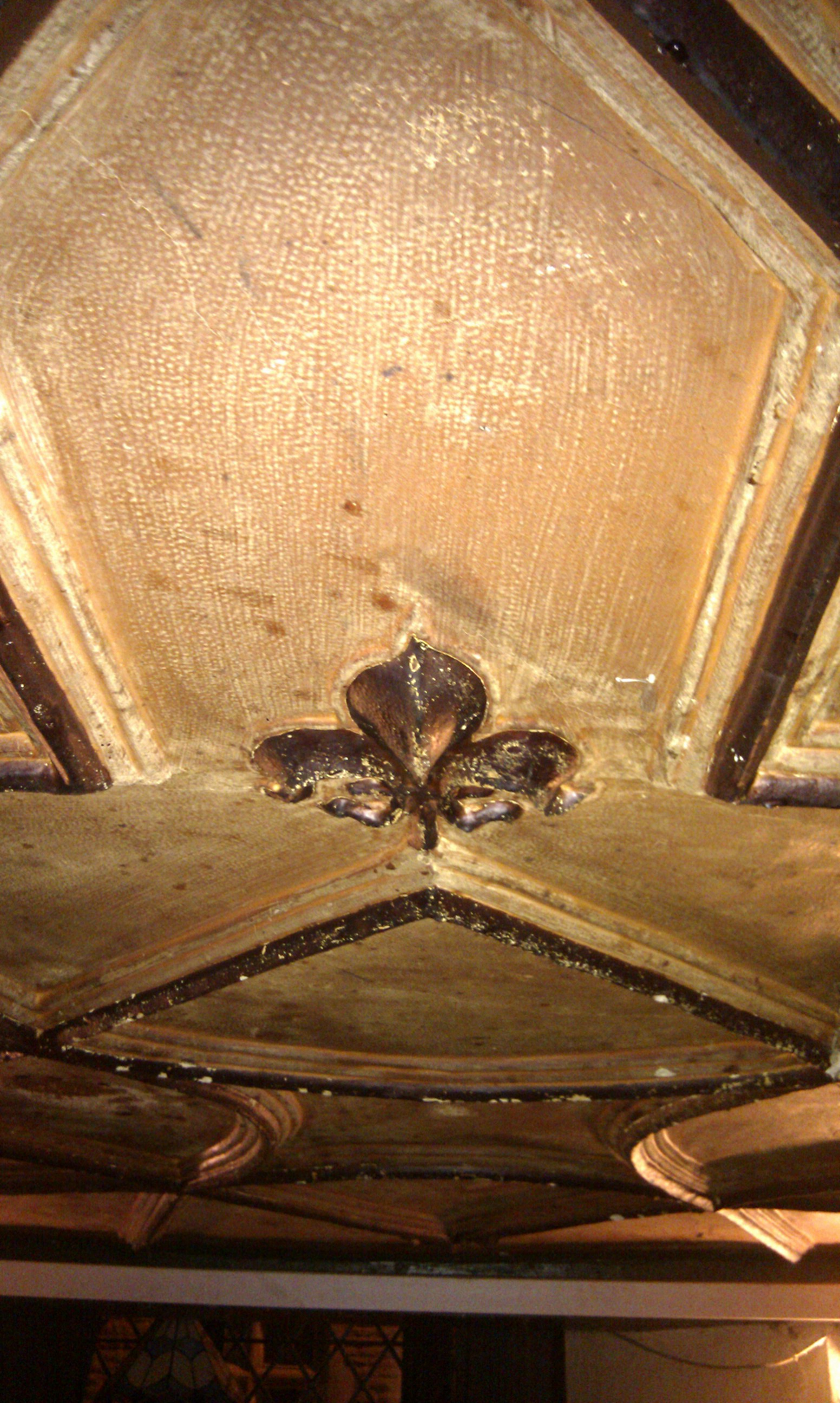
Queens Head - Original plaster work ceiling dating from 17th Century
