= Hadnock =

Coordinates: 51.828265°N 2.683475°W

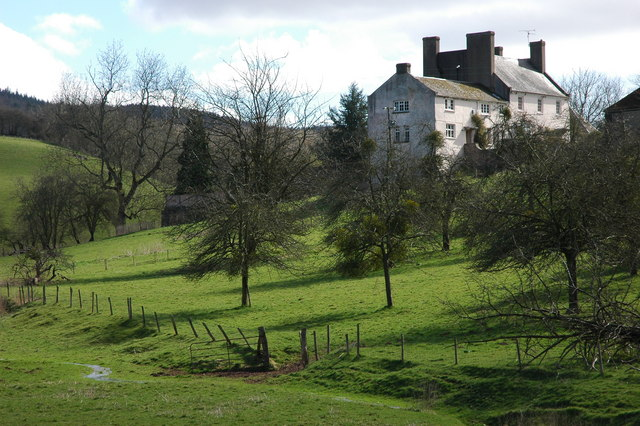
- Hadnock Court House

- Location within Monmouthshire
- OS grid reference: SO530146
- Principal area: Monmouthshire
- Preserved county: Gwent
- Country: Wales
- Sovereign state: United Kingdom
- Post town: MONMOUTH
- Postcode district: NP25
- Dialling code: 01600
- Police: Gwent
- Fire: South Wales
- Ambulance: Welsh
- UK Parliament: Monmouth

Hadnock is an area of farmland and woodland in Monmouthshire, Wales, 1.5 miles (2.4 km) north-east of Monmouth, on the east bank of the River Wye adjoining the border with England. It is located in the parish of Dixton, in the ancient manor of Hadnock, and is accessed from the road between Wyesham and Staunton. The area is thinly populated. The main properties are Hadnock Court House, a Grade II listed building originating in the 17th century, and Little Hadnock, a small hamlet which is located a few hundred yards to the north-east.

== History ==
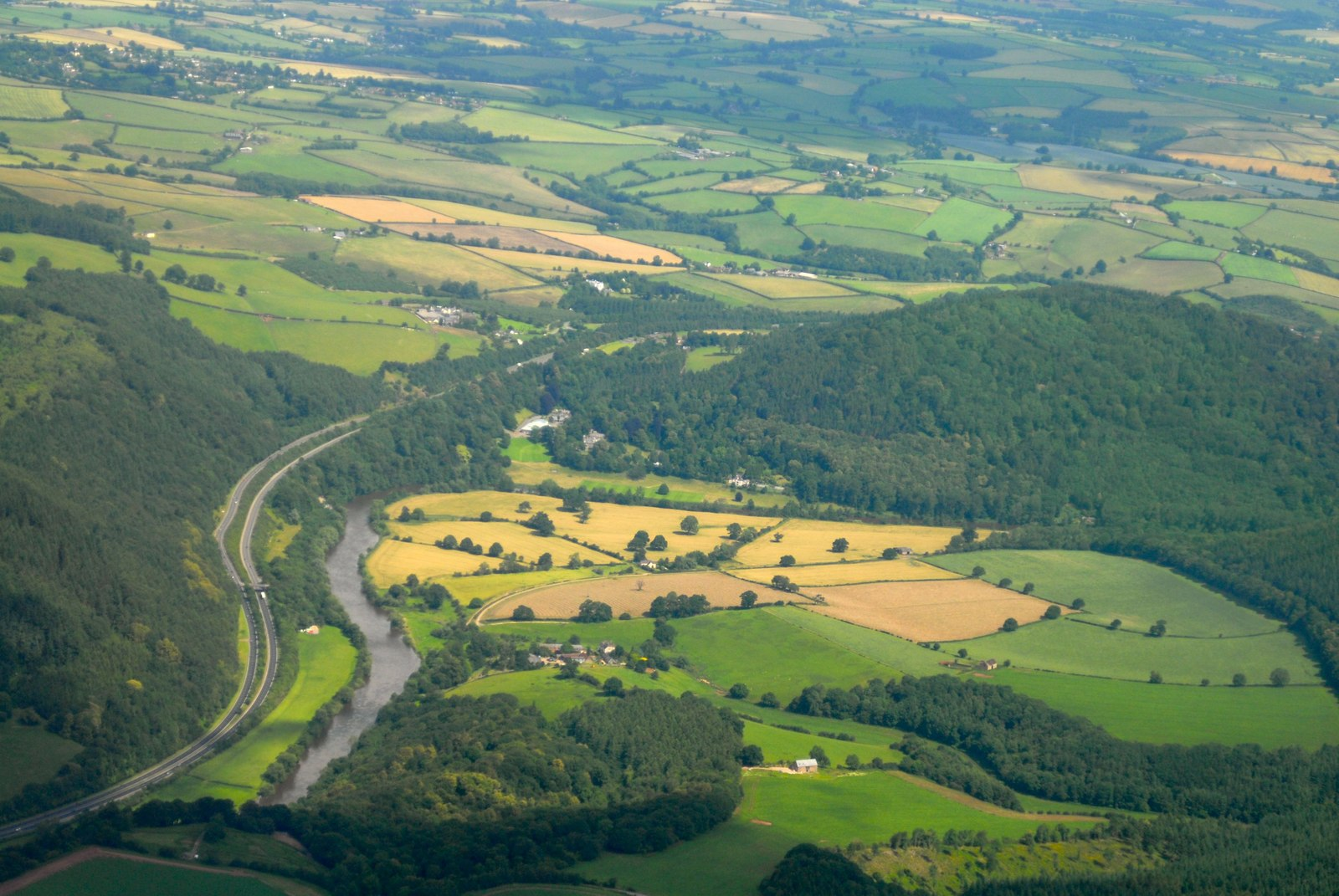
Aerial view looking north – the Hadnock area is the farmland in the centre foreground

=== Origin of the name ===
The name Hadnock may derive from English words meaning "Hodda's oak".

=== Early history ===
The Hadnock area, south of a bend in the River Wye, has been settled since at least Roman times. Excavations of a Roman villa in 1976 revealed a large complex of buildings, dating to the second and third centuries. Pottery from the site is predominantly from the 2nd to 4th centuries, but includes some native ware suggesting possible Iron Age settlement. There is also evidence of iron smelting and bronze working in the area in the Roman and mediaeval periods.

The land was granted by Withenoc, lord of Monmouth, to Monmouth Priory, before being taken back by his son Baderon in exchange for three forges. John of Monmouth later endowed it to the hospital he founded in the town. A 14th century map shows a manor in the area, and the field pattern still shows evidence of a medieval open field system. There is also an ancient hollow way forming the eastern boundary of the Lady Grove wood, known locally as the Royal Road and thought to have been one of the main exits from the Royal Forest of Dean; it may follow the line of a Roman road.

=== Later history ===
After the Dissolution of the Monasteries, the area became the seat of the Huntley family, later passing to the Herbert family. Charles Herbert of Hadnock was Member of Parliament for the Monmouth Boroughs in 1571. The estate passed in turn to the Duchy of Lancaster, and was eventually sold to Admiral Thomas Griffin. He died in 1771, and the house and estate, known as Hadnock House, or Hadnock Hall, passed to his second son. In the early 19th century, the house was owned by Dr. Griffin and his wife. The house was said to have stood "on the brow of one of those projecting eminences which bound the Wye" and possessed "every charm that wood and water in their happiest distribution can bestow", with a "beautiful view of the river".

After Dr. Griffin died without an heir, the Hadnock estate was purchased by Richard Blakemore in 1822. He demolished the original Hadnock House, and used the materials to rebuild and extend his property on the other side of the River Wye at Wyastone Leys. In 1825, all that was left of Hadnock House were some remains.

In the 1860s, part of the Ross and Monmouth Railway, later a branch of the Great Western Railway, was built through the estate, with a halt at Hadnock. The line closed in 1965 and was dismantled; part is now a public right of way.

== Hadnock Court ==
The current Hadnock Court, also known as Hadnock Court House and formerly as Hadnock Farm, is a large building which appears to have taken the name of its demolished predecessor. It dates to the early 17th century, although there have been both alterations and extensions until the 20th century. Hadnock Court is a slate roofed, Grade II listed building which has been rendered to cover the original stone work. Several of the associated farm buildings, and the gate piers and gates to the Court, are also listed buildings.
