= Anthony Keck (architect) =

English architect

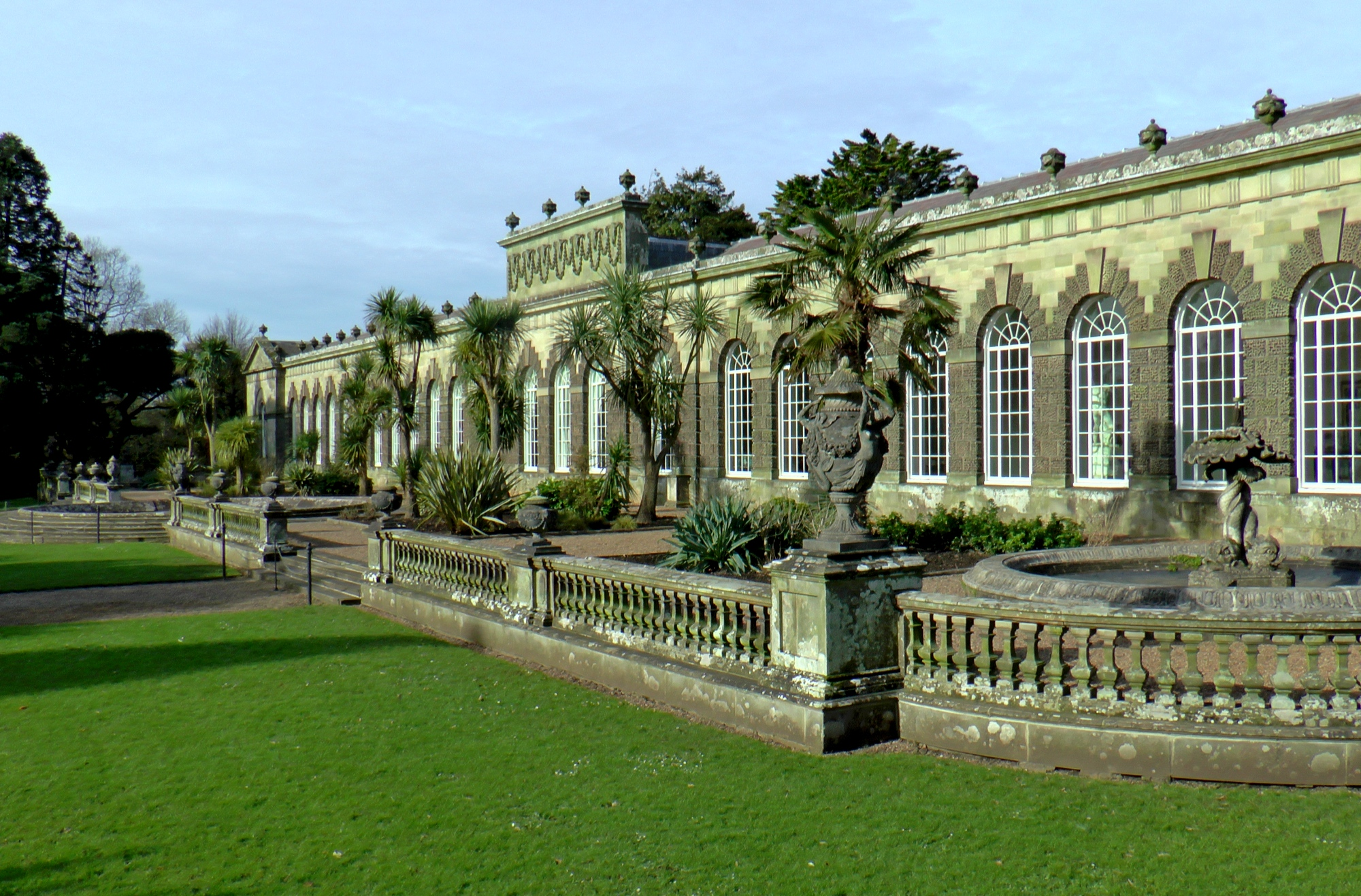
- The Orangery at Margam Park in Wales – Keck's most important work
- Born: 1726; Randwick, Gloucestershire, England
- Died: 1797 (aged 69–70); King's Stanley, Gloucestershire, England
- Occupation: Architect
- Buildings: Margam Park; Highgrove House; Moccas Court

Anthony Keck (1726–1797) was an 18th-century English architect with an extensive practice in Gloucestershire, Worcestershire, Herefordshire and South Wales.

== Life ==
Keck was born at Randwick, Gloucestershire in 1726. He designed in the "austere Neoclassical style of the late eighteenth century – a provincial follower of Robert Adam."

He died on 4 October 1797 at the age of seventy, at Beech House, the home he partly designed for himself, in the village of King's Stanley, Gloucestershire, where he had his workshop and studio for most of his life. He is buried in St George's Church in the village.

== Works ==
Keck is credited with designing some fifty country houses in the South-West of England and South Wales. His works include:

- Longworth Hall, Herefordshire
- Barnsley Park, Cirencester, Gloucestershire
- Burghill Court, Herefordshire
- Flaxley Abbey, Forest of Dean, Gloucestershire
- Forthampton Court, Gloucestershire
- Ham Court, Upton-upon-Severn, Gloucestershire, demolished 1926
- Highgrove House, Tetbury, Gloucestershire
- Iscoed, Carmarthenshire
- Margam Park, Glamorgan
- Moccas Court, Herefordshire
- Newton Court, Dixton, Monmouthshire
- Penrice Castle, Glamorgan
- Slebech Park, Pembrokeshire
- Stratford Park, Stroud, Gloucestershire
- Whitfield House, Wormbridge, Herefordshire
- Wormington Grange, Tewkesbury, Gloucestershire
- Underdown, Ledbury, Herefordshire

Keck's work was not confined to country houses, including churches, such as Old St Martin's, Worcester and St Peter and St Paul's, Upton-upon-Severn, including its famed lantern and cupola; public buildings, such as the Worcester Royal Infirmary and contributions to the Stroudwater canal.

== Gallery of architectural work ==
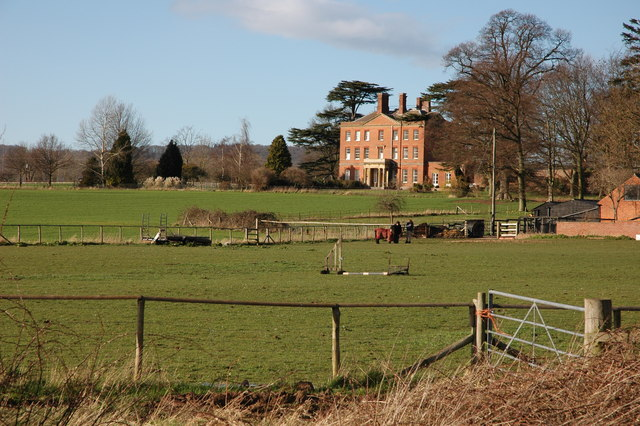
Burghill Court

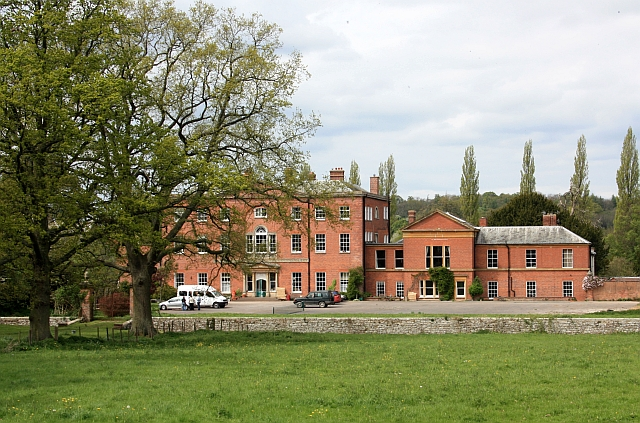
Canon Frome Court

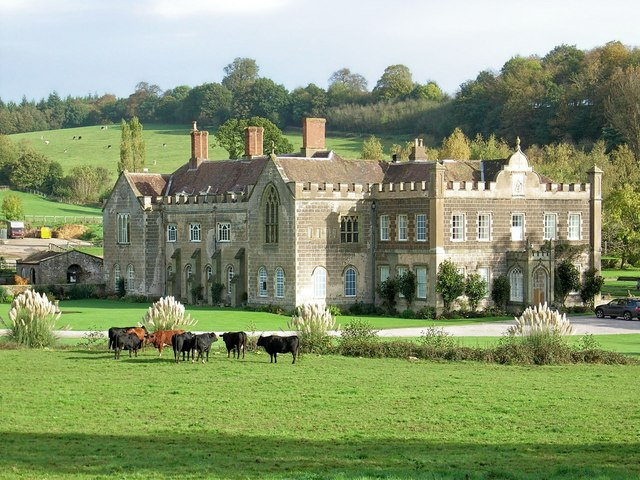
Flaxley Abbey

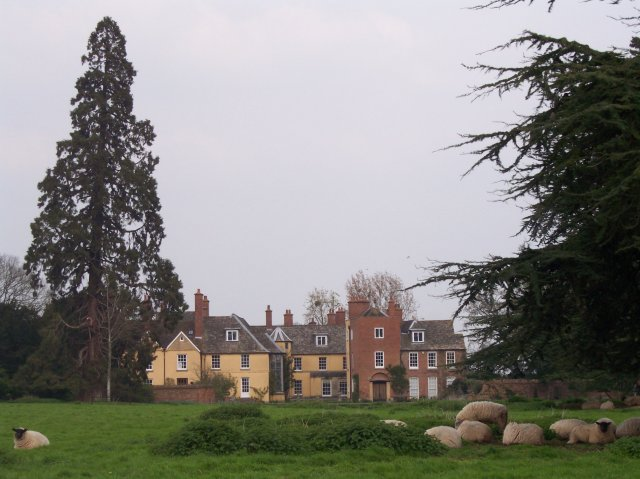
Forthampton Court

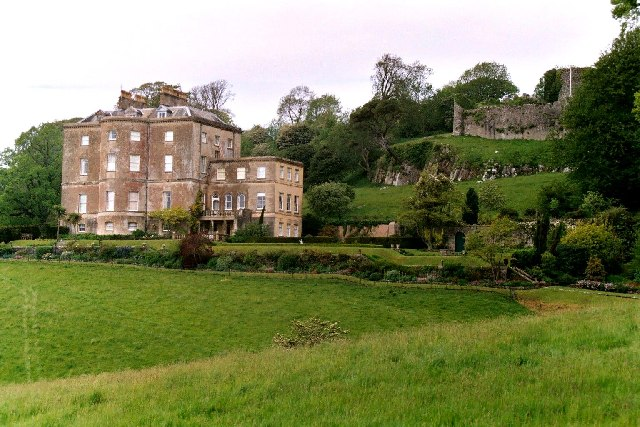
Penrice Castle

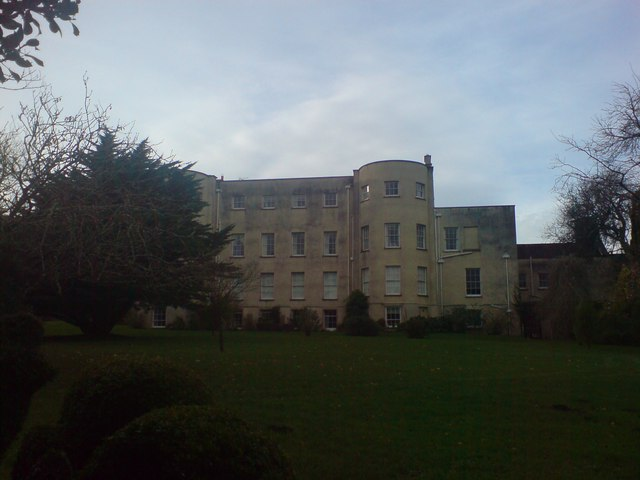
Slebech Park

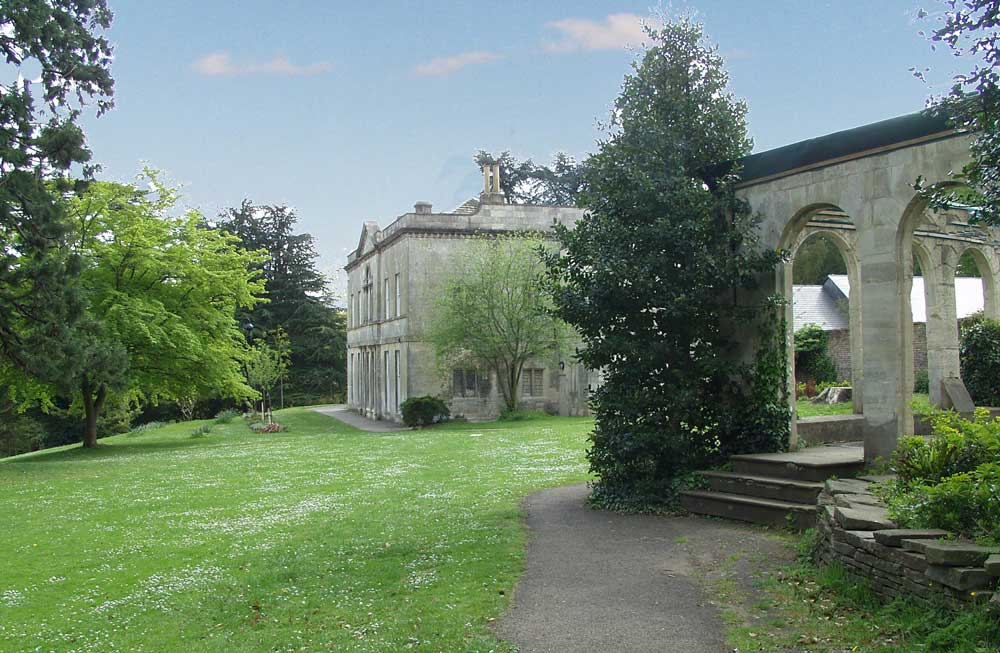
Stratford Park

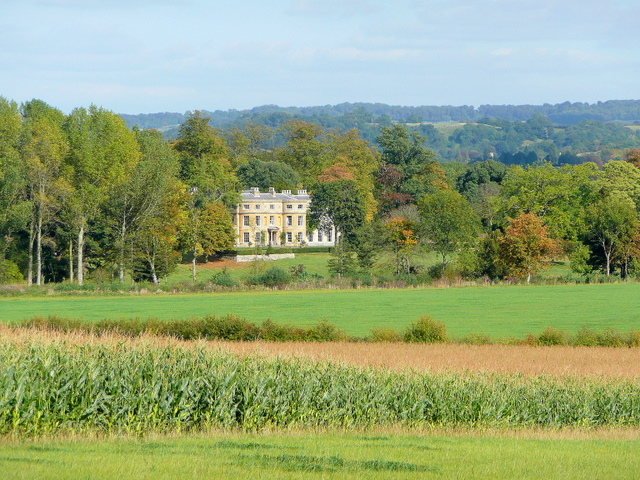
Wormington Grange

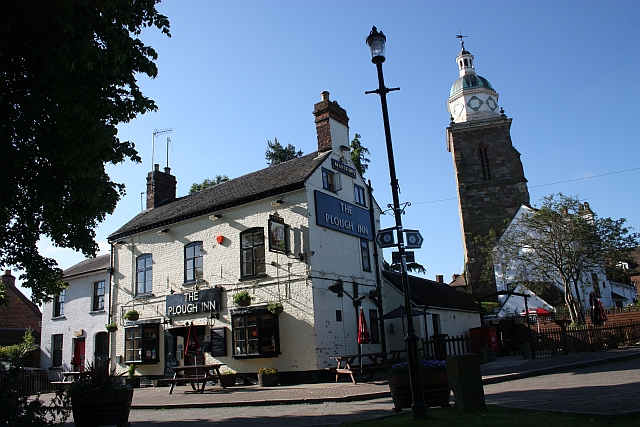
The tower of St Peter and St Paul, Upton-upon-Severn

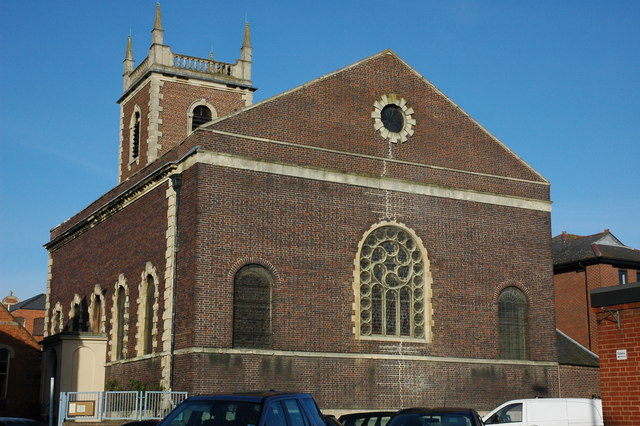
Old St Martin's Church, Worcester
