= St James Street, Monmouth =

Street in Monmouth, Wales

St James Street
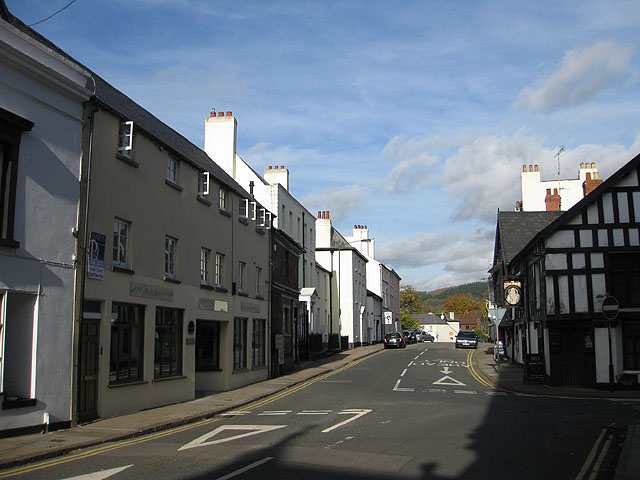
- St James Street with Queens Head to the right
- Interactive map of St James Street
- Location: Monmouth, Wales
- Coordinates: 51.8124°N 2.7115°W
- North: St James Square
- South: Almshouse Street

St James Street is a historic street in the town centre of Monmouth, Monmouthshire, Wales. It appears as a segment of Whitecross Street on the 1610 map of the town by cartographer John Speed and is within the medieval town walls. On more recent maps, it extends from St James Square southwest to Almshouse Street. In 2010, the street was the site of discovery of Mesolithic era artefacts. St James Street is lined with numerous listed buildings.

== History and location ==
By the 14th century, a portion of the street plan of Monmouth had been determined. St James Street is located within the medieval walls of the town, built around 1300. It is depicted on the map of Monmouth (pictured below) created by John Speed in 1610. However, it is not referred to as St James Street on the map. Rather, as discussed by author William Meyler Warlow in 1899, Whitecross Street extended from Church Street all the way to Weirhead Street. Not only was St James Street part of Whitecross Street, so was Almshouse Street. St James Street is a more recent title. Further, the author relates that Whitecross Street derived its name from a white cross which was positioned in the future St James Square near the Dispensary. Inspection of Speed's map reveals the symbol of a cross near East Gate (Dixton Gate), at the expected level of St James Square.

St James Street intersects with the eastern end of St James Square, extending southwest to continue as Almshouse Street. The southern portion intersects with Wyebridge Street from the east. Beyond that, the southern tip of the street also intersects with St Mary's Street from the west. The buildings along the northwest side of St James Street are somewhat more ornate than those on the opposite side. On 8 November 2010, the BBC News reported that during the course of gas main replacement work at nearby St James Square and Wyebridge Street, Mesolithic era artefacts, including flints, were excavated (link to photograph of flints below). This represented the first discovery of Mesolithic human settlement in Monmouth. An article by Sion Morgan of the Western Mail which also ran on 8 Nov 2010 in Wales Online suggested that similar artefacts were found in St James Street as well.

== The buildings ==
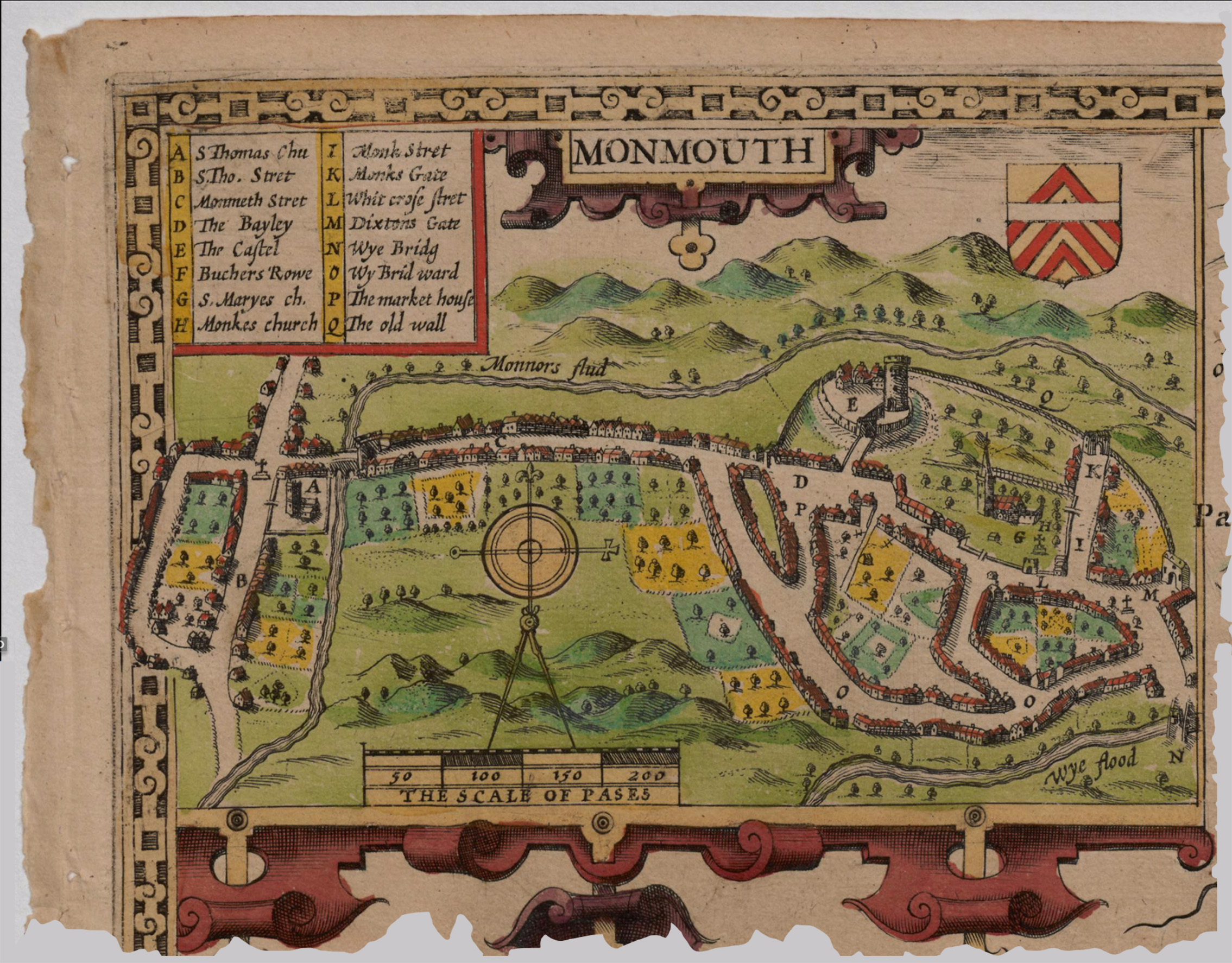
1610 Map of Monmouth by John Speed with symbol of cross near Dixton Gate (labeled M)

The Queens Head at 1 St James Street is a 16th or 17th-century, grade II listed building. While the Royal Commission on the Ancient and Historical Monuments of Wales and author John Newman indicate that it was constructed in 1630, other sources suggest that it was built in the 16th century. Oliver Cromwell (25 April 1599 – 3 September 1658) is reputed to have frequented the accommodations at the Queens Head, and to have been the object of an assassination attempt at the inn. The building, which is on the southeast side of the street, was renovated in 1922. At that time, it received a timbered facade from Harry A. Dancey of Gloucester. The oriel window was present before the 1922 updating. The interior has an early 17th-century plaster ceiling. The building was listed on 27 June 1952, in part for the nature of its east gable end. In 2005, a group of Monmouth business people entered into a joint venture and assumed the tenancy of the building to form a community pub. The Queens Head currently serves as a public house, live music venue, restaurant, and bed and breakfast, and is run by only one member of the original, 2005 group.

Clent House at 5 St James Street is a late 18th-century, grade II listed building. The three-storey, brick house is remarkable for a pedimented, Doric entrance with a fanlight. The slate roof has a single dormer. The building was grade II listed on 27 June 1952.

The Grange at 12-16 St James Street consists of three connected buildings, all grade II listed, on the northwest side of the street. The three-storey, five-bay, main building features a pedimented, Doric entrance with a transom and a firemark. The 18th-century, listed building has a slate roof. The Grange, until recently one of the schools of the Haberdashers' Company, has served as a preparatory school for boys ages seven to eleven. In August 2010, the Monmouthshire County Council released details of an application to convert the prep school to a boarding house. In December 2010, it was announced that permission for the redevelopment of the school as a boarding house had been granted. The conversion of The Grange is a component of the first phase of The Heart Project, a substantial renovation of Monmouth School which has recently been undertaken. The new boarding house opened in September 2011.

18 St James Street, on the northwest side of the street, is described by author Newman as "something out of the ordinary." The 19th-century, three-storey building features a pedimented entrance with a radiating bar fanlight. The Ionic columns have angled volutes and the door is asymmetrically positioned.

The Hame on St James Street is also referred to as Kingdom Hall in one record. The early 19th-century, two-storey, listed building has a stucco exterior and a slate roof. It was grade II listed on 27 June 1952.

Kingdom Hall, a listed building on St James Street, is home to the Jehovah's Witnesses.

The Monmouth Methodist Church, also referred to as the Wesleyan Methodist Chapel, wasn't built until 1837, although the congregation had purchased a parcel of land at St James Street for £500 at the turn of the 19th century. At that time, various Monmouth congregations were outgrowing their chapels. The building was designed by architect George Vaughan Maddox, who utilized a similar design for the Masonic Hall on Monk Street in 1846. By law, denominations that were considered to be Nonconformist were required to site their buildings in an inconspicuous area behind buildings along the street. The Methodist chapel was considered Nonconformist and, therefore, was set back from the street. (The regulation may have initially been enacted to target Catholics.) The building underwent renovation of its interior in 1885, including raising of the floor, to reduce the dominance of the pulpit. The Methodist chapel has a classical design with a gable entrance. The exterior is stucco, and there is a pedimented facade with a three-bay elevation, and Ionic columns at the ground and upper levels. The ground level windows are rectangular and pedimented, while the upper-level windows are round-headed. The interior features Ionic columns, a prominent pulpit, coved ceilings, and high windows. The building was grade II* listed on 27 June 1952. Listing information indicates that it has "exceptional architectural interest as an important historic building with a well preserved interior." In September 2011, the Monmouth Methodist Church was one of the participants in "Open Doors 2011, European Heritage Days in Wales," welcoming members of the community into their facilities.

21 St James Street is a 19th-century, listed building. The three-storey, one bay elevation features an exterior which is stucco on the ground floor and roughcast on the upper levels. The entrance is to the right, with a canted bay to the left.

23 and 25 St James Street were grade II listed on 15 August 1974.

== Gallery ==
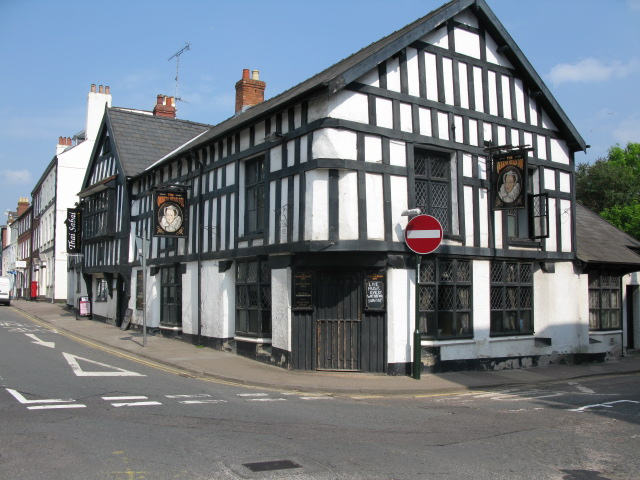
Queens Head,
1 St James Street

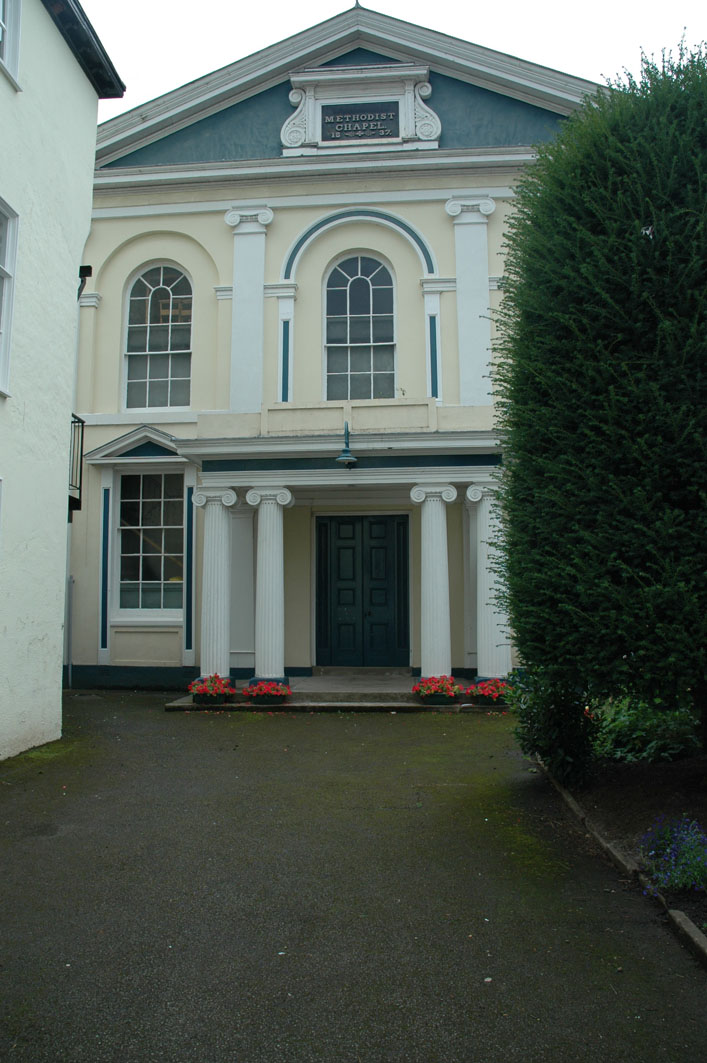
Methodist Church,
St James Street

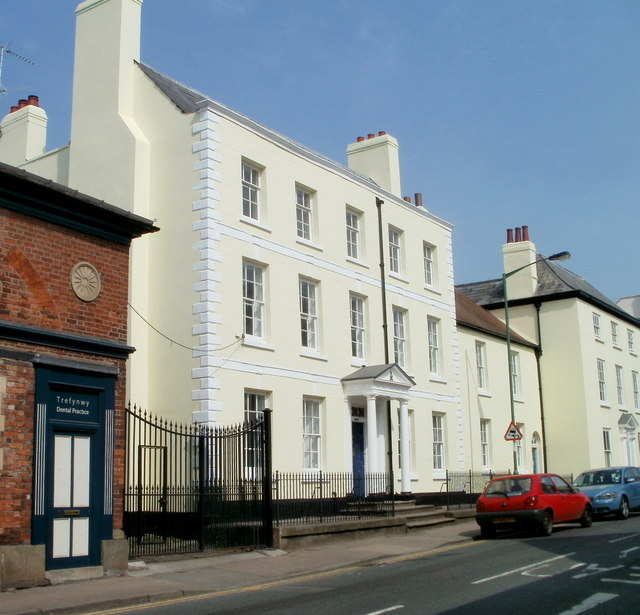
The Grange,
12-16 St James Street
