= Thomas Griffin (Royal Navy officer) =

Admiral Thomas Griffin
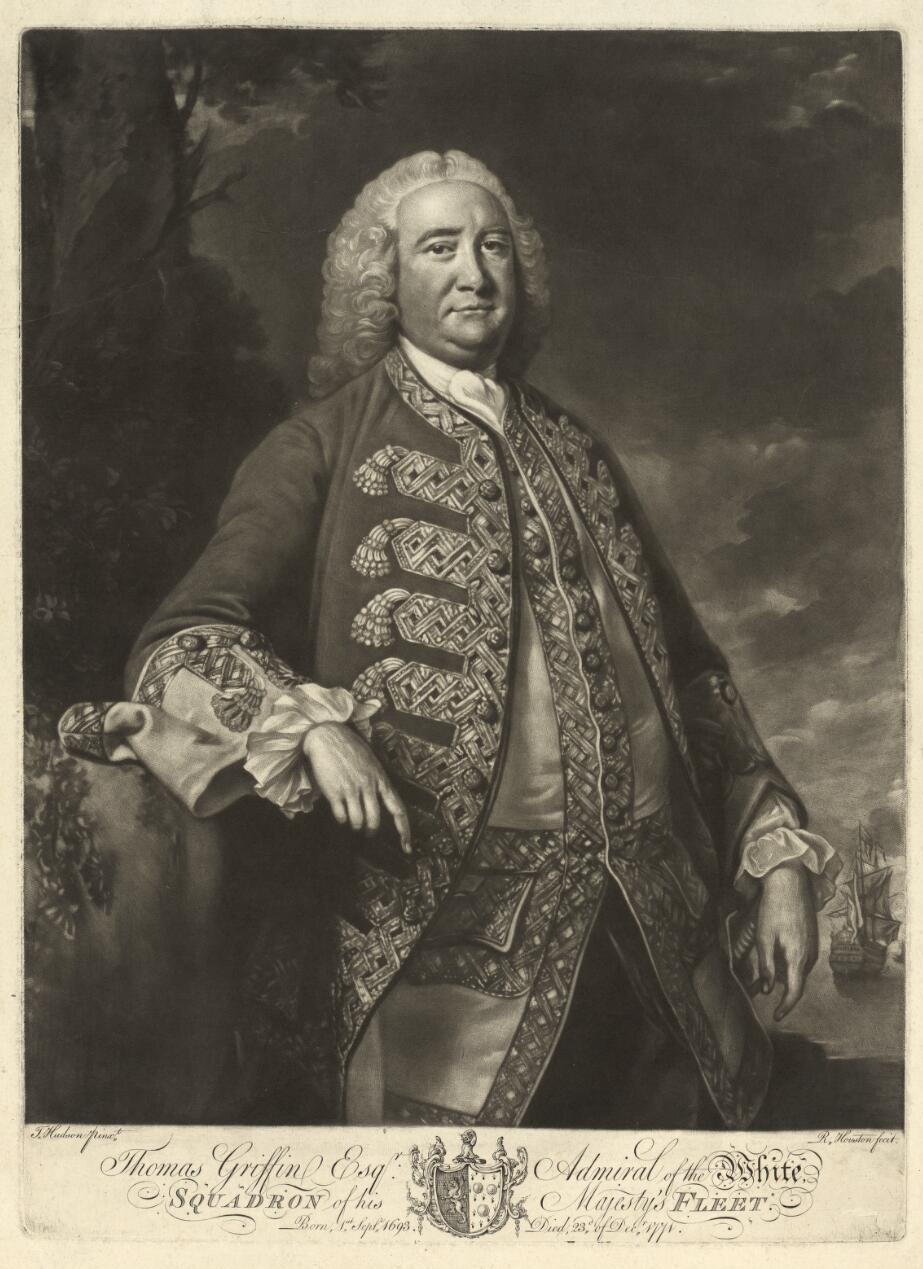
- Thomas Griffin, Admiral of the White
- Born: c. 1692
- Died: 23 December 1771
- Military career
- Allegiance: Kingdom of Great Britain
- Branch: Royal Navy
- Rank: Admiral
- Commands: HMS Shoreham; HMS Blenheim; HMS Oxford; HMS Princess Caroline; HMS Burford; HMS St George; HMS Captain; East Indies Station
- Conflicts: War of Jenkins' Ear; Seven Years' War

Admiral Thomas Griffin (c. 1692 – 23 December 1771) was a Royal Navy officer who served in the War of Jenkins' Ear. He later became Commander-in-Chief of the East Indies Station.

== Early life ==
Griffin was said to have belonged to a younger branch of the family of Lord Griffin of Braybrooke, which merged in that of Lord Howard of Walden. He is described as being of the parish of Dixton Hadnock in Monmouthshire.

== Naval career ==
He joined the Royal Navy in 1718 as third lieutenant of HMS Orford. He was given command of HMS Shoreham in 1731, HMS Blenheim in 1735, HMS Oxford in 1738 and HMS Princess Caroline in 1739. In 1741 he commanded HMS Burford at the Battle of Cartagena de Indias in Spring of that year. In September 1742 he was involved in an incident whereby he evicted some of his officers from their cabins to accommodate some passengers: considerable acrimony followed. He went on to command HMS St George from later in 1741 and HMS Captain from 1743. While in command of the latter ship he was involved in an incident whereby he was accused of engaging a small French vessel and ignoring two much larger enemy ships; his explanations were accepted at the time but revisited later.

He was appointed Commander-in-Chief of the East Indies Station in 1746. After reinforcing Fort St. David near Cuddalore in March 1747, he was promoted to rear-admiral of the red in July 1747, promoted to vice-admiral of the blue in May 1748 and then sailed back to England in January 1749. On his return his judgement was again questioned, he was court-martialled and found guilty of negligence. After his court martial George II reinstated him and he was promoted to admiral of the white.

== Later life ==
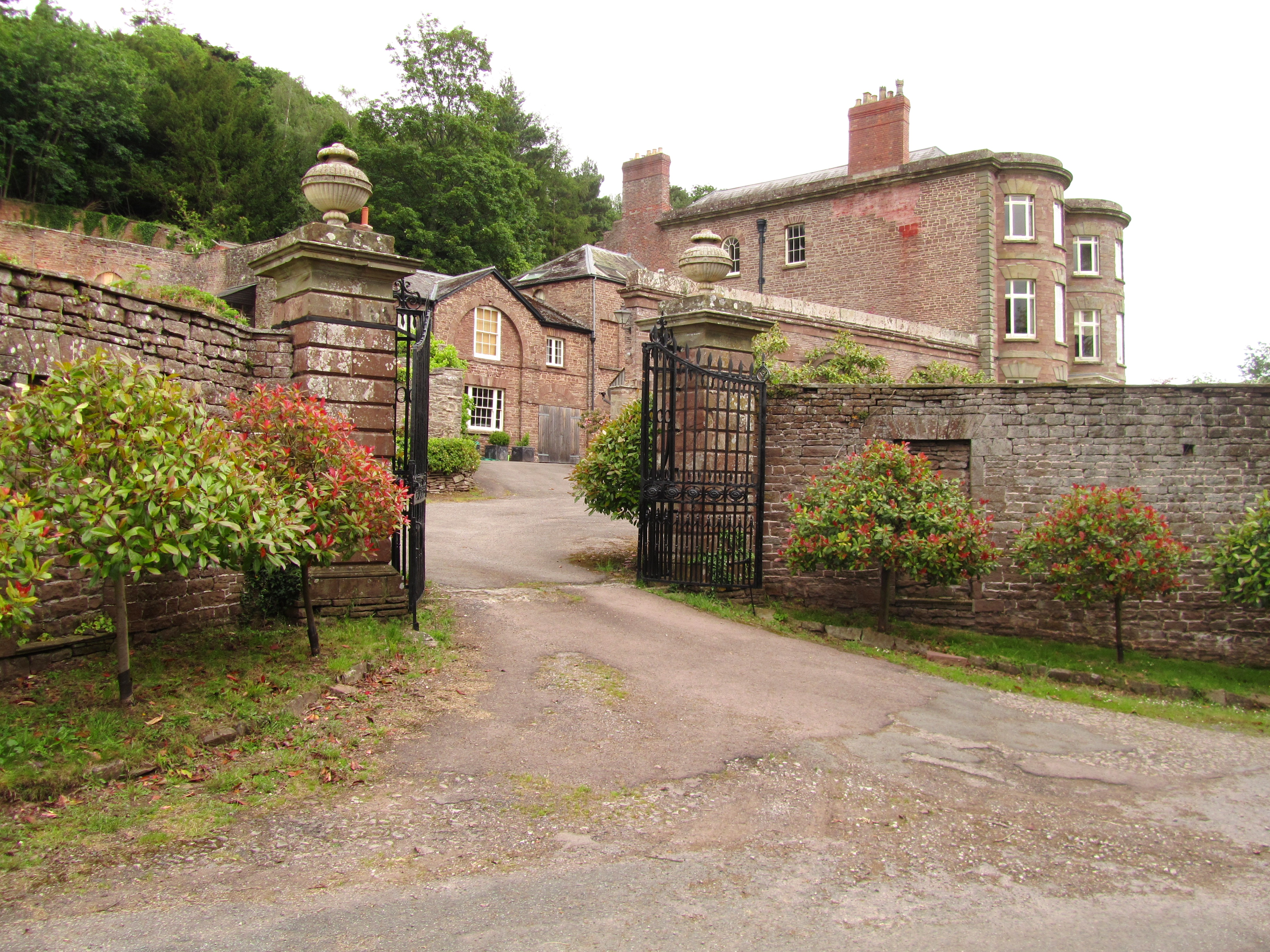
Newton Court

He acquired Goodrich Castle in Herefordshire in 1740 and also bought land at Dixton where he built Newton Court.

He served as Member of Parliament for Arundel from 1754 to 1761.

He died in 1771 and was buried at St Peter's Church in Dixton.

Parliament of Great Britain
Preceded by Garton Orme; Theobald Taafe	Member of Parliament for Arundel; 1754–1761; With: Sir George Colebrooke	Succeeded by Sir George Colebrooke; John Bristow
