= St Peter's Church, Dixton =

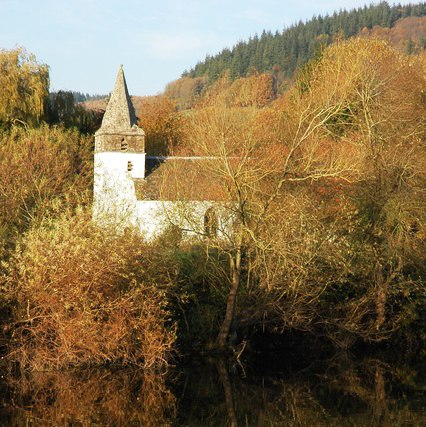
- The church beside the River Wye
- St Peter's Church, Dixton
- 51°49′7.20″N 2°41′59.32″W
- Location: Dixton, Monmouthshire
- Country: Wales
- Denomination: Church of England
- Website: http://www.achurchnearyou.com/dixton-newton-st-peter/

Administration
- Diocese: Hereford

St Peter's Church is a Church of England parish church at Dixton in Wales. It is situated on the banks of the River Wye, about 1 mile (1.6 km) north-east of Monmouth, Wales. The church is a Grade II* listed building and the cross in the churchyard is both a listed building and a scheduled monument.

== History ==
The Book of Llandaff refers to the existence of a church, or monastery, on this site in about 735, when it was already described as an "old church" (henllan; Old Welsh, hên-llan). Later charters refer to its fishing rights on the River Wye. At that time, it was dedicated to the Welsh saint Tydiwg, or Tadeocus. The Welsh name of the parish, Llandydiwg, and ultimately the name Dixton, derives from that of the saint.

The existing church, now substantially rendered and whitewashed, consists of a nave with a separate chancel, a vestry, a tower to the west, and north and south porches. The oldest parts of the building, including the herring-bone masonry in the north wall of the nave, may have an Anglo-Saxon origin or, alternatively, date from the 12th century. The nave seems to have been lengthened during the 13th century, perhaps when the tower and chancel were built. A small window in the southwest corner dates from the early 14th century; even so, in 1397 the church was described as "intolerably dark". The exposed Old Red Sandstone walling in the chancel dates from the 14th century; the chancel has a sanctuary window on each side, a priest's door, and an ancient stone bench outside. A royal coat of arms dated 1711 is painted on a board inside the church.

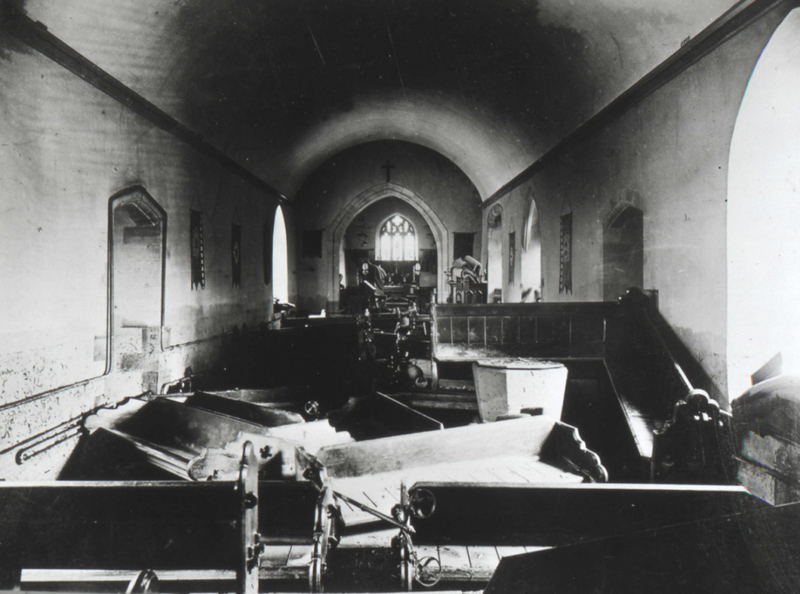
Interior of the church after a flood in 1910

The north porch and vestry were added in 1824, and the whole church was restored in 1861–62. Inside the church are five stained glass windows. The 1862 window on the south of the nave is titled Christ Raising the Daughter of Jairus and Healing the Son of the Widow of Nain. It was designed by John Pollard Seddon, who with John Prichard restored the church. On the same wall is an 1871 window titled The Sermon on the Mount by Ward and Hughes. The last large window is on the east wall of the chancel and is entitled Agnus Dei Adored by St Mary Magdalene and St Tadioc; it dates from 1954.

The church is a Grade II* listed building as of 27 June 1952. In 2005 the cross in the churchyard was also made a listed building. The churchyard cross is also a scheduled monument.

The church is too low-lying to prevent winter floods from entering the building, and brass plates near the chancel arch record the heights of notable floods. A new balcony has been constructed at the back of the church so that perishable items can be kept above the floodline. This balcony is decorated with a beautiful oak screen. The church had a rectory, which was later known as Dixton Cottage.

Burials include Admiral Thomas Griffin (died 1771) and cricketer Trevor Arnott (1902 – 1975).

== Diocese ==
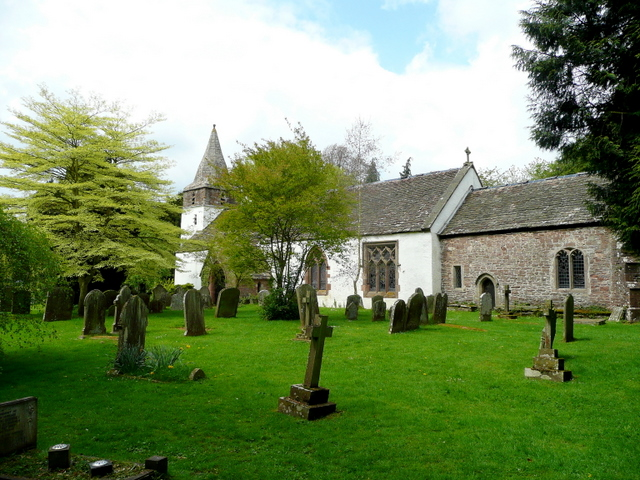

The church remains part of the Diocese of Hereford and the Church of England, despite being in Monmouthshire, Wales. With Monmouth, it was transferred to the Diocese of Llandaff in 1844. However, a vote by the parishioners in 1915 decided that it should not join the Church in Wales when it became disestablished, but stay as part of the Church of England; it therefore returned in 1920 to the Diocese of Hereford. In the following year John Witherston Rickards, who had been the vicar since 1886, died.
