= The Grange, Monmouth =

Buildings in Monmouth, Wales

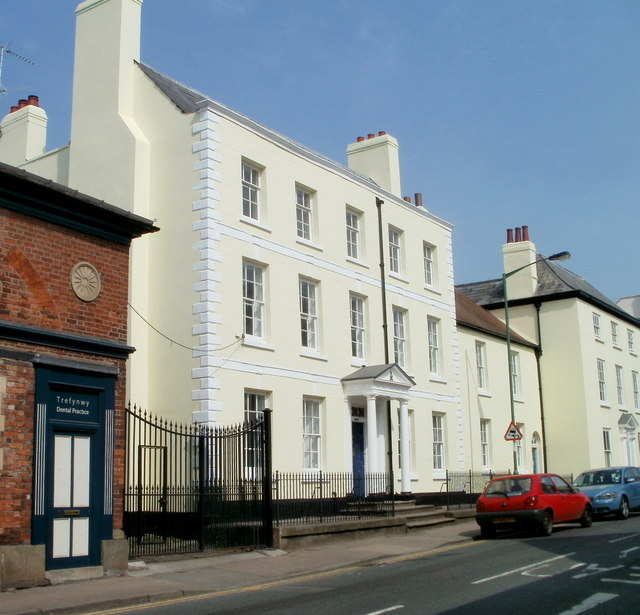
- The Grange at 12–16 St James Street
- Interactive map of the The Grange, Monmouth area

General information
- Location: 12–16 St James Street, Monmouth, Wales
- Coordinates: 51.8124°N 2.7115°W

Design and construction
- Designations: Grade II Listed

The Grange consists of three attached, grade II listed buildings in Monmouth, Wales. It is in the St James Street neighbourhood, within the medieval town walls. The Grange was originally built by Captain Charles Philipps at the site of a former farm house. The buildings later served as a preparatory school, one of the schools of the Haberdashers' Company, until 2009. In 2011, the buildings were converted into a boarding house for students of Monmouth School, another Haberdashers' Company school.

== History and design ==
During the eighteenth century, much of the north side of St James Street in Monmouth was a farm. The Grange is located at the site of the former farm house, and was constructed by Captain Charles Philipps. The Grange at 12–16 St James Street now consists of three connected buildings on the northwest side of the street, as well as an extension at the back of the property. Located within the medieval town walls built around 1300, all three houses are Grade II listed. The three-storey, five-bay main house is currently recorded at 12 St James Street and has railings in front of the street elevation. The listed building has a slate roof and an eighteenth or early nineteenth-century facade with band courses and quoins. The entrance features a pedimented porch with Doric columns and a transom (fanlight). The entablature of the pedimented porch has a frieze with a metope in the style of the Brothers Adam. The pediment has a firemark, a plaque noting that the building owner had given financially to the town fire department. The red brick building next to The Grange at 10 St James Street was once its stable.

== The Grange preparatory school ==
The Grange, the buildings on St James Street, should be distinguished from The Grange, the preparatory school of the Haberdashers' Company, also known as the Worshipful Company of Haberdashers. While the buildings on St James Street housed the prep school for boys ages seven to eleven for decades, in February 2009 the school moved across the River Wye into new quarters on Hadnock Road, east of the town centre. The site chosen for the new preparatory school is in close proximity to Monmouth School's Sports Complex. The new building was designed by the architectural team of Buttress Fuller Alsop Williams. In addition to classroom space, the new Grange includes a garden, kitchen, ICT suite, science laboratory, and art and music facilities. Pupils at The Grange use the Monmouth School's chapel and sports facilities. While students and staff had already started using the new school building on Hadnock Road in February 2009, it wasn't officially dedicated until 23 September 2009. On that day, the new building was formally opened as The Grange, Monmouth Preparatory School, retaining the name of the school's former quarters. HRH Prince Edward, Earl of Wessex, officiated at the September opening ceremonies. Before the recent move to Hadnock Road, children from the St James Street school distinguished themselves in chess, winning Britain's 2003 national title as under-11 chess champions.

== The Grange boarding house ==
On 19 August 2010, Monmouthshire County Council released details of an application to redevelop the former prep school at St James Street as a sixth form boarding facility for older students at Monmouth School. Housing for staff members was planned as well. The application indicated that there were three Grade II listed, connected buildings, as well as an extension that had been added at a later date. The plan was to include a new addition that would be attached to the extant extension at the back of the property. On 13 and 14 December 2010, it was announced that permission for the conversion of The Grange from a prep school to a boarding house had been granted. The alteration of The Grange is a component of the first phase of The Heart Project, a substantial renovation of Monmouth School which has recently been undertaken. The new boarding house opened in September 2011 for students in their last year, with Kingsley Jones as housemaster of the new boarding accommodation.

== See also ==
- St James Street, Monmouth
- Monmouth School
