= Dixton =

Coordinates: 51.8196°N 2.6984°W

Dixton: Welsh: Llandydiwg
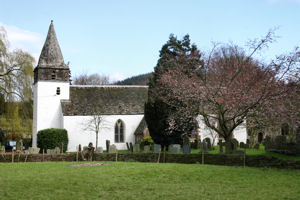
- St Peters Church in Dixton

- Location within Monmouthshire
- OS grid reference: SO519136
- Community: Monmouth
- Principal area: Monmouthshire
- Preserved county: Gwent
- Country: Wales
- Sovereign state: United Kingdom
- Post town: MONMOUTH
- Postcode district: NP25
- Dialling code: 01600
- Police: Gwent
- Fire: South Wales
- Ambulance: Welsh
- UK Parliament: Monmouth
- Senedd Cymru – Welsh Parliament: Monmouth

Dixton (Welsh: Llandydiwg) is a small village located 1 mile (1.6 km) north east of Monmouth, on the banks of the River Wye, in Monmouthshire, south east Wales. The parish originally comprised the two manors of Dixton Newton and Dixton Hadnock, on either side of the river.

== Dixton: Hadnock, Newton and Wyesham ==
According to the antiquarian Sabine Baring-Gould the name Dixton ultimately derives from that of the saint Tydiwg, or Tydiuc, to whom the parish church was dedicated. The Welsh name Llandydiwg became, in English, Dukeston and later Dixton. The parish originally comprised the two manors of Dixton Newton and Dixton Hadnock on either side of the river. In 1868 Dixton was described as being named Dixton Newton but containing the hamlets of Dixton Hadnock and Wyesham. The village name was also offered as Newton-Dixton. By 1901 the name was clearly Dixton but with Dixton Newton still offered as an alternative.

== Church of St Peter ==
The parish church of St Peter is on the site of a Celtic church or monastery dedicated to St Tydiwg, or Tadeocus, which was in existence in the eighth century. The oldest parts of the current building date back at least as far as the 12th century and much of the building dates from the 13th and 14th centuries. It was restored and extended in the 19th century.

The church remains part of the Diocese of Hereford and the Church of England despite being in Monmouthshire, Wales. With Monmouth it was transferred to the Diocese of Llandaff in 1844. However, a vote by the parishioners in 1915 decided that it should not join the Church in Wales when it became disestablished, but stay as part of the Church of England; it returned at that point to the Diocese of Hereford.

== Newton Court and Hall ==
Newton Court is a neo-classical house situated on the hillside above Dixton. It is a Grade II* listed building. The association of the Griffin family began when Admiral Griffin bought land here in the 18th century. Newton Court was built in 1799-1802 for George Griffin, possibly to the designs of architect Anthony Keck (d.1797) of King's Stanley, Gloucestershire. The Court's barn, stables and gardens are also all listed structures. Nearby Newton Hall, also a listed building, probably dates from the 17th century, but was altered in the 19th century. Newton Court is still lived in by the Griffin family as at 2013.

== Dixton Mound ==
Dixton Mound is an oval earthwork of unknown origin about 2m high and 40m diameter at its widest point. It has ditch running around the perimeter. An archaeological dig in 1848 found 11th and 12th century material. Roman material has also been found dating from the 2nd century. Cadw have scheduled the Mound as an ancient monument and it has been classed as a motte.

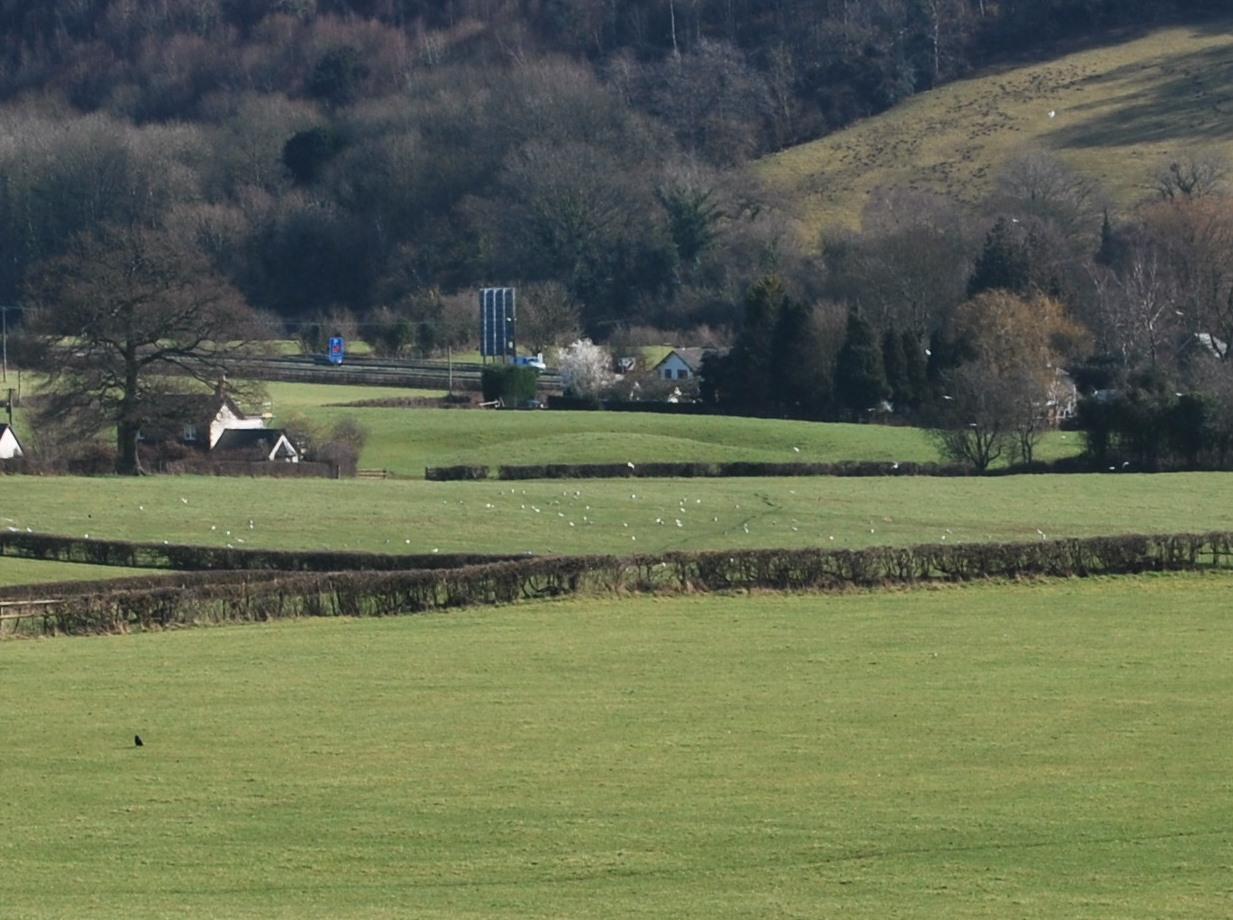
Dixton Mound - seen from the Hereford Road looking towards Dixton

== Railways ==
Dixton was served by trains at Monmouth May Hill across the River Wye. The Ross and Monmouth Railway between Ross-on-Wye and Monmouth Troy between 1873 and 1959 through the scenic Wye Valley.
