= Osbaston, Monmouth =

Coordinates: 51.824430°N 2.718755°W

Osbaston
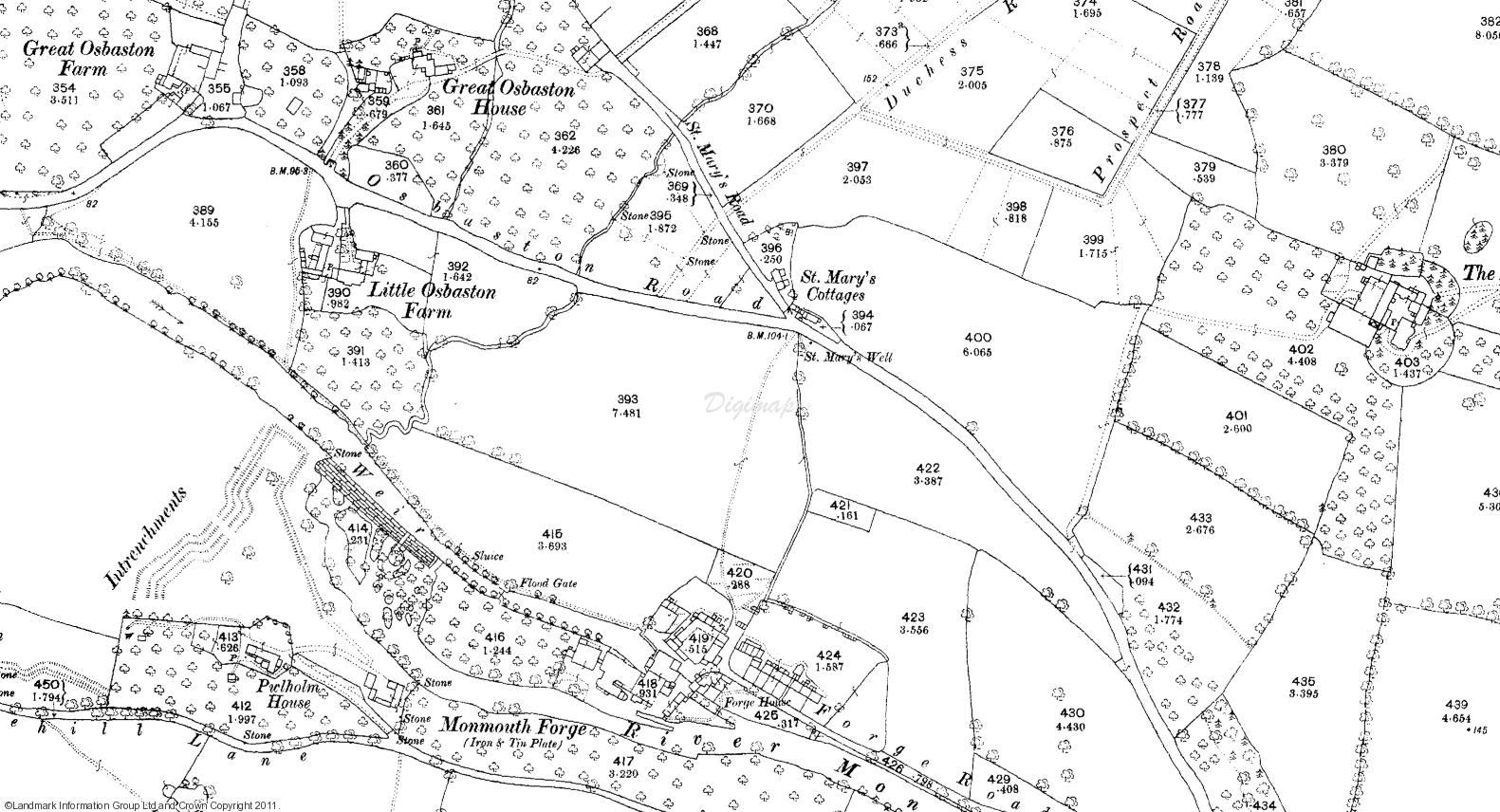
- 1880 Ordnance Survey map of the area, showing the forge, weir and Great Osbaston House

- Location within Monmouthshire
- OS grid reference: SO 50230 14099
- Principal area: Monmouthshire
- Preserved county: Gwent
- Country: Wales
- Sovereign state: United Kingdom
- Post town: MONMOUTH
- Postcode district: NP25
- Dialling code: 01600
- Police: Gwent
- Fire: South Wales
- Ambulance: Welsh
- UK Parliament: Monmouth

Osbaston is a suburb of Monmouth, Wales, located less than 1 mile (1.6 km) north of the town centre. It was the site of one of the first public electricity generating stations in Britain, using water power from the River Monnow.

== Monmouth forge, weir and power station ==
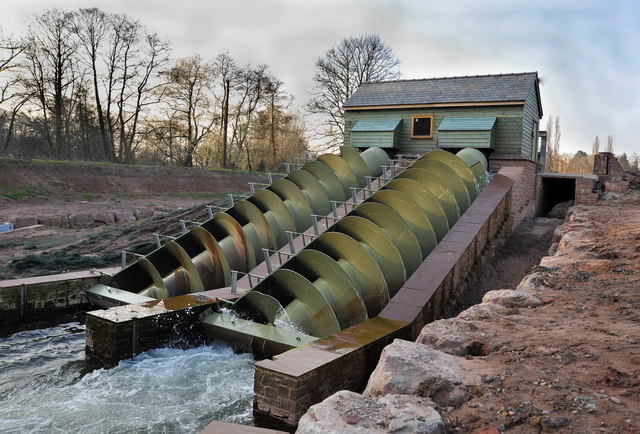
The 2008 hydro power scheme and fish pass

The first records of a water-powered forge for iron working on the River Monnow at Osbaston date from the 12th century, when one was owned by Baderon of Monmouth. A new forge, used for iron production, was built at Osbaston by 1628. Forge workers' cottages nearby date from the late 18th century, and include two small cottages on either side of a pair of two larger houses, for the higher status workmen. The nearby Osbaston Weir, associated with the forge, prevented salmon and other fish reaching their spawning grounds. It has been a Grade II listed building since 8 October 2005.

In 1899, Monmouth Corporation established one of the first publicly owned electricity generating stations in the country at Osbaston. The power station used water power to drive turbines. The height of the weir was raised to impound a reservoir, and the water was directed by a leat to the turbines underneath the brick building, which housed three alternators. In 1930, the power station was bought by part of the General Electric Company, and continued to operate for another twenty years.

In 2008, the Environment Agency created a £600,000 fish pass so that salmon could avoid the weir and spawn upstream. The following year migratory salmon were found 20 miles (32 km) above the fish pass, at Kentchurch. During the engineering work for the fish pass, remains of the old power station were uncovered. Landowner Ronald Kear proposed that the power station be rebuilt and, working in partnership with Environment Agency Wales, invested £500,000 in the project. The electricity scheme uses an Archimedes' screw which powers a generator. It is now operated by the Old Manor Electric Company, and produces 670 MWh of electricity each year for the National Grid, which is sufficient to power over 150 homes. The combined hydroelectric and fish pass project was officially opened by Prince Edward in 2009.

Monnow Mill, a watermill producing flour from the 15th century is situated on the outskirts of Osbaston about half a mile down stream from the power station. The building is now a private residence.

== Notable houses and residents ==
Osbaston House (also known as Great Osbaston House), located 1 km north of Monmouth Castle on the east bank of the River Monnow, has been a Grade II Listed building since 15 August 1974. The house's occupants have included Captain George William Moyse Harmer in 1901, Robert Alan Russel MacClelland in 1967, and Michael John Marshal Clarke (High Sheriff of Gwent) in 1985. Major-General Lennox Alexander Hawkins Napier, C.B., O.B.E., M.C., of Osbaston Farm, was High Sheriff of Gwent in 1988.

To the east of the Old Hereford Road, Priory Farm is a high quality building of the late 17th century, which was said to have borne a date of 1672 on a now-eroded datestone. The house comprises a range of five bays and two storeys under a steeply pitched roof. The end gables are of limestone blocks, with the main east front built of purplish-red brick, enhanced with fine limestone details. Surrounding farm buildings include what is described as "an enigmatic building of Old Red Sandstone rubble, partly of three storeys, partly of two, probably C17."

== Representation ==
Osbaston is part of the Dixton with Osbaston electoral division of Monmouthshire County Council, currently represented by conservative councillor R Rodin.

== Schools and other amenities ==
Osbaston has a primary school, Osbaston Church in Wales School, and a public house, the Royal Oak, on the Hereford Road.

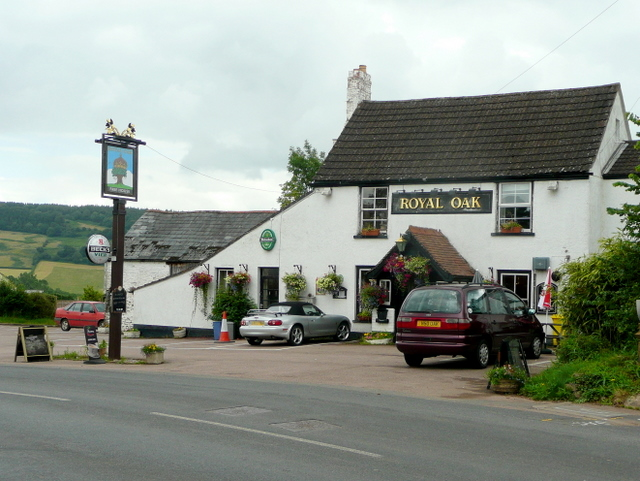
The Royal Oak
