= List of paranormal events reported in Wiltshire, England =

The English county of Wiltshire has a long history of association with paranormal activity, having a number of ghost sightings, UFO sightings, crop circles (with as many as 80% of the UK's crop circles being found in Wiltshire), and stone circles such as Stonehenge, which themselves have been associated with paranormal activity and occultism.

Salisbury Plain has long been used for testing experimental aircraft, and the presence of Porton Down has led to comparisons being made to Area 51, with the suggestion that experimental military craft may have been misidentified as UFOs. Many crop circles in the area have been identified as hoaxes. Wiltshire is noted by the 'paranormal database' as having the highest rate of ghost sightings on its roads of any county in the UK, with founder of the database Darren Mann stating that 15.4% of ghost sightings reported to the database come from Wiltshire. Like much of the UK, Wiltshire has folklore and reported sightings of big cats and ghostly black dogs, with Wiltshire having more black dog myths than any other county in England, some of which are described as malevolent whilst others are described as benevolent.

== Ghost sightings ==
The following is a list of reports of encounters and sightings of ghosts and spirits that have occurred in Wiltshire.

Date	Location	Description	Source
Various	Chapmanslade	Various sightings and stories can be found around the "Dead Maids crossroads", which are supposedly haunted by a black dog and a dead woman.	
Various	Malmesbury Abbey	Malmesbury Abbey is said to be haunted by the ghost of a monk.	
Various	Longleat House	It is said that Longleat House is haunted by the ghost of Alice, the young daughter of the then Marquess of Bath, who died in 1847 at age 11 of tuberculosis	
Various	Avebury/Red Lion Pub	The Red Lion Pub in Avebury is considered one of the most haunted pubs in the UK, with five different ghosts being said to live in the building going back to the 17th century	
October 1888	Aldbourne	While returning from business in Portsmouth, Reverend H C Lambert, Vicar of Baydon, encountered a headless spirit which he believed to be the ghost of a local man named Dore who had committed suicide.	
September 1972	All Cannings	The resident of a cottage in the village saw a woman in green, or grey, appear in the corner of their room.	
2011	Box Tunnel	Workers inspecting the tunnel claim to have seen a wailing woman who disappeared in front of them.	

== UFOs and crop circles ==
The following is a list of reports of encounters and sightings of UFOs and related phenomena. In 2009 the MOD shut down its UFO special desk as it was considered a low priority and many reports could not be verified or had mundane explanations.

Date	Location	Description	Source
25 December 1964 – 1980	Warminster/Cley Hill and surrounding areas	Following reports of an unknown, loud atmospheric phenomenon, a number of UFOs were reportedly seen in Warminster, which began with a sighting by Mrs. Mildred Head in 1964. Peaks in activity were noted in the summers of 1965 and 1966. These phenomena would be variously described under the umbrella term "the Warminster thing". Reports varied from alleged "cigar shaped" objects to those resembling "red hot pokers". Newspaper editor Arthur Shuttlewood, who had previously been sceptical of the sightings, ultimately claimed to have seen as many as 800 UFOs in the Warminster area between 1965 and 1973. Shuttlewood is credited with bringing national attention to Warminster's apparent UFO flap.	
1976	Cley Hill	David Kingston claims to have seen UFOs make a crop circle while on a night walk.	
1996	Stonehenge	A crop circle appeared near Stonehenge that seemed to display a Julia set.	
15 February 1997	Westbury	An object landed near the Westbury White Horse.	
26 February 1997	Near Marlborough	A low-flying, green object with a tail was reported.	
12 April 1997	Warminster	A metallic disc with a diameter of 15–20 metres (49–66 ft) was seen.	
7 May 1997	Calne	A triangular object making a buzzing sound followed the witness.	
21 May 1997	Bradford-on-Avon	Loud, blue flashing lights were seen.	
9 June 1997	Calne	A bright, cylindrical object was reported.	
22 June 1997	Malmesbury	A large orange object was seen flying vertically.	
3 July 1997	Swindon	Green, balloon-shaped objects were reported.	
11 July 1997	Swindon	Lights were seen flying in circles.	
20 July 1997	Marlborough	Low-flying, static orange orbs were reported.	
2 August 1997	Wootton Bassett	A round object was reported. It was described as a very bright white.	
3 August 1997	Swindon	A vertically-moving, cylindrical object was reported.	
12 August 1997	Corsham	Two triangular objects were reported.	
26 August 1997	Trowbridge	A small, circular object with red and green lights was reported.	
4 October 1997	Chippenham	A dark, flat object was reported.	
5 October 1997	Salisbury	A high-flying, triangular object with red and green lights was reported.	
25 December 1997	Froxfield	A large, possibly burning, disc-shaped object was reported.	
5 January 1998	Calne	A large elongated object, described as larger than a C-130 Hercules, was reported.	
14 January 1998	Calne	A white and green cylindrical object was reported.	
2 June 1998	Melksham	Two distant, red objects were seen.	
25 June 1998	Warminster/Westbury	A flying saucer was reported.	
3 July 1998	Bradford-on-Avon	A grey-coloured, oval object was reported.	
9 September 1998	Trowbridge	Bright lights were reported. They were bright enough to be seen through curtains.	
14 September 1998	Salisbury	A yellow, luminous object was sighted, which was car-sized and flying low.	
10 November 1998	Salisbury	A red/green starlike object was reported.	
16 November 1998	Marlborough	A flaming object was spotted. It was further described as white and moving vertically.	
17 November 1998	Chippenham	Colourful, shooting star-like objects were reported.	
8 June 1999	Marlborough	A private pilot reported a colourful, circular object making rapid movements.	
11 June 1999	Salisbury	A rotating, reflective object was reported.	
12 July 1999	Wiltshire	Three orange objects were seen in a line.	
19 September 1999	Marlborough	A fast-moving, car-sized, tubular object was reported.	
9 October 1999	Calne	Two lights were seen moving rapidly.	
10 October 1999	Foxham	A singular, bright light was reported.	
17 December 1999	Swindon	Two bright white objects were seen making circles.	
28 December 1999	Swindon	A fast-moving, circular object was reported.	
5 January 2000	Wootton Bassett	A singular object that changed colour from white to green-orange was reported.	
3 February 2000	Melksham	Four large, orange objects were reported to be flying in formation.	
27 July 2000	Salisbury	A triangular formation of objects was reported.	
2 December 2000	Stonehenge/Salisbury	A bright, green and blue flashing sphere was reported.	
14 February 2001	Salisbury	A triangular, red and purple object was reported.	
3 April 2001	Chippenham	A pair of bright red lights were reported.	
June 2001	West Wiltshire, Trowbridge	Multiple witnesses described a bright, slow-moving light flying overhead.	
15 September 2001	Swindon	A bright white object was seen. It was reported to be moving vertically.	
28 July 2002	Near Salisbury	A bright red light was reported.	
26 June 2003	Melksham	A silvery white object was reported.	
16 August 2003	Amesbury	A flying saucer was reported.	
24 September 2004	Devizes	A fiery ball coming down from the sky was reported.	
24 September 2004	Swindon	A silent orange disc was reported.	
2005	Lockeridge	A man claims to have seen three metallic craft flying over a field.	
10 February 2006	Marlborough	A hovering light shifted colours between red, orange, green, and blue.	
2007	Boscombe down	A very bright, stationary light was reported.	
3 February 2007	M4/Swindon	An object with a green halo fell from the sky.	
28 June 2007	Swindon	A UFO was seen for a short time.	
5 September 2007	Wroughton	An object was seen that was said to resemble an object during reentry.	
5 September 2007	Wootton Bassett	An arc-shaped object with 10-12 white lights was reported.	
6 October 2007	Trowbridge	A bright white light followed by 20 flickering orange lights were reported.	
2008	Wroughton	A crop circle appeared which seemed to show the first 10 digits of pi.	
9 February 2008	Ashton Keynes	Slow moving orange lights, numbering 20, were seen.	
4 July 2008	Wroughton	A white, triangular object was reported.	
20 September 2008	Calne	Five bright orange/pink objects were sighted. They were reported to be silent.	
10 December 2008	Devizes	A small, fast-moving, golden-coloured orb was reported.	
2009	Silbury hill	An off-duty police sergeant reported seeing 6 ft (1.8 m) tall blonde figures in all white making a crop circle. An electric crackling sound was reported before the figures disappeared.	
1 January 2009	Chippenham	A UFO sighting was reported.	
13 February 2009	Bradford-on-Avon	An orange orb was seen flying in a deliberate manner.	
22 February 2009	Swindon	Bright lights, numbering 80, where seen flying.	
26 February 2009	Malmsbury	Two objects where seen shining light horizontally above the clouds.	
4 March 2009	Swindon	Various star-shaped lights where seen.	
4 April 2009	Swindon	A large orange object was seen flying over RAF Lyneham.	
5 April 2009	Swindon	A peculiar object was seen.	
12 April 2009	Swindon	Four glowing objects where seen changing direction and brightness.	
14 June 2009	Wroughton	A black, disclike object was seen flying over crop circles near Barbury Castle.	
27 June 2009	Swindon	About 12-13 orange lights were reported flying in a line.	
24 August 2009	Swindon	Three lights forming an isosceles triangle, which made no sound, were seen flying.	
29 August 2009	Lyneham	Orange lights were seen following each other.	
1 October 2009	Chippenham	Lights were seen in the sky.	
31 October 2009	Westbury	A bright circular light was seen.	
11 September 2016	Swindon	A resident saw and reported to the police a UFO in the sky and an alien in their living room.	
20 September 2016	Salisbury	A resident woman claimed to have been abducted by aliens.	
May 2017	Cley Hill	A local resident spotted and filmed a UFO flying over the hill.	
19 August 2017	Cley Hill	Frome resident Jeremy Le Fevre spotted a green and red object flying over the hill.	
13 August 2018	Cley Hill	Objects where spotted flying in a line over the hill.	
5 April 2019	Chippenham	A resident man claimed to have been abducted by aliens.	
10 October 2019	Trowbridge	A resident reported a UFO sighting.	
17 January 2021	Chippenham	A resident informed police than an ex-friend had knowledge about aliens.	
