= Church Street, Monmouth =

Street in Monmouth, Wales

Church Street
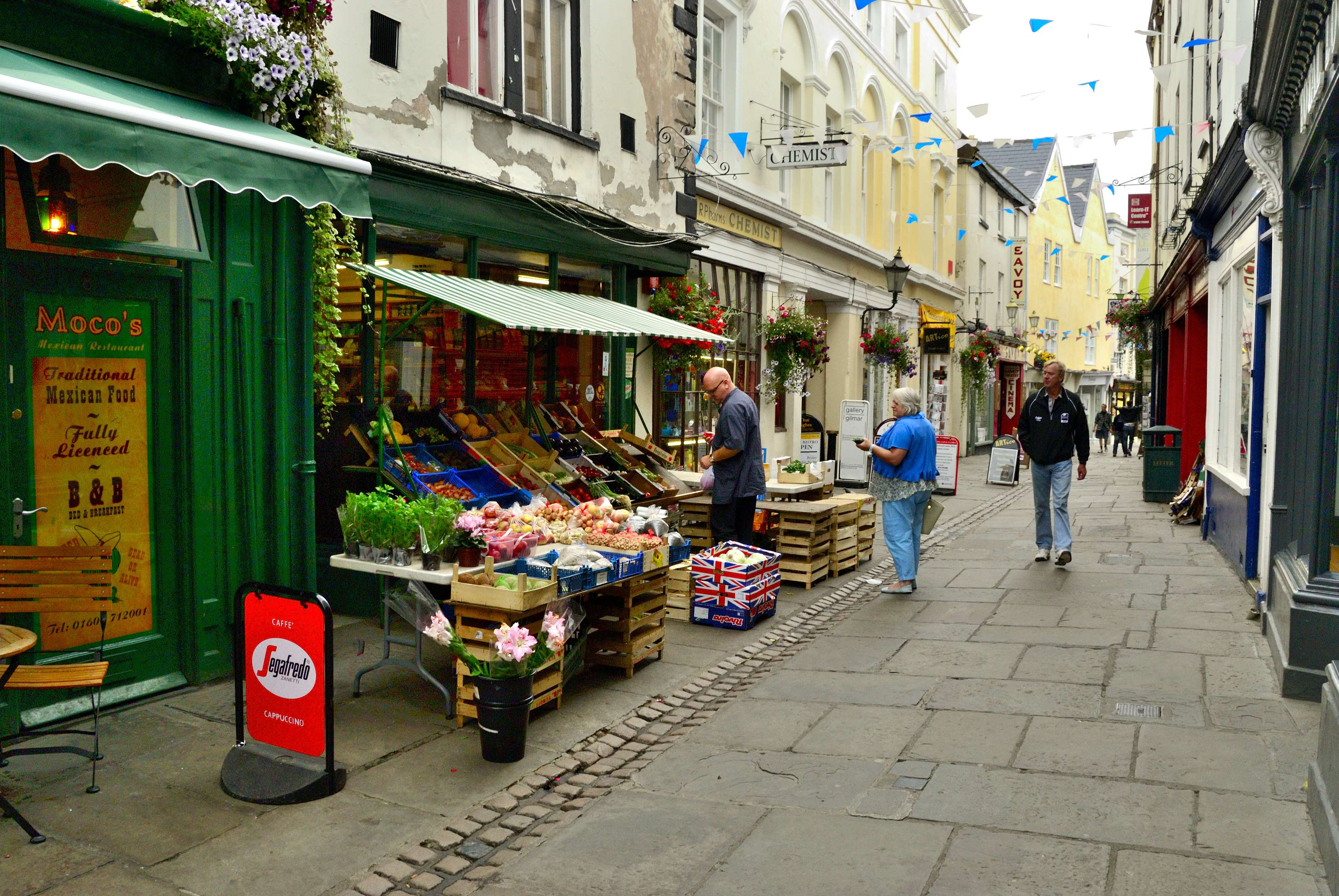
- Church Street, Monmouth
- Former name(s): Stepney Street; Church Lane; Butcher's Row
- Location: Monmouth, Wales
- Coordinates: 51.8127°N 2.7148°W
- East: Agincourt Square
- West: Monk Street

Church Street is a pedestrianised street in the centre of Monmouth, Wales. It contains a variety of independent shops, restaurants, commercial art galleries, and the Savoy Theatre. Until the 1830s, when Priory Street was built to bypass it, it was the main thoroughfare into the centre of Monmouth from the north-east, linking the market and the parish church. It was at one time the centre of the town's butchery trade and was known as Butcher's Row.

== History ==
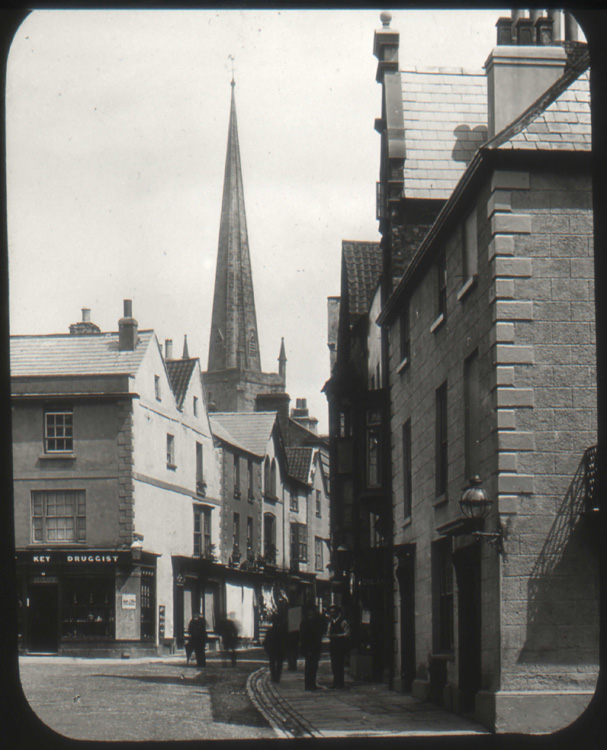
Church St. 1890-1900 from west in Agincourt square

According to local writer and antiquarian Charles Heath in 1804:

Church Street was originally a mere thoroughfare, scarcely wide enough to admit a loaded waggon to pass through it. Every door had its pent-house, with a seat under it, which afforded the opportunity to inquisitive minds of watching their neighbour's business, instead of attending to their own. When Sir John Stepney, Baronet, was elected M.P. for the borough, it was altered and improved at his expense; in compliment to whom it was as frequently called Stepney Street as Church Lane; but when I came to Monmouth, considering the principal entrance from London into the town, as worthy of a more modern title, I printed it Church Street, which is the name it continues to be known by...... In Speed's map (printed in 1610), this street is called "Butcher's Row", probably from being occupied by men in that employ, or where the animals were slaughtered. On the site of the most respectable part of it was a dirty shore or kennel, and, on the bank above, posts and rails were placed, to secure the passengers from falling into it. Great additions to its appearance have been made within these few years, by almost every tradesman residing in it.

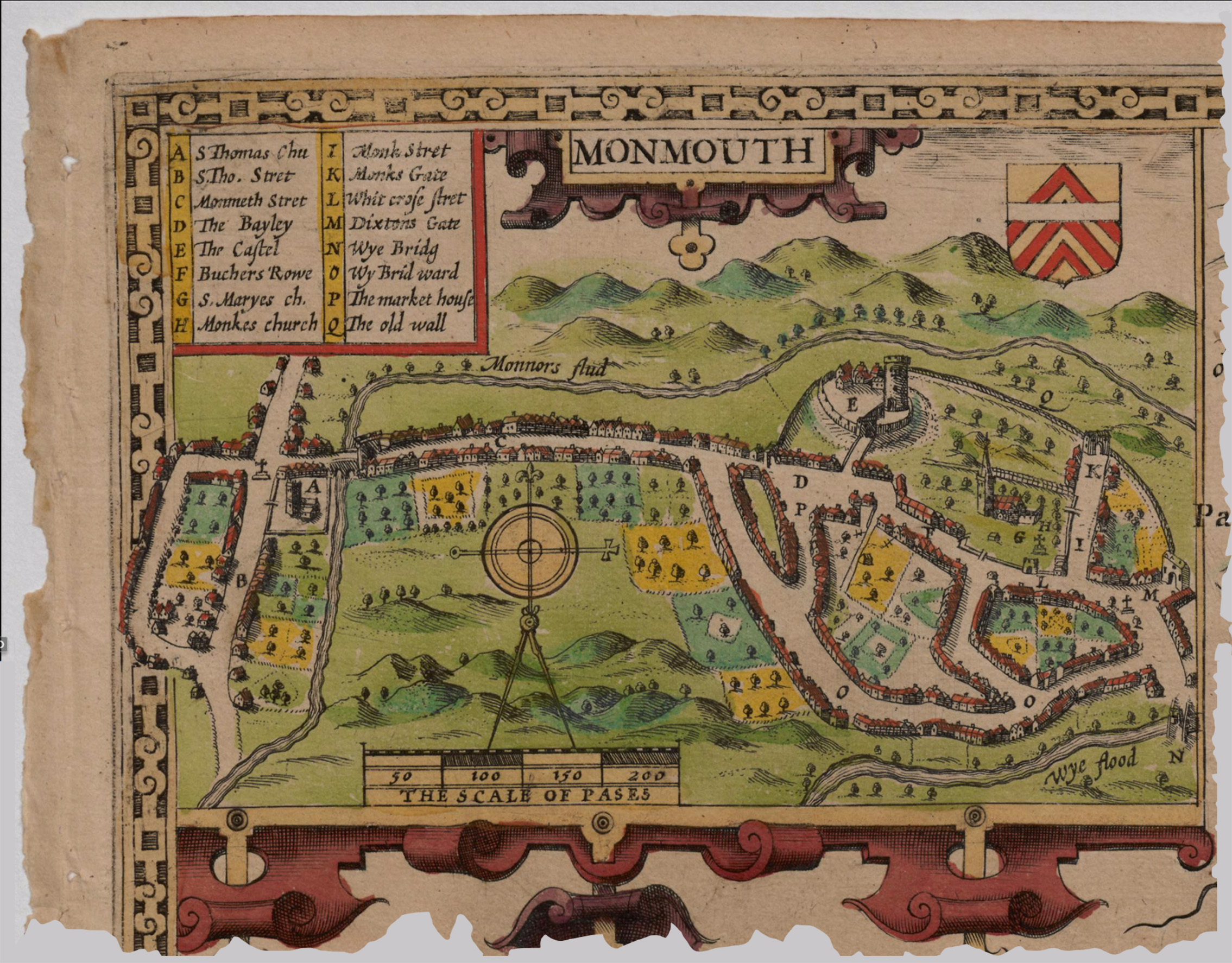
John Speed's town map of 1610, showing "Buchers Row" (marked F)

The word "penthouse" referred, at that time, to a structure with a sloping roof attached to the outside wall of a building; and "kennel" referred to a gutter at the edge of the street. Sir John Stepney was M.P. for Monmouth between 1767 and 1783.

By the 1830s, Church Street had become increasingly congested and insalubrious, "narrow and dangerous". According to local tradition, a local gingerbread maker, Mrs Syner, was closing the shutters of her shop one evening when the mail coach to Liverpool went through at a gallop. Her apron strings were caught in one of the horses' harnesses, and she was dragged along the ground for some distance. Escaping serious injury, she grabbed the coachman's whip, knocked out some of his teeth with the handle, and marched back to her shop to begin organising a petition for a new road to be built to bypass Church Street. The Borough Council then organised a competition for the best scheme, with a prize of £10 for the winner. The prize was won by local architect George Vaughan Maddox, who proposed a new carriage road — now Priory Street — on a viaduct immediately above the bank of the River Monnow. Work began on the new road in 1834, and it was opened in 1837.

== Features ==
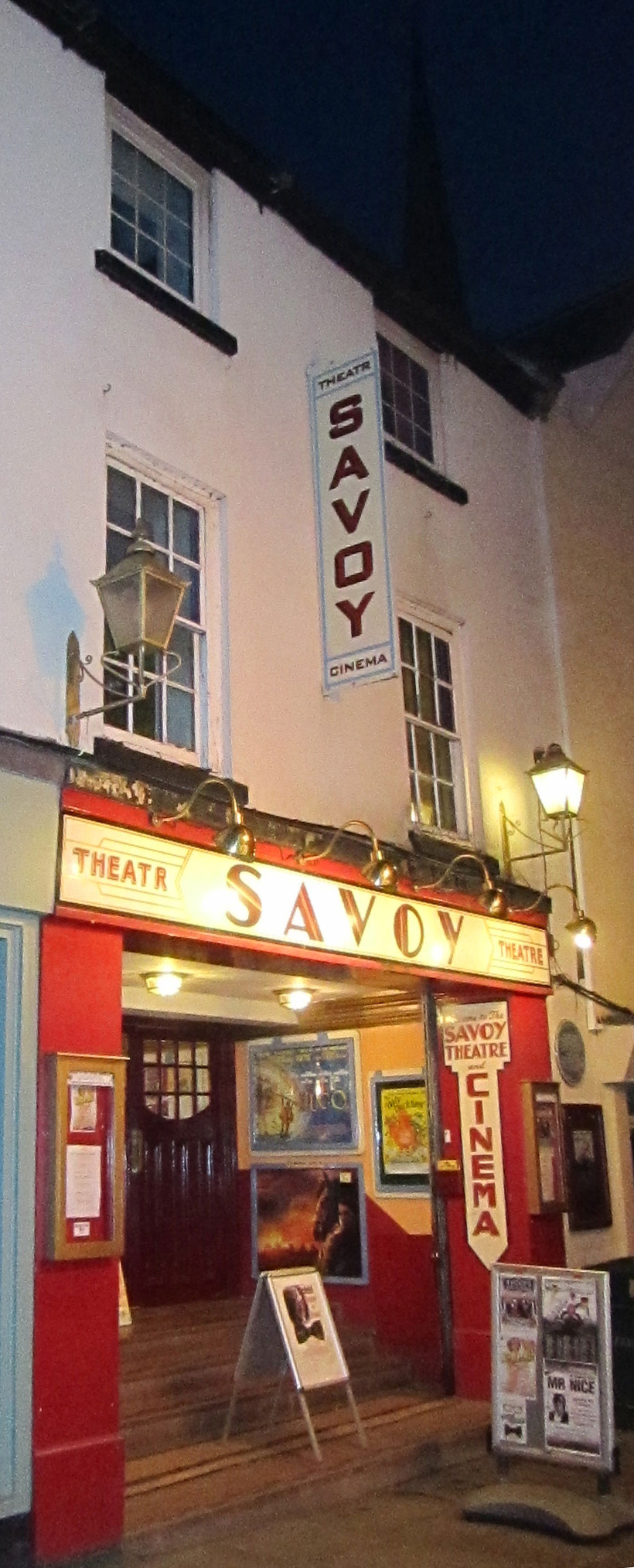
The Savoy Theatre at night

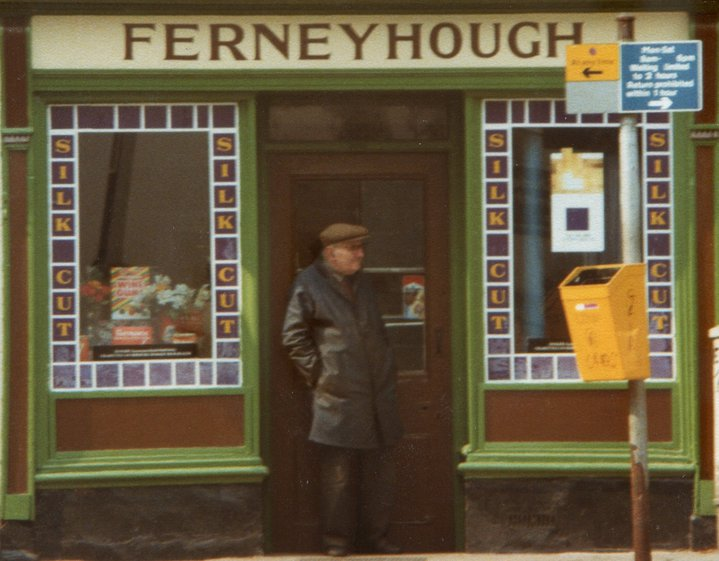
The shop owner, R. A. Ferneyhough, outside his traditional sweet shop at 24 Church Street in the 1980s

The buildings in the modern street date largely from the early nineteenth century, with continuous three-storeyed, stuccoed terraces on both sides. The frontage of 24 Church Street was designed by G. V. Maddox around 1840. 12-16 Church Street on the left, providing an entrance to White Swan Court, built at the same time as Priory Street, may also be by Maddox.

The Savoy Theatre is a Grade II* listed building, which was refurbished in 1928 in traditional style, and is reputedly the oldest working theatre site in Wales. The building in which the theatre is housed was constructed on the foundations of the earlier Bell Inn, and was first granted an entertainment licence in 1832. It became Monmouth's first cinema, the "Living Picture Palace and Rinkeries", in 1910, before being rebuilt by the Albany Ward theatre group. It closed as a cinema in the 1980s, later reopening as a bingo hall and again closing in 1983, before reopening for a time to show historic magic lantern slides. It has operated continuously as a cinema since the 1990s and is now run by a charitable trust.

Other premises in the street are now occupied by art galleries, gift shops, a bookshop, traditional greengrocers, butchers, chemist, clothes shops, coffee shops, and restaurants.
