= Albany ward =

Albany Ward may refer to:

- Albany Ward – Hannam Edward Albany Ward (1879–1966), pioneer English theatre proprietor and cinema developer
- Albany Ward (local government) – a ward of Auckland Council, New Zealand
