= Savoy Theatre, Monmouth =

Theatre and cinema in Monmouth, Wales

Savoy Theatre
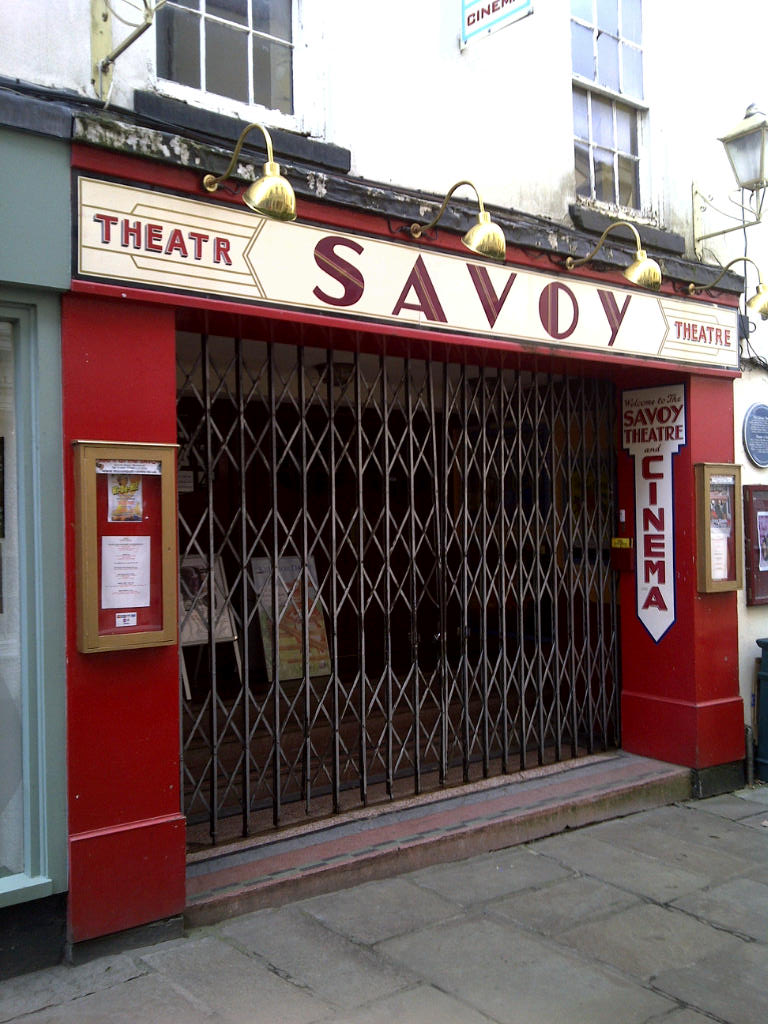
- Entrance to the Savoy Theatre
- Interactive map of Savoy Theatre
- Address: Church Street; Monmouth; Wales
- Coordinates: 51.81284°N 2.71450°W
- Owner: MacTaggart family
- Capacity: 360

Construction
- Opened: 5 March 1928

Website
- www.monmouth-savoy.co.uk

The Savoy Theatre, Church Street, Monmouth is a theatre and cinema, reputedly the oldest working theatre site in Wales. It has a capacity for 360 people and is run by a charitable trust. One of 24 buildings on the Monmouth Heritage Trail, the theatre is a Grade II* listed building.

== History ==
The building in which the theatre is housed was constructed on the foundations of the earlier Bell Inn, in Monmouth's historic town centre. Originally known as the Assembly Rooms, the theatre was first granted an entertainment licence in 1832. It was refurbished as the Theatre Royal in 1850 under J. F. Rogers, and later became the town's Corn Exchange. It was briefly a roller skating rink, belonging to the White Swan Hotel, at the end of the 19th century, before reopening in 1910 as Monmouth's first cinema, the "Living Picture Palace and Rinkeries". In 1912, it was renamed the Palace, in later years the Scala and then the Regent.

In 1927 the building was bought by the Albany Ward theatre group, gutted and reopened on 5 March 1928 as "The New Picture House". This showed the first "talking pictures" in the town in 1930. It closed as a cinema in the 1960s, later reopening as a bingo hall and again closing in 1983, before reopening for a time to show historic magic lantern slides. It has operated continuously as a cinema since the 1990s. In 1989 Cadw designated the theatre a Grade II* listed building, the listing record describing it as “a rare and little altered example of a small cinema from the inter-War period in Wales”.

== Current management and operation ==
The Savoy is the oldest working theatre site in Wales and is privately owned by the MacTaggart family, descendants of B. T. Davies who once owned 19 cinemas in South Wales and South West England. It is leased to a charitable trust, the Monmouth Savoy Trust, comprising voluntary enthusiasts who operate the venue for the benefit of the local community. The Trust were instrumental in preventing the theatre from closing in 2010. The venue has no public funding, and costs about £50,000 per year to run.

In 2004, the Heritage Lottery Fund contributed towards the restoration of the interior decoration, which includes red velvet curtains, elaborate gilded plasterwork, and glass chandeliers. The theatre has reputedly excellent acoustics. It now shows a regular nightly programme of cinema films, interspersed with concerts, drama and comedy shows, and also organises community initiatives and competitions. In January 2012, it won a grant from the NatWest Bank's Community Force initiative, to help the Trust realise its ambitions of running an after-school film club for children and expanding its work with youth drama workshops. The Savoy still shows up-to-date films, but it also hosts a wide range of theatrical and musical events. The theatre, and adjoining properties, were advertised for sale in 2022.

== Gallery ==
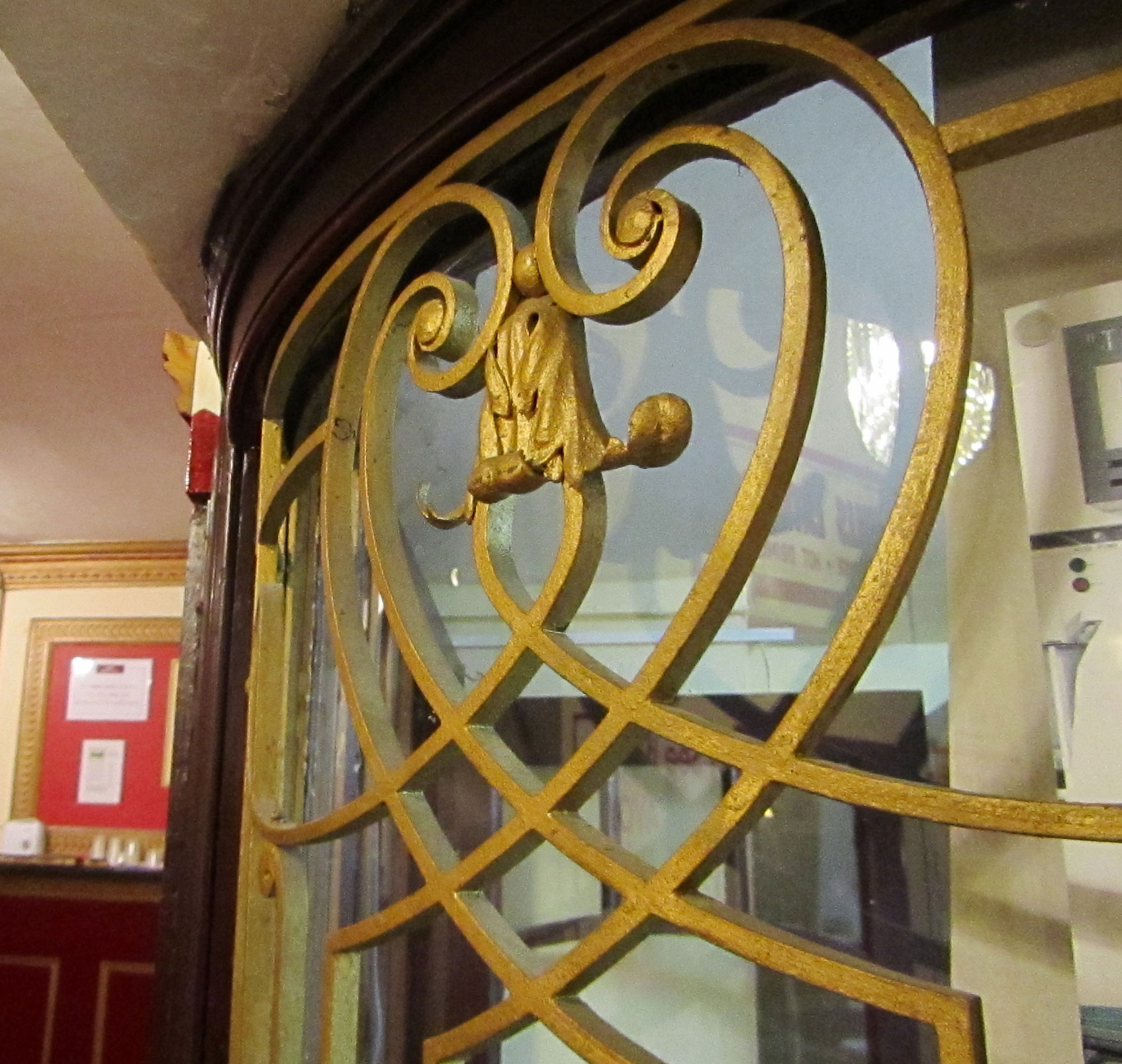
Ironwork on the ticket booth

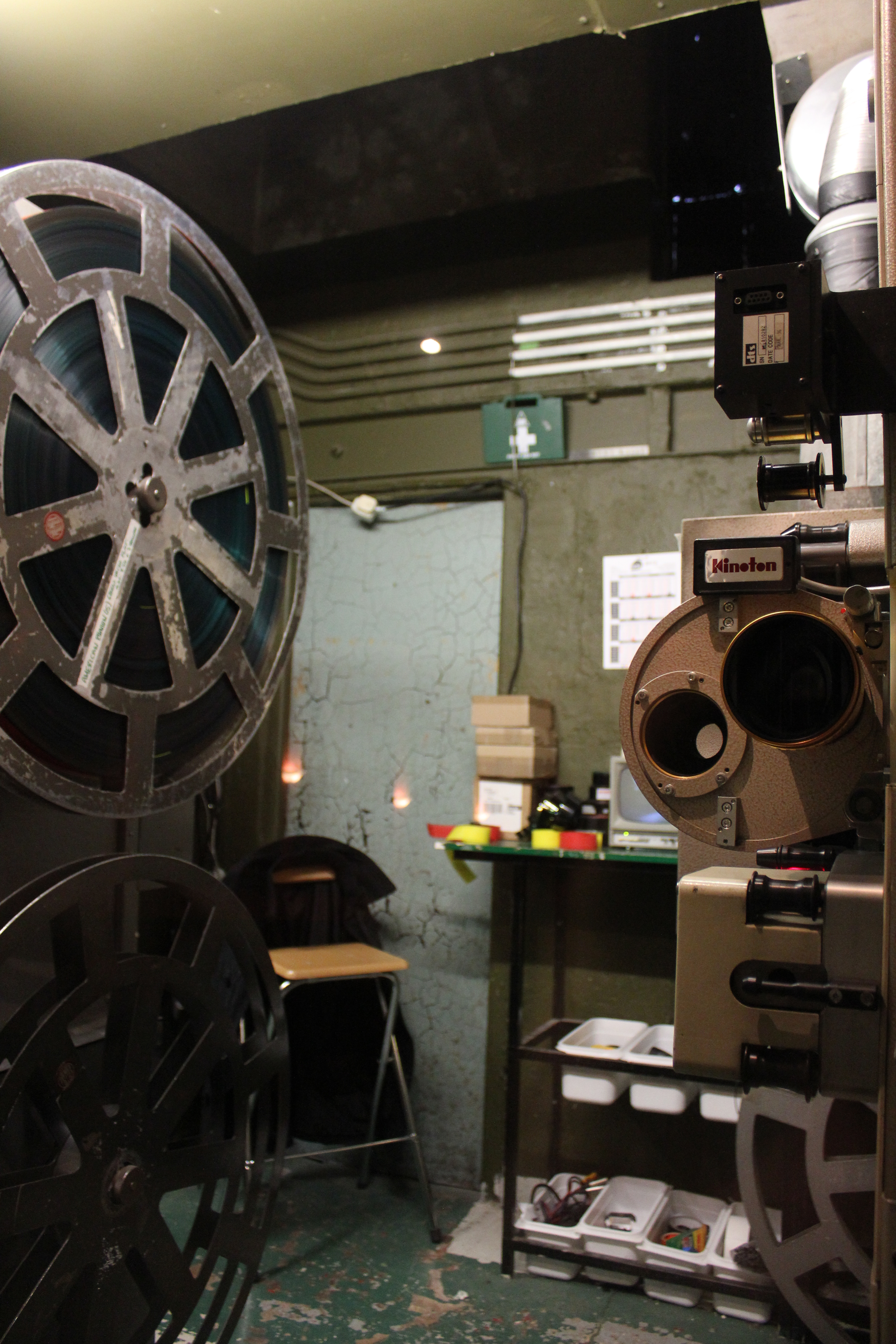
The projection room

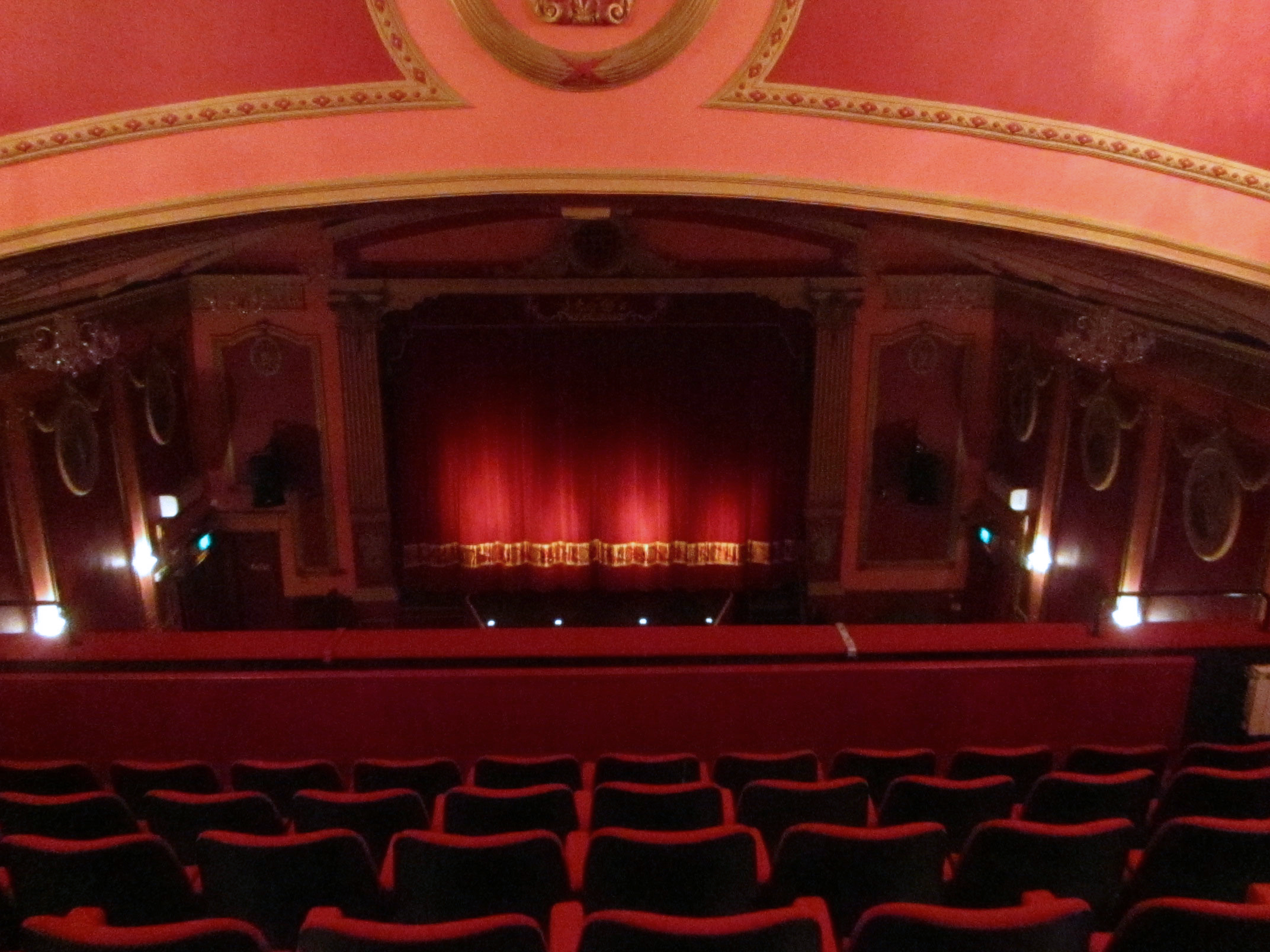
View from central balcony

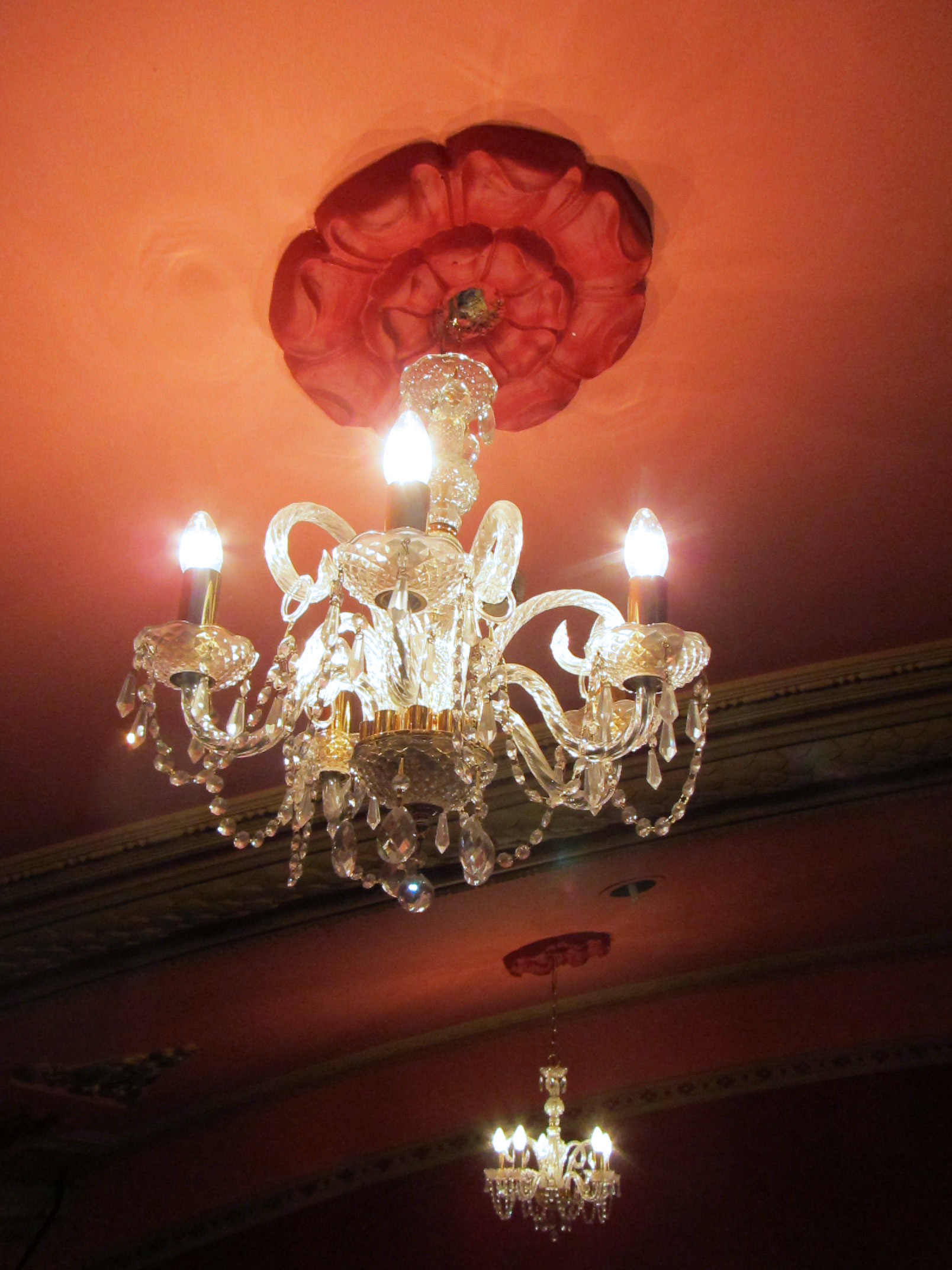
Chandelier on balcony

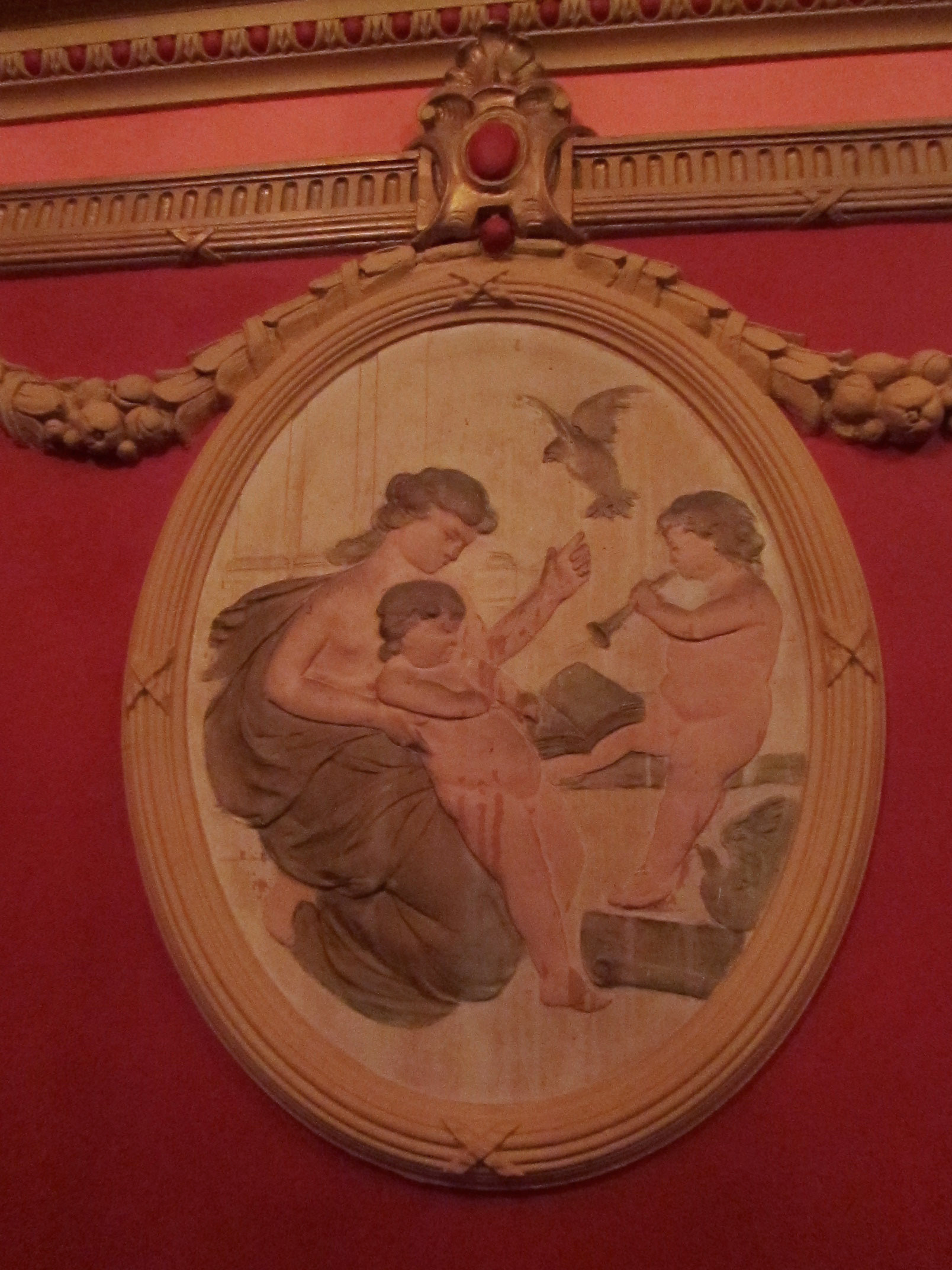
Plaster, mythical nude and trumpeting cherubs

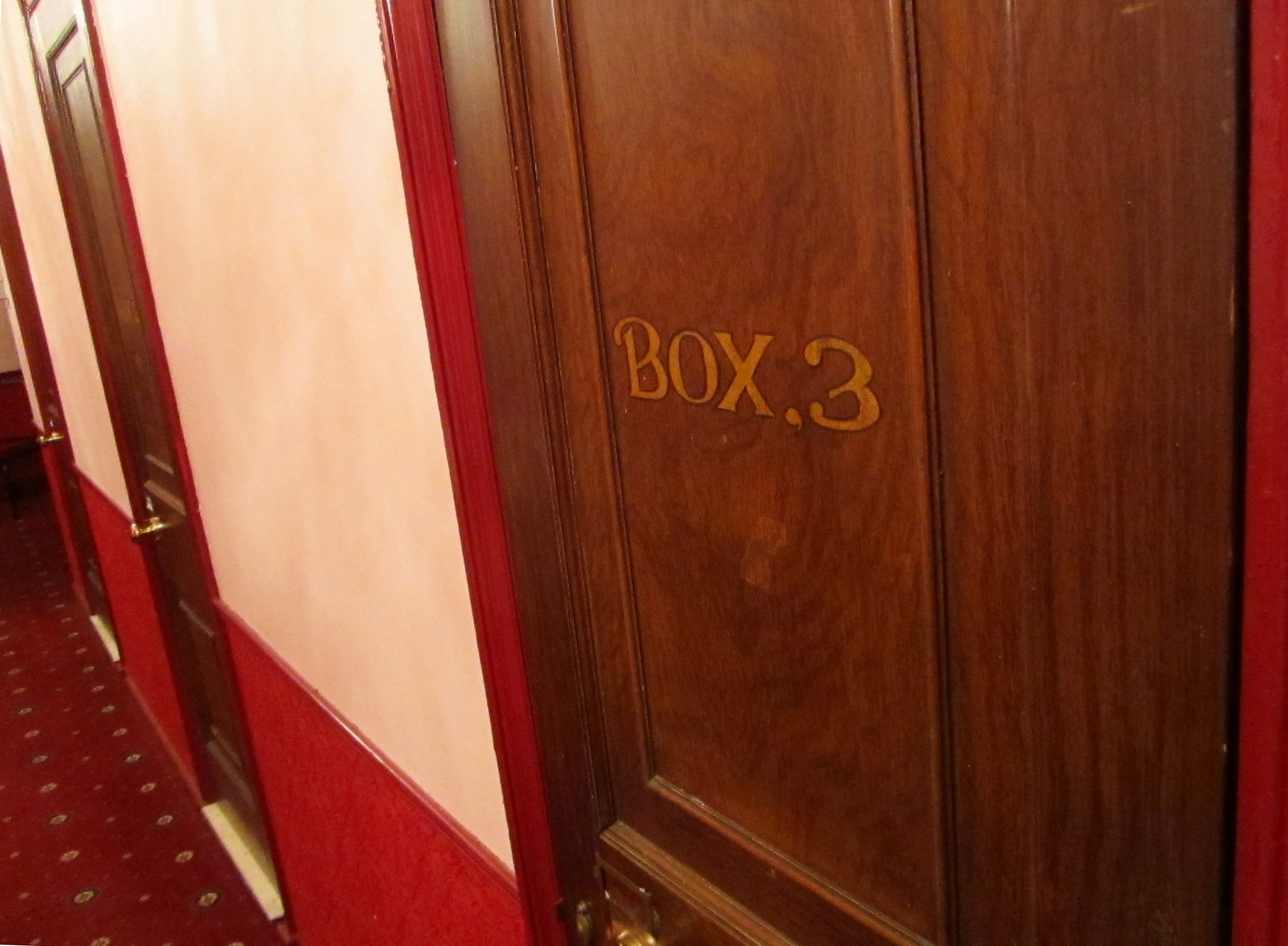
Balcony box 3 door, detail
