= Arthur Shuttlewood =

British journalistand ufologist (1920–1996)

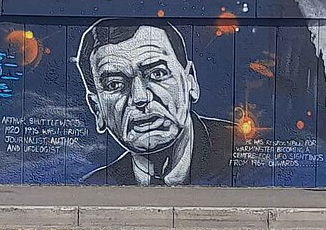
Portrait of Arthur Shuttlewood from the 60th anniversary of the 'Warminster thing' mural in Warminster made by Paul Boswell

Arthur Shuttlewood (1920–1996) was a British journalist, author and ufologist.

Shuttlewood was born in 1920 in Chelmsford, Essex. Shuttlewood moved to Warminster in 1940, and served in the Grenadier Guards and the Air Ministry Constabulary.

He was significantly responsible for popularizing the hypothesis of UFOs as a proposed explanation for the "Warminster thing".

He had five children.

Shuttlewood died in Warminster in 1996.

== Role in Warminster thing sightings ==
In 1964, the residents of Warminster, Wiltshire, England began reporting anomalous atmospheric sounds. Originally a skeptic, Shuttlewood would become convinced that the events were related to the alleged phenomenon of UFOs upon gathering statements from witnesses and purportedly seeing a UFO himself from his window in 1965. A local factory worker named Gordon Faulkner would take a photo of what he believed was a UFO. He gave it to Shuttlewood to "do as he seemed [sic] fit". Shuttlewood would hand the photo over to the Daily Mirror, who would give the sightings national attention, solidifying the name "Warminster thing". In 1966, BBC West would produce a documentary titled "Pie in the Sky", bringing further attention to the sightings, after which Shuttlewood began writing books about UFOs and his experience with them. The authenticity of some of his work has been called into question as the sightings listed in his book The Warminster Mystery were reportedly more sensationalistic than those earlier published in The Warminster Journal.. At least one incorrectly dated sighting and one possible misattribution have also been noted following analysis. Around the same time, Shuttlewood began organizing sky-watching events in an attempt to see UFOs. In 1976, a bi-monthly magazine called The Fountain Journal began focusing on local sightings. Run by the Fountain Centre, it would launch under Shuttlewood's patronage; however, fights with Shuttlewood and Margaret Tedder-Shepherd, co-owner of the Fountain Centre, would lead the magazine's editors Peter and Jane Paget to shift to a more new age style after the first three issues. The periodical began focusing less on UFOs and started experimenting with sci-fi stories, in an attempt to find alternate sources of revenue. News of the World planned to write a piece about The Fountain Journal in 1977; however, financial difficulties led the magazine to shut down before the article could be published. Eleven editions of The Fountain Journal had been released.

== Publications ==
- The Warminster Mystery 1967, Neville Spearman
- Warnings from Flying Friends 1968
- UFOs: Key to the New Age 1971
- The Flying Saucerers 1976, Sphere
- UFO Magic in Motion
- More UFOs over Warminster 1979, Arthur Barker
- UFO's: Visions of a New Age 1981, Inner Light
