= Warminster Town Hall =

Municipal building in Warminster, Wiltshire, England

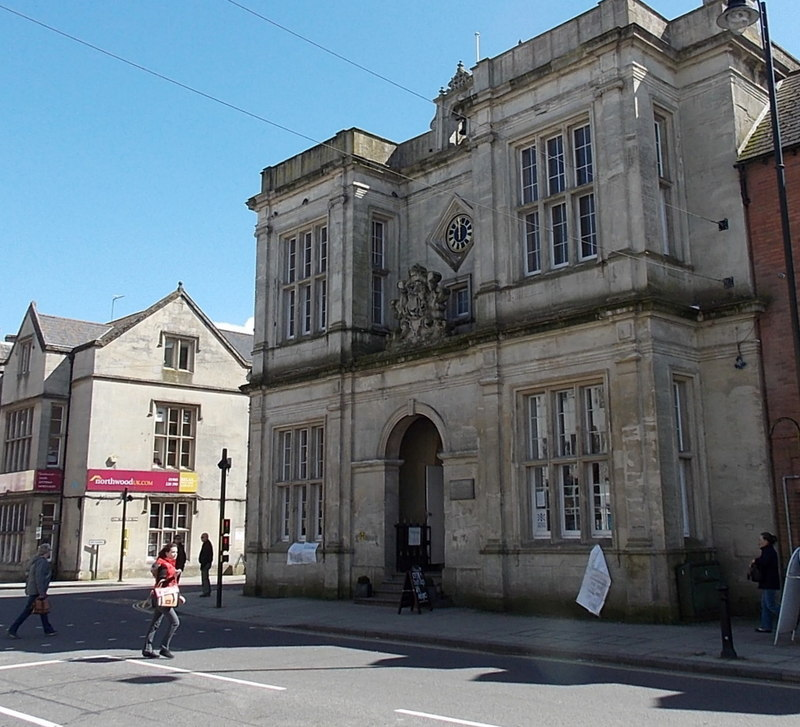
- Warminster Town Hall

- Shown in Wiltshire
- 51.2048°N 2.1815°W
- Location: Market Place, Warminster, Wiltshire, England

History
- Built: 1837

Site notes
- Architect: Edward Blore
- Architectural style: Tudor style

Listed Building – Grade II
- Official name: Town Hall
- Designated: 31 March 1978
- Reference no.: 1364438

Warminster Town Hall is a former municipal building in the Market Place of Warminster, Wiltshire, England. The structure, which served as the headquarters of Warminster Urban District Council, is a Grade II listed building.

== History ==
The first town hall in Warminster, which was erected on the north side of the High Street on the corner with the Close, was completed in 1711 but, after it became an obstruction to traffic, it was demolished in 1830.

The current building was built on behalf of the 2nd Marquess of Bath and modelled on his ancestral home, Longleat. It was designed by Edward Blore in the Tudor style, built in ashlar stone and was completed in 1837. The design involved a symmetrical main frontage with three bays facing onto the Market Place, near its junction with the High Street; the central bay, which was deeply recessed, featured a porch with a round headed entrance and cast iron gates surmounted by the marquess's coat of arms. There was a quadrilateral-shaped panel containing a clock on the first floor and a parapet and central bellcote at roof level. The outer bays contained three-light mullioned windows on both floors. Internally, the principal room was the ballroom on the first floor: in the 19th century the building was mainly used as a venue for civic events.

The 10th Corps, Wiltshire Rifle Volunteer Corps, part of the Volunteer Force, was raised at the town hall in December 1859 and the armoury was initially based in the basement of the building. A large crowd gathered at the town hall when, in November 1876, the youngest son of Queen Victoria, Prince Leopold, who was interested in freemasonry, attended the annual meeting of the Provincial Grand Lodge of Wiltshire in the building. Prince Leopold had recently taken up residence seven miles away at Boyton Manor. Some 100 panes of glass were broken and the porch suffered structural damage in a bomb explosion on 14 January 1885; two men, who claimed to be pranksters, were given prison sentences for their role in the incident.

The third meeting of the recently created Wiltshire County Council was held at the Warminster town hall on 1 July 1889.

Following significant population growth, largely associated with Warminster's status as a market town, in 1894 the parish became an urban district, with the town hall as its headquarters. The 5th Marquess of Bath transferred ownership of the town hall to the new council in 1904. The ground floor room was subsequently used as a courtroom for petty sessions, quarter sessions and for county court hearings, while the ballroom on the first floor was used for council meetings; there were also seven cells in the basement for holding petty criminals. The building continued to serve as the headquarters of council for much of the 20th century but ceased to be the local seat of government after the enlarged West Wiltshire District Council was formed at Trowbridge in 1974. The building was then deemed surplus to requirements and was sold for commercial use in 1979.

The ballroom on the first floor was converted into a new courtroom for magistrates' court hearings in 1982 and continued to be used in that way until hearings moved to Trowbridge in 1991. After the owner got into financial difficulties, the building began to deteriorate and was eventually bought out of administration by a developer, Devo Developments, in July 2011. Devo Developments was unable to secure planning permission for its proposals and the building was sold on to a local group of businessmen in February 2012. A programme of refurbishment works was subsequently completed, enabling a wine bar to be established in the basement and the ground floor to be made ready for retail use.
