= 12–16 Church Street, Monmouth =

Row of three shop houses, circa 1837, by George Vaughan Maddox, in Monmouth, Wales

12–16 Church Street
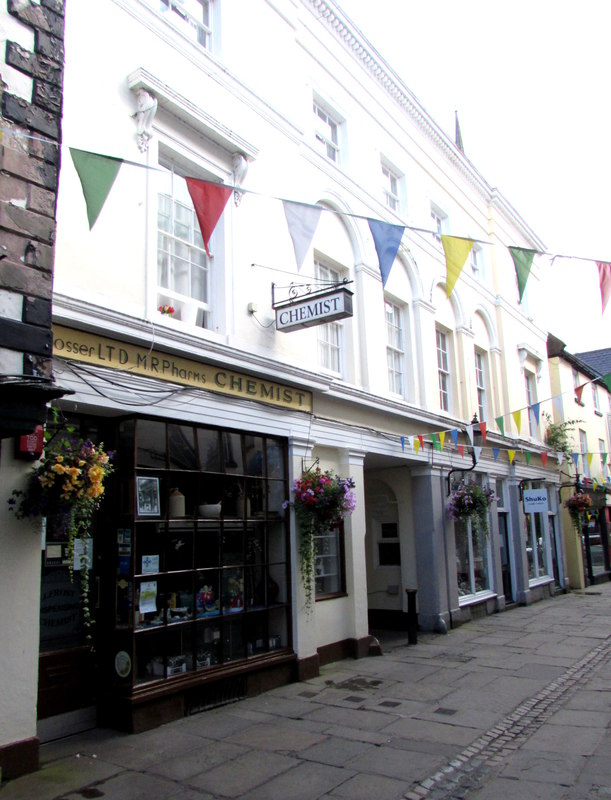
- 12–16 Church Street, from No.12

- Location within Monmouthshire
- 51.8128°N 2.7147°W
- Type: Shops / Houses
- Location: Monmouth, Monmouthshire

History
- Built: c. 1837

Site notes
- Architect: George Vaughan Maddox
- Architectural style: Neoclassical
- Governing body: Privately owned

Listed Building – Grade II*
- Official name: NOS.12,14 & 16 Church Street, Monmouth
- Designated: 10 August 2005
- Reference no.: 2253, 85030 & 85038

12–16 Church Street in Monmouth, Wales, is a row of three shop houses designed by the architect George Vaughan Maddox and constructed c. 1837. They form part of Maddox's redevelopment of the centre of Monmouth and stand on Church Street, to the rear of Maddox's Priory Street. The architectural historian John Newman has written that Maddox's work "gives Monmouth its particular architectural flavour" and Cadw describes the grouping of 12–16 Church Street as "the best preserved early 19th century shopfront in Monmouth."

== History ==
In the early 19th century, the main thoroughfare out of Monmouth towards London was along Church Street, a relatively narrow street now pedestrianised. Increasing traffic on the street led to a number of accidents and demands for the construction of a new road. At the same time, developments at the Shire Hall in Agincourt Square meant that the market, previously located there, required new accommodation. In 1834, the Town Council offered a prize for a redevelopment scheme, which was won by George Vaughan Maddox. Maddox, the son of another Monmouthshire architect, John Maddox, had already established a reputation within the town. Maddox's proposals envisaged a new road, described by John Newman as, "a remarkably early inner bypass", that would run north of Church Street along the west bank of the River Monnow. This would allow the redevelopment of Church Street and here Maddox constructed the block comprising 12–16, with an entry into White Swan Court CADW is of the view that the building has probably held a dispensary since the time of its construction, a period of 180 years.

== Description ==
Numbers 12–16 Church Street form a single block of three storeys and four bays. The building backs onto Priory Street and has an arched entranceway into White Swan Court. Architectural elaboration includes a "heavy" architrave and a cornice at the roofline. The grouping is designated a Grade II* listed building, the high listing for "its exceptional architectural interest as part of an important piece of early 19th century town planning in the Monmouth centre."

== Sources ==
- Heath, Charles (1804). Historical and descriptive accounts of the ancient and present state of the town of Monmouth. Monmouth: Charles Heath. OCLC 18491234.
- Kissack, Keith (1975). Monmouth: The Making Of A County Town. Chichester: Phillimore. ISBN 0-85033-209-5.
- Kissack, Keith (2003). Monmouth and its Buildings. Woonton Almeley: Logaston Press. ISBN 1-904396-01-1. OCLC 55143853.
- Newman, John (2000). Gwent/Monmouthshire. The Buildings of Wales. London: Penguin. ISBN 0-14-071053-1.
