= Warminster Athenaeum =

Theatre in Warminster, England

Coordinates: 51.2053°N 2.1823°W

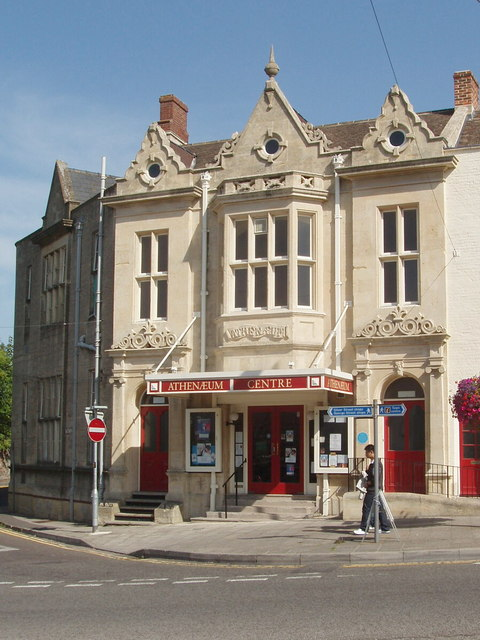
Athenaeum Centre, Warminster

Warminster Athenaeum is a Victorian theatre in Warminster, Wiltshire, England, and a Grade II listed building. Built in Jacobean style in 1857/8 to designs by William Jervis Stent, it is held in trust on behalf of the residents of Warminster by a charitable trust and is Wiltshire's oldest working theatre. It is perhaps the oldest non-cinema venue in the country to still be showing films - the first having been presented in 1897.

The building was originally a literary institution with a large lecture room, a reading room, classrooms and a library. Lectures, entertainment, plays and concerts were held. From 1895 the building was owned by the Urban District Council. In 1912, Albany Ward leased the auditorium and converted it into the Palace Cinema which was also used for plays, operas and music. It ran for fifty two years as a cinema, presenting over 13,000 films. Most parts of the building closed after falling into disrepair in December 1964, with just a gentlemen's club remaining on the first floor.

The Athenaeum reopened after much restoration in 1969 as an Art Centre presenting an ambitious programme of arts; music, dance, cinema, plays, concerts and exhibitions. After falling into financial difficulty and liquidation, in February 1997, the building was rescued by a steering group who reformed the charity and reopened the whole building as The Athenaeum Centre for the Community in September 2000. The trust launched a restoration appeal, and by 2015 had already spent over £100,000 on the building, cleaning the facade, replacing the roof, and refurbishing the bar and function room. The Centre continues to host shows, plays, concerts, lectures and films.
