= Warminster =

Market town in Wiltshire, England

Coordinates: 51.205°N 2.181°W

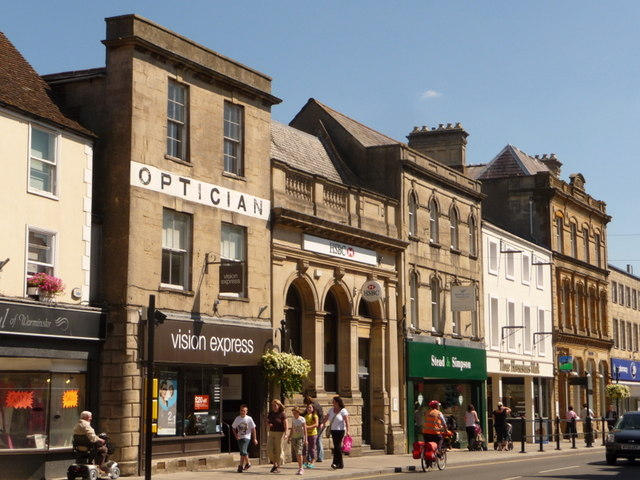
- Market Place, Warminster

- Location within Wiltshire
- Population: 18,173 (2021 Census)
- OS grid reference: ST875455
- Unitary authority: Wiltshire
- Ceremonial county: Wiltshire
- Region: South West
- Country: England
- Sovereign state: United Kingdom
- Post town: Warminster
- Postcode district: BA12
- Dialling code: 01985
- Police: Wiltshire
- Fire: Dorset and Wiltshire
- Ambulance: South Western
- UK Parliament: South West Wiltshire
- Website: Town Council

Warminster (/ˈwɔːrmɪnstər/) is a historic market town and civil parish in south-west Wiltshire, England, on the western edge of Salisbury Plain. The parish had a population of 18,173 in 2021.

The name Warminster occurs first in the early 10th century and the Minster Church of St Denys was begun in the 11th century. The High Street and Market Place have many fine buildings including the Athenaeum Centre, the Town Hall, St Lawrence Chapel, The Old Bell and a variety of independent shops. Several Army establishments, known collectively as the Warminster Garrison, are on the edges of the town.

== Etymology ==
The origin of the root Wor is wara, the genitive plural of the Old English noun waru meaning "those that care for, watch, guard, protect, or defend." It was used as an endonym by both Goths (Note: Warmia and Warsaw.) and Jutes. Their specific ethnonym is unknown, though it likely was related to the native name of the oppidum at Battlesbury Camp during Sub-Roman times.

The town's name has evolved over time; it was known as Worgemynstre in the early tenth century and was recorded as Guerminstre in the Domesday Book. The noun minster derives from Old English mynster meaning monastery, nunnery, mother church or cathedral, and was given to the town by Saxon settlers in the seventh century.

== History ==
=== Early history ===
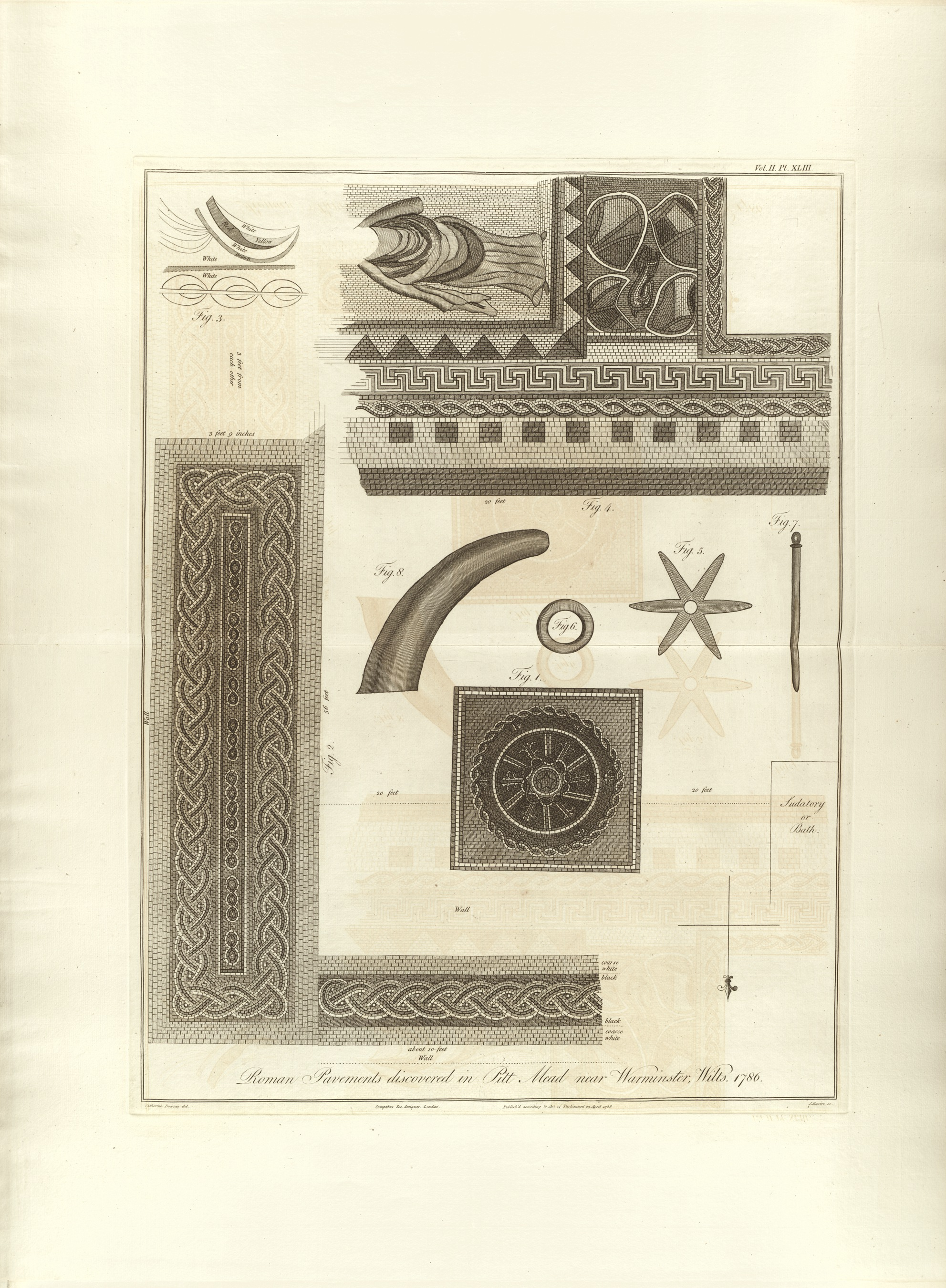
Pit Mead Roman villa mosaic, illustrations by Catherine Downes, engraved by James Basire and presented to the SAL by Daines Barrington

The main settlement at Warminster dates back to the Anglo-Saxon period, although there is evidence of pre-historic settlements in the area, especially at the nearby Iron Age hill forts: Battlesbury Camp, Scratchbury Camp and Cley Hill. Two Roman villas have been discovered in the area, as have caches of Roman coins.

By the 10th century, Warminster included a royal manor and an Anglo-Saxon minster, with the residents largely associated with the estate. The royal manor was passed to new lords in the 12th century, during which time the township started to grow. In the 13th century a market was set up at Warminster, and by 1377 the town had 304 poll-tax payers, the tenth largest in Wiltshire.

=== Civil war ===
During the Civil War, between 1642 and 1645, the town was the site of a few incidents. A major for the "Roundheads", Henry Wansey, was besieged in Warminster, while a force under Edmund Ludlow entered a skirmish on Warminster Common when trying to relieve him. By 1646, the town had suffered £500 (equivalent to £95,543 in 2025) worth of damages by supporting the Roundheads.

=== Post-medieval prosperity ===
The market at Warminster was the focus of the town's prosperity, with significant wool, clothing and malting trades established by the 16th century and continuing to be the economic backbone of the town until the 19th century. The market also included a significant corn trade throughout the period and was regarded as the second largest corn market in the west of England in 1830. Unlike many markets of the time where farmers would take only samples to market, Warminster's corn market required a sack from each load of corn to be available to customers; each purchase was to be agreed between 11am and 1pm and paid for by the end of the day.

The town had a large amount of accommodation for visitors to the market, and in 1686 it was ranked fourth for number of places to stay in Wiltshire, with 116 beds. By 1710 there were approximately fifty inns and alehouses in the town. The town was an early adopter of the Turnpikes Act to improve the roads around the town. Unlike many roads improved at the time which would link to towns, Warminster chose to improve seven roads around the town, all under 3 miles (5 km) long.

By the late 18th century some 200 dwellings had been built under squatter's rights near Warminster Common, many of them substandard and overcrowded. William Daniell, a 19th-century Methodist minister, reported the reminiscences of a woman born there in the 1770s: unplastered hovels with earth floors, and piles of filth which poisoned the Cannimore Brook, bringing typhus and smallpox. The people were considered rude and drunk criminals. Daniell and members of the clergy were keen to help the residents, and by 1833 the area was considered clean and respectable.

=== 19th and 20th centuries ===
The town centre was redesigned after 1807 when George Wansey, from a family of clothiers in Warminster, left £1,000 (equivalent to £79,486 in 2025) to improve the town, provided his money could be matched by local fundraising. The amount raised was spent on demolishing houses to widen roads. In 1851, a railway line from Westbury was opened, and then in 1856 the line was continued to Salisbury. The railway had a devastating effect on the town's market, which fell away almost to nothing; the shops and inns lost most of their business, and the local industries declined.

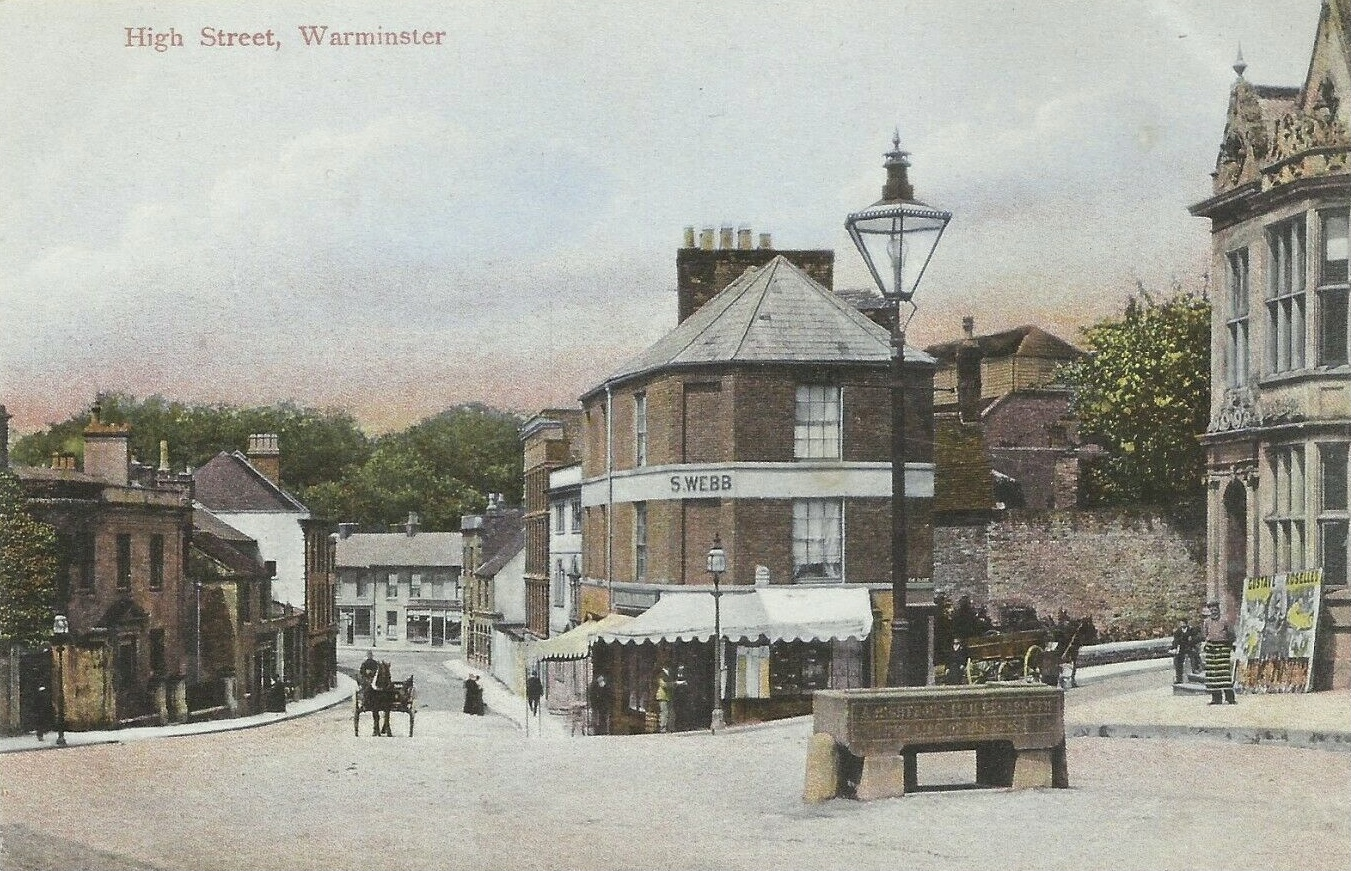
The High Street, Warminster, c. 1905

In 1907, a committee was put together to advertise the town, creating a town guide and advertising in national publications. The committee could not come to an agreement with Lord Bath over the location of a new hotel.

The headquarters and factory of luxury glovemakers Dents moved to the town in 1937, where it has remained since.

Between 1937 and 1965, a significant military presence formed at Warminster, with the addition of camps, a permanent barracks at Battlesbury, married quarters, a School of Infantry, and workshops for vehicle repairs.

== Religious sites ==
=== Church of England ===
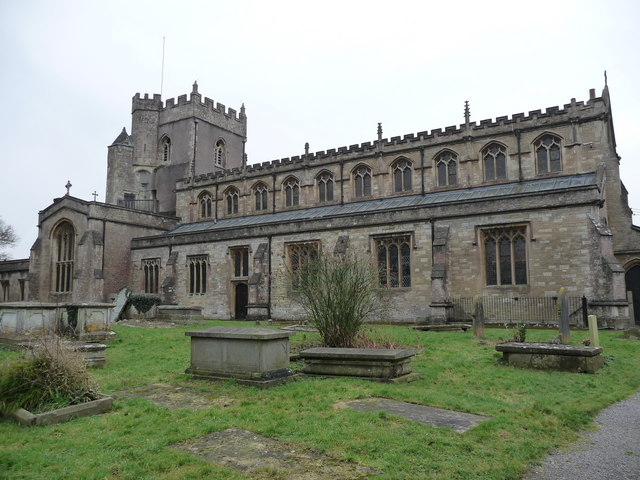
The Minster Church of St Denys

St Denys's Church is the town's oldest, and is claimed to have had minster status, as there was a church here in the 10th century. Rebuilding was carried out in the 14th century, and in 1889 the church was mostly rebuilt, with a longer nave.

As the town's population grew in the 19th century, two more churches were built: Christ Church in 1831 to serve the south of the town, and St John's in 1865 in the southeast. All three churches are listed, St Denys' and St John's churches are Grade II* and Christ Church is Grade II.

==== Town chapel ====
The chapel of St Lawrence, on the High Street near the market place, has been a chapel-of-ease to St Denys since at least 1290. Its tower is from the late 13th or early 14th century, but the rest was rebuilt in 1855–7. The people of the town bought the chapel in 1574, giving it the status of a non-royal peculiar outside the jurisdiction of the Church of England. Since then has been administered by feoffees (trustees) on behalf of the town, and they invite the vicar of St Denys' to hold services.

=== Others ===
Methodists built a chapel on George Street, west of the town centre, in 1804; it was rebuilt in 1861. The congregation amalgamated with the United Reformed Church in 1983 to form the United Church. A predecessor of the URC opened a chapel at Common Close in 1720, which by 1829 had a congregation of 900, leading to the chapel being rebuilt for a second time in 1839; notable ministers included Daniel Fisher (1752 to 1771) and Geoffrey Nuttall (1938 to 1943). Numbers fell in the 20th century, and after the 1983 amalgamation the chapel was demolished in 1987.

The Baptist chapel in North Row, off the High Street, was built in 1810 using red brick with stone dressings; by 1829 there were 250 in the congregation. Its interior was remodelled c.1850.

St Giles' Garrison Church, Imber Road, was built in 1968.

St George's Roman Catholic Church, Boreham Road, in the Diocese of Clifton, was built in 1922 to designs of Bristol architect Sir Frank William Wills.

=== College and convent ===
James Erasmus Philipps, vicar of St Denys from 1859 to 1897, raised funds in 1860 to found a college for young men in a house on Church Street. It evolved into a missionary college called St Boniface Missionary College, and its building was greatly enlarged in 1901 and 1927. From 1948 until closure in 1969, as Warminster Theological College, it was a post-graduate facility of King's College London. Today its buildings are part of Warminster School.

Philipps also led the foundation of an order of nuns, the Community of St Denys, in 1879. The nuns ran St Monica's School for Girls, which merged with Lord Weymouth's Grammar School in 1973 to form Warminster School. Since the retirement of the last nun in the early 21st century, the order operates as a grant-making charity.

== Notable buildings and structures ==
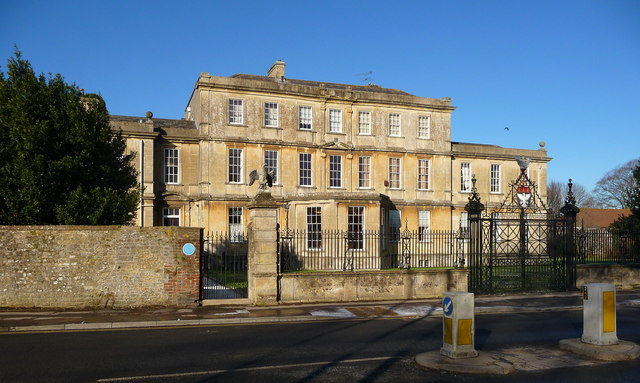
Portway House

Warminster has one Grade I listed building: Portway House, to the north of the town centre, built for a wealthy clothier in 1722. The Bath stone house has a seven-bay front flanked by later extensions, and is set back from the road behind ornamental ironwork dated 1760.

Other Bath stone houses include 38–40 Market Place, late 18th century or early 19th, now shops at street level; and The Chantry, 34 High Street. Both are Grade II* listed.

Further Grade II* listed buildings include the churches of St Denys and St John; Byne House, Church Street, 1755; and Warminster School, 1708, endowed by Lord Weymouth, two storeys with attic, seven-bay front. Wren House, Vicarage Street, of 1720 or 1730, is described by Historic England as "a fine example of an early Georgian 5-bay house". The Pound Street maltings, at what was the western edge of the town, are a rebuilding of 1879 in rubble stone with some ashlar. The Athenaeum Centre, designed by William Jervis Stent and built in 1857, is Wiltshire's oldest working theatre and has been showing films since 1897.

At the triangular junction of Vicarage Street and Silver Street stands a tall stone obelisk, crowned with a reeded urn and pineapple, which was erected in 1873 on the site of an earlier high cross to commemorate the inclosure of the parish.

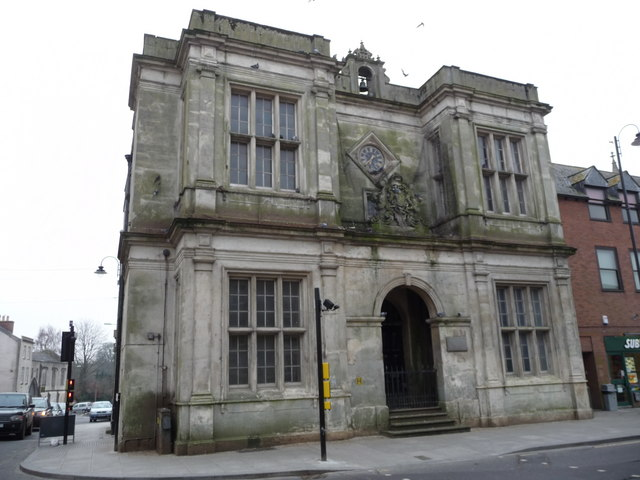
Warminster Town Hall

Warminster Town Hall, at the junction of the High Street and Weymouth Street, was designed c. 1837 by Edward Blore at the expense of the 5th Marquess of Bath; the two-storey front elevation is a replica of Longleat, with the addition of a central bellcote, clock and coat of arms. The building was sold by the district council in 1979.

== Governance ==
Warminster falls within the parliamentary constituency of South West Wiltshire, which has been represented since 2001 by Andrew Murrison for the Conservatives.

There are two levels of local government: Wiltshire Council – the unitary authority for the county – and Warminster Town Council, which has 13 elected councillors.

Until 2009, when it was abolished, West Wiltshire District Council acted as the second tier of local government.

== Geography ==
Warminster is in south-west Wiltshire, near to the Somerset border. The town is surrounded by six hills, providing shelter and security for early settlers. Warminster is also close to the former Selwood Forest.

A minor river known as The Were flows through the town to join the River Wylye on the south-east outskirts.

Climate data for Bath (Nearest climate station to Warminster)
Month	Jan	Feb	Mar	Apr	May	Jun	Jul	Aug	Sep	Oct	Nov	Dec	Year
Mean daily maximum °C (°F)	7.6 (45.7)	7.9 (46.2)	10.5 (50.9)	13.5 (56.3)	16.7 (62.1)	19.7 (67.5)	22.7 (72.9)	21.5 (70.7)	18.8 (65.8)	14.6 (58.3)	10.7 (51.3)	8.0 (46.4)	14.3 (57.7)
Mean daily minimum °C (°F)	1.9 (35.4)	1.7 (35.1)	3.5 (38.3)	4.6 (40.3)	7.5 (45.5)	10.4 (50.7)	12.5 (54.5)	12.4 (54.3)	10.3 (50.5)	7.6 (45.7)	4.5 (40.1)	2.3 (36.1)	6.6 (43.9)
Average rainfall mm (inches)	82.5 (3.25)	53.2 (2.09)	63.7 (2.51)	56.9 (2.24)	59.7 (2.35)	51.9 (2.04)	55.8 (2.20)	65.7 (2.59)	66.6 (2.62)	88.5 (3.48)	82.7 (3.26)	87.2 (3.43)	824.1 (32.44)
Source: Met Office

The former hamlets of Bugley (west of the town on the Frome road) and Boreham (east towards Bishopstrow) are now part of Warminster's suburbs.

== Population ==
The Domesday survey of 1086 recorded 104 households, largely craftsmen for the royal demesne, but the population had grown by 1377 to 304 poll-tax payers, making Warminster the tenth largest village in Wiltshire. In 1665, the population had increased to 354 households, approximately 1,800 people. The area contained by the turnpike gates included 2,605 people in 1781.

Historical population of Warminster
Year	1801	1811	1821	1831	1841	1851	1861	1871	1881	1891	1901
Population	4,932	4,866	5,612	6,115	6,211	6,285	5,995	5,786	5,640	5,563	5,547
Year	1911	1921	1931	1941	1951	1961	1971	1981	1991	2001	2011
Population	5,492	5,387	5,176	–	7,660	9,860	13,554	15,089	16,267	17,377	17,490
Census: 1801–2011

== Economy ==
As Warminster is in an area of fertile land, much of its early economy was through farming, especially cereals. William Daniell commented in 1879 that Warminster lay 'in the midst of a fine corn-country', and Warminster's market provided the backbone of the economy through the 16th to 19th centuries. Alongside cereals, wool and clothing were traded and there were a number of maltings in the town.

Warminster's clothing trade suffered greatly in the early 19th century, as there was no suitable river to power machinery during a period of industrialisation. At the same time its malting trade declined but remained important. In 1855, William Morgan commissioned the Pound Street Maltings, which Pevsner found to be derelict in 1974; today, malt is again produced there under new management.

The coming of the railway line from Westbury in 1851, continued to Salisbury in 1856, had a devastating effect on the town's market, which fell away almost to nothing, and the shops and inns lost most of their business. In 1860, Warminster was described as "a clean-swept, semi-aristocratic, decidedly poor place... in a lukewarm, stagnant, bankrupt state." However, by that year the town had begun to adopt new trades in brewing and iron-founding, which eventually grew enough to mitigate the loss of other business. One example was the Woodcock Ironworks, set up by John Wallis Titt in the town in the mid-1870s to make agricultural machines.

During the 20th century, Warminster's economy became more dependent on the British Army and its associated service industries, but other new businesses also came into the area, such as intensive poultry farming, banana ripening, and shoe manufacture. During the late 20th century and early 21st century, the leisure industry has grown in the area, with Longleat and Center Parcs Longleat Forest becoming significant employers.

== Amenities ==
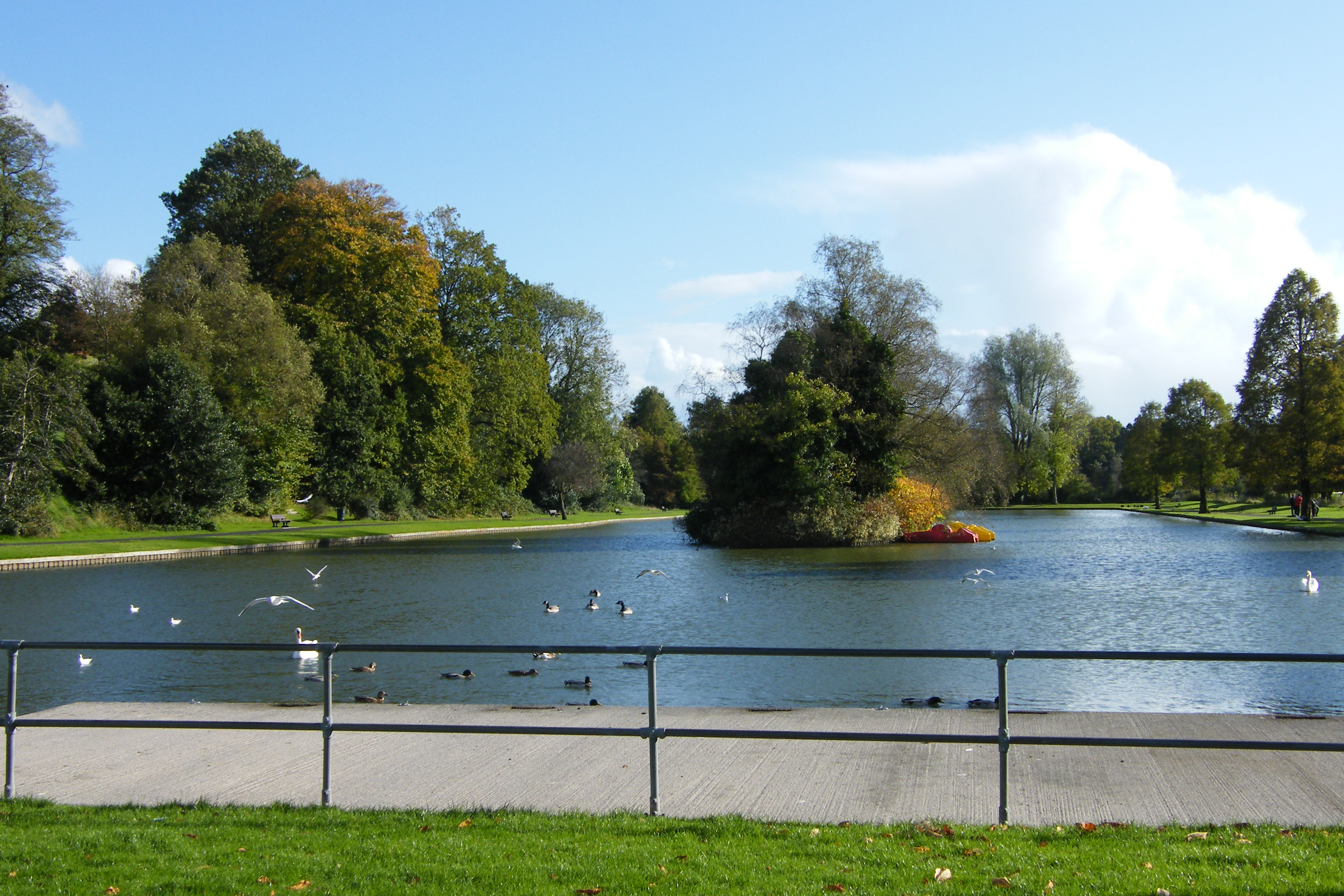
The boating lake at the Pleasure Grounds

Warminster has a library, museum, theatre, sports centre with pool, and a selection of independent shops and restaurants, as well as a thriving community, including a choral society called 'The Athenaeum Singers'. Annual events in the area include an illuminated carnival, a vintage bus run and heritage open days.

The Athenaeum is an 1858 Grade II listed building and Wiltshire's oldest working theatre venue. Originally a literary institution, with lectures, plays and concerts, and later a cinema and arts centre, it is now a theatre and centre for the community. Facilities at the Lakeside Pleasure Grounds (run by Warminster Town Council) include children's play activities, tennis courts, a skate park, children's splash pool and a boating lake leading to the Henford's Marsh nature reserve; the park was opened by Thomas Thynne, 5th Marquess of Bath, in 1924 on the site of the town's former rubbish tip. A children's play area was added in 1938 with a grant from the national King George V memorial foundation.

About 4 miles (6 km) to the west is Longleat, the country house of the Marquess of Bath, and its estate which has included Longleat Safari Park since 1966; the first drive-through safari park outside Africa, it is home to over 500 animals, including giraffes, monkeys, rhinos, lions, tigers and wolves. The nearby Longleat Forest is also home to a Center Parcs holiday village.

== Media ==
The Warminster Journal is the local paid-for weekly newspaper. Published since 1881, it covers the surrounding villages as well as the town. The town is also within the area of the Wiltshire Times, another weekly newspaper.

Local news and television programmes are provided by BBC West and ITV West Country. Television signals are received from the Mendip and local relay transmitters.

BBC Radio Wiltshire is the BBC Local Radio public service station for the county. Warminster Community Radio (WCR) is the local community station broadcasting from the Civic Centre on 105.5 FM and online. Warminster is the centre of a small commercial radio licensing area, available on 107.5 FM. The licence was first held from 2001 by 3TR FM (Three Towns Radio; referring to Warminster, Westbury and Frome) but from 2008 went through several changes of ownership and station name. Since 2019 the station has been owned by Bauer Radio, and in September 2020 it was rebranded to Greatest Hits Radio which broadcasts national and regional music programmes.

== Military presence ==
The British Army's Waterloo Lines, formerly the Land Warfare Centre, is home to a number of Army specialist training schools and a sizeable portion of the Headquarters Field Army (not to be confused with Army HQ in Andover). The site is also home to Headquarters Small Arms School Corps and Headquarters Infantry, which was formed in 1996 and is responsible for the recruiting, manning and training policies of the Infantry. Harman Lines is a smaller installation nearby; in 2013, elements of the Royal Tank Regiment were here.

Battlesbury Barracks (near the ancient Battlesbury Camp) is the home of the Royal Dragoon Guards, an armoured cavalry regiment. Between 2005 and 2020, forces of the Yorkshire Regiment (latterly the 1st Battalion) were based here; the regiment's 3rd Battalion was awarded the freedom of the town in 2012.

== Transport ==
Warminster is at the junction of two primary routes, the A36 and the A350, which both now bypass the town to the south and west. There is a service area where the two roads meet. The A303 is about 7 miles (11 km) south of the town, and junctions 17 and 18 of the M4 are 22 miles (35 km) to the north.

Warminster railway station, which opened in 1851, is a stop on the Wessex Main Line. It is served by two train operating companies:

- Great Western Railway operates regular services to Bristol Temple Meads, Cardiff Central, Southampton and Portsmouth Harbour; London Paddington can be reached by changing at Westbury. GWR also manages the station.
- South Western Railway operates services between London Waterloo and Yeovil Pen Mill, via Salisbury.

Warminster's bus services are operated by First Bristol, Beeline Coaches and FromeBus. Routes connect the town with Bath, Frome and Salisbury. Berrys Coaches operates the Superfast 3 route between Taunton and London.

== Sport ==
Warminster has a long history of sporting activities, with many clubs established in the 19th century. Warminster Cricket Club was created in 1838. Its facilities at Sambourne Road have been shared with the local hockey team and the Warminster Table Tennis Club. The West Wilts Hockey Club has origins dating back to 1899 and as of 2016 has 13 adult teams. The architect John Henry Taylor designed the town's West Wilts golf course, on Elm Hill, in 1891.

Warminster Town Football Club began around 1878 and the site at Weymouth Street was renovated and expanded in the 1990s; they play in Division One of the Western League. The town has a competitive swimming club, which began as part of Wiltshire County Amateur Swimming Association in 1907 and was re-established as Warminster and District Amateur Swimming Club in 1973. The Marquess of Bath is the President of Warminster Rugby Club which began in 1977 and in 1997 established its base at the West Wilts District Council owned Folly Lane multi-sports site.

More recent additions have been the Warminster Sports Centre run by Wiltshire Council, the Warminster Running Club, the Warminster Adventure Sports Club, and the Wessex Blades Fencing Club.

== Education ==
Warminster has several primary schools and two secondary schools: Warminster School, an independent public school which was founded in 1707, and Kingdown School which became an academy in 2011. Nearby Bishopstrow College prepares international students for boarding school.

== Public services ==
=== Utilities ===
Wessex Water supplies the town's water and sewage services, with water hardness in the town centre reported as 250 mg/L. The distribution network operator for both electricity and gas is SSE plc.

=== Healthcare ===
The town has one GP partnership, the Avenue Surgery. The small Warminster Community Hospital has been run since 2016 by Wiltshire Health and Care LLP, who provide community services here and at five other small Wiltshire hospitals. The hospital has an inpatient ward. The nearest minor injuries unit is at Frome, and the nearest general hospitals with Accident and Emergency departments are Salisbury District Hospital and the Royal United Hospital in Bath. Ambulances are provided by the South Western Ambulance Service.

=== Policing ===
The town is within the area of Wiltshire Police, who have a station at The Avenue, in the centre of the town near the fire station. Until 2021 the police station was at Station Road, but the Police and Crime Commissioner described that building as "not fit for purpose".

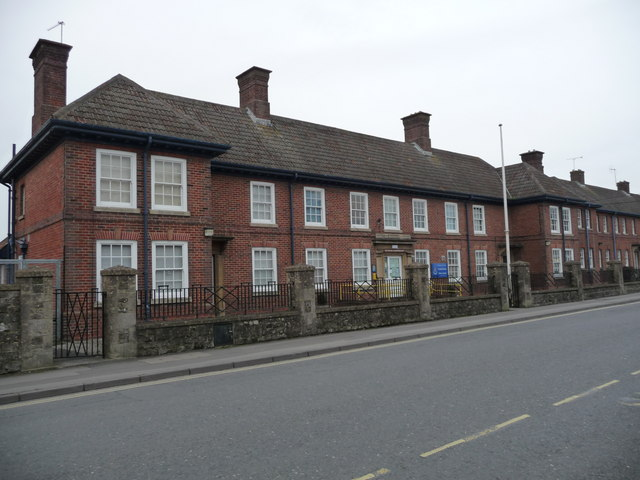
The former and now disused Warminster Police Station from Station Road

As of June 2020, the Community Policing Team consists of:

- Neighbourhood Inspector (for Warminster, Westbury, Mere and Tisbury)
- Neighbourhood Sergeant (for the same area)
- One Police Constable (PC)
- One Special Constable (SC)
- Three Police Community Support Officers (PCSO)

The Ministry of Defence Police and Royal Military Police are occasionally to be seen passing through the town, as Warminster Garrison and the Salisbury Plain training area are policed jointly by all three police organisations.

=== Fire Service ===
Warminster has a fire station (The Portway, Warminster, BA12 8QE) and its retained firefighters are provided by Dorset & Wiltshire Fire and Rescue Service. They respond to emergencies when alerted by their pagers.

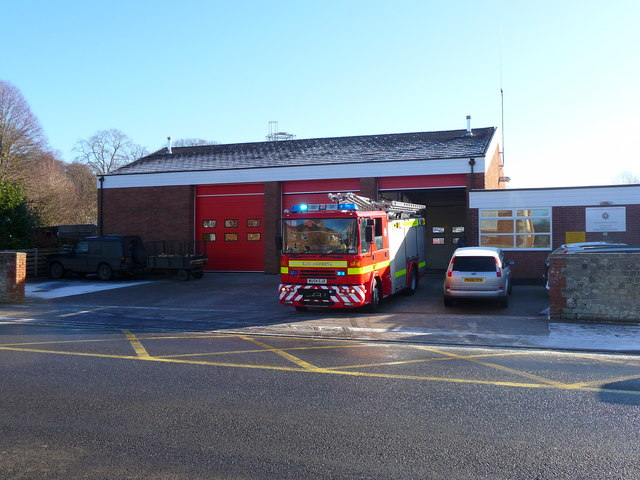
Warminster Community Fire Station and engine (2010)

== Notable people ==
- William Aldridge (1737–1797), independent minister
- Freddie Bartholomew (1924–1992), child actor
- Rupert E. Billingham (1921–2002), biologist
- Benjamin Buckler (1716–1780), antiquary
- Beryl May Dent (1900–1977), mathematical physicist
- Henry Huntingford (1787–1867), classical scholar and Church of England clergyman
- John Philipps, 1st Viscount St Davids (1860–1938), politician
- Henry Wansey (1751–1827), woollen manufacturer and traveller

== Twin towns ==
Warminster is twinned with:

- Flers, France
- Warminster, Pennsylvania, United States

== UFO sightings ==
Warminster was the location for a number of UFO sightings during the 1960s and 1970s. The first sighting was recorded on 25 December 1964 by Arthur Shuttlewood, who compiled a dossier of further sightings over the following year which he gave to the Daily Mirror to publish. The newspaper story gained the town some notoriety for UFO sightings, leading to a BBC documentary in 1966, several books on the sightings, a 2009 conference on UFOs, and a 2010 conference with UFO expert Nick Pope.

To mark the 60th anniversary of the sightings in 2025 a conference was held, which featured music from the Scottish Alternative rock band C.E.IV and was attended by 200 local residents.

== See also ==
Other places named Warminster:

- Warminster, Virginia, United States, an unincorporated community
- Warminster Township, Pennsylvania, United States
- Warminster, a community in the township of Oro-Medonte, Ontario, Canada
