= Cley Hill =

Hill in Wiltshire, England

Coordinates: 51.20308°N 2.23326°W

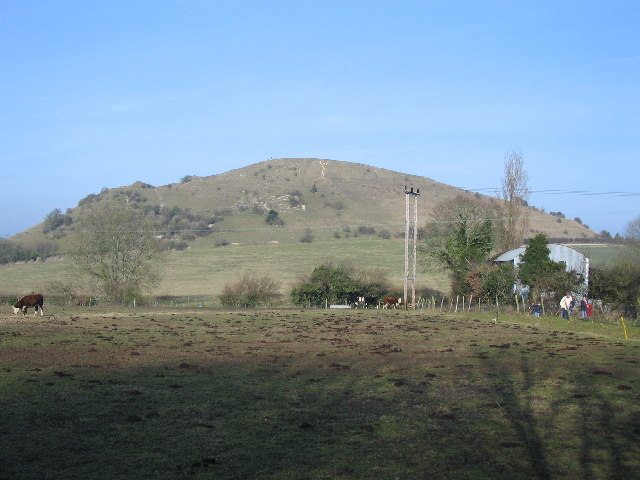
Cley Hill

LIDAR of Cley Hill Camp, showing erosion of the hill

Cley Hill (grid reference ST838449) is a prominent hill to the west of Warminster in Wiltshire, England. Its summit has a commanding view of the Wiltshire / Somerset county boundary, at 244 metres (801 ft) elevation. The land is in Corsley parish and is owned by the National Trust.

A 26.6-hectare (66-acre) area of chalk grassland at Cley Hill was notified as a biological Site of Special Scientific Interest in 1975. The land is managed by the National Trust, having been donated to the charity in 1954 by the 6th Marquess of Bath.

Archaeological features include a large univallate Iron Age hill fort, two bowl barrows and medieval strip lynchets. In 1812, local antiquarian Sir Richard Hoare attempted to excavate the mound at the top of the hill – leaving a hole which is still visible – but found that it had been looted by grave robbers.

The south west side of the hill was quarried significantly in the 19th century.

== Mythology ==
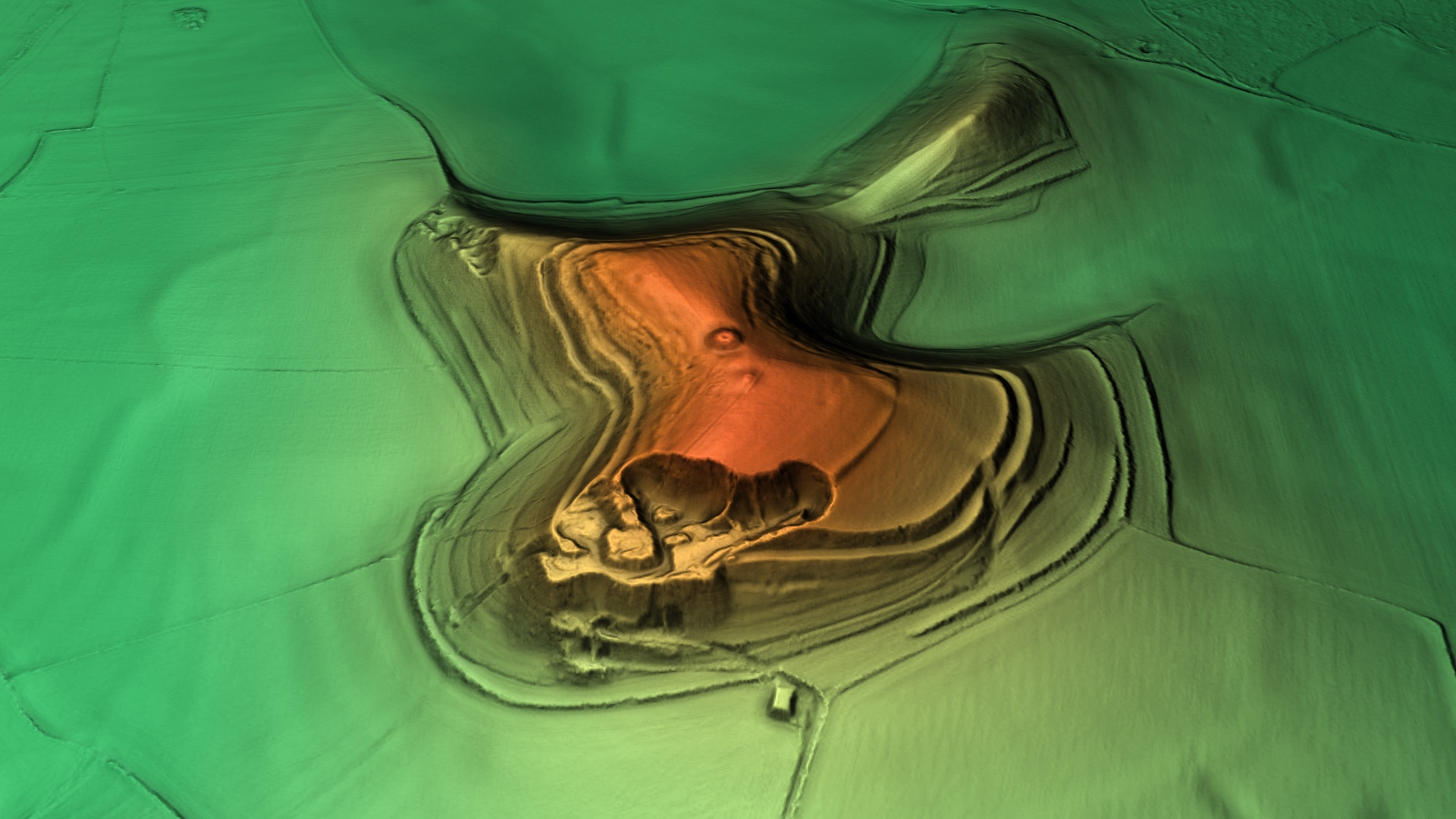
3D view of the digital terrain model

There is a legend that the hill was formed by the devil, when he dropped a sack of earth with which he had planned to bury the town of Devizes. He had retrieved the earth from Somerset and was travelling to Devizes when he stopped to ask an old man the distance to the town. The man replied that he had been walking for years to reach Devizes, so the devil abandoned his plan.

In 1924, V.S. Manley wrote in his book, Folklore of the Warminster District: a supplement to the History of Warminster and the Official Guide:

One of the most curious items is 'The Spirit of Cley Hill', a legend which would apparently have died with its narrator, an old woman of 80. The legend records that the guardian spirit of the Bugley folk lived inside the barrow on the top of the hill, and one day hearing water running beneath him he directed its course underground until it came out at Hogs Well. He told the people not to drink it but to use it only for curing weak eyes, and an old woman who disregarded his order and drank the water died that night, and a cow that polluted the water was drowned in the mud. It is in any case a fact that until recently this water has been in great request for bad eyes, 6d. a bottle being paid for it, provided some Ground Ivy was included to be brewed with it. The appearance of the Well Fiend is recorded of Bicker’s Well, in Prince Croft Lane, at Bugley, and under a large oak tree which formerly stood where North Lane meets the Half, below Blue Ball, Bugley, elves lived and might sometimes be seen gambolling by children.

Since the 1965 sighting of the "Warminster thing", Cley Hill has been a hotspot of UFO sightings and crop circles. Sightings were documented in 1967, 1996, 2001, 2005 and 2017.
