= Albany Ward =

Hannam Edward Albany Ward (6 November 1879 – 18 February 1966), known as Albany Ward, was a pioneer English theatre proprietor and cinema developer, who ran one of the largest cinema circuits in Britain in the early part of the twentieth century.

He was born Hannam Edward Bonnor in Stoke Newington, London, the youngest son of William Bonnor, a surgeon originally from Hereford, and his wife Emma. He was educated at Christ's Hospital. After leaving school he joined his widowed mother in Ilfracombe, Devon, before starting work in 1896 as an assistant to pioneer filmmaker Birt Acres in High Barnet. He then joined the Velograph Company, managed by Adolphe Langfier, as a projectionist, and began touring the country with films of such events as Queen Victoria's Diamond Jubilee. In 1898 he formed his own company and toured Wales and the south-west of England, becoming the first moving picture exhibitor in parts of the country. He introduced offstage sound effects, such as imitations of train and battle noises, to accompany the film showings.

He opened his first theatre, the Empire Theatre in Oxford, in 1900, showing a mixture of films and variety acts. By 1901 he was referring to himself simply as Albany Ward, with no forenames, and described himself as "Theatrical manager". He established his first permanent theatre, in Weymouth, Dorset, in 1906. The town became his main base and residence. He built up one of the largest circuits of cinemas in the country, owning 29 cinemas by 1914, mostly in small towns in the west of England and south Wales. In some cases, as at Exeter, Warminster and Monmouth, he took over and refurbished existing theatres; elsewhere, as at Chepstow, he had a new theatre built.

He sold his cinema and theatre chain to Provincial Cinematograph Theatres Ltd. (PCT) in 1920, while retaining management responsibilities for them as part of PCT. He formally changed his surname from Bonnor to Albany Ward by deed poll in 1922.

He married Edith Robertson in 1899. He married again in 1916, to Dorothy Hembrow; they had four children. He died in a nursing home in Torquay, Devon, in 1966 at the age of 86.
