= 18 Monnow Street =

Building in Monmouth, Wales

Coordinates: 51°48′41.09″N 2°42′59.11″W

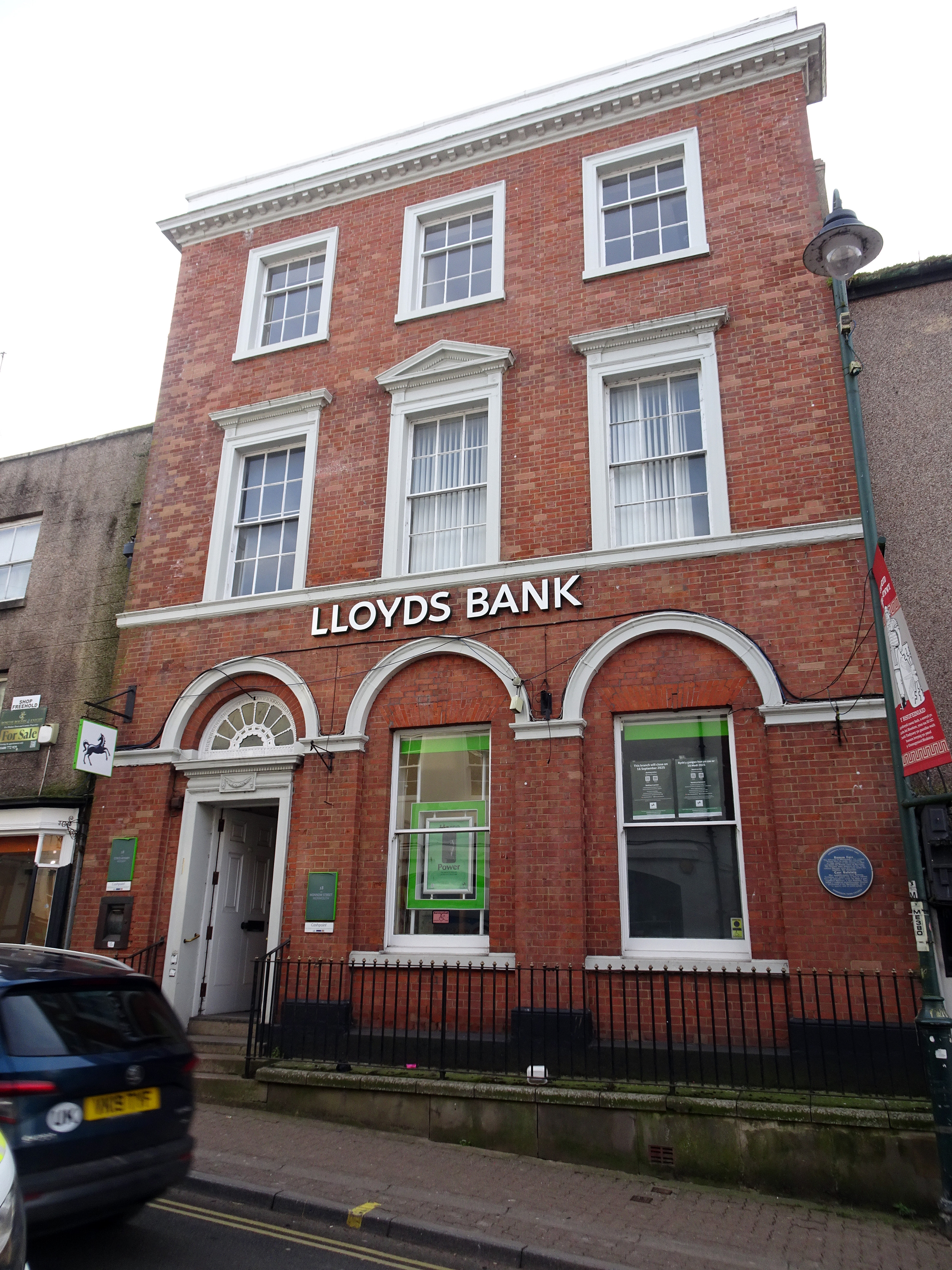

18 Monnow Street is a grade II listed building in the centre of Monmouth, Wales. The house is built above the remains of the Roman fort of Blestium. A plaque on the façade mentions the location of the fort.

== History ==
The house was occupied, and probably built, by Philip Meakins Hardwick, who was one of the founders of the Monmouth Picnic Club of local gentlemen responsible for developing the viewpoint and buildings on The Kymin around 1800. The buildings included a "Naval Temple" to commemorate the second anniversary of the British naval victory at the Battle of the Nile in 1798.

The house became the home of Monmouth's town clerk Colonel Lindsay. On one occasion Lindsay entertained notable visitors who have been described as forming a ménage à trois, Viscount Nelson, Lady Hamilton and Sir William Hamilton. During the break in hostilities following the Treaty of Amiens, the trio undertook a tour of Wales, visiting Monmouth on 19 August 1802. Having been served venison at the Beaufort Arms, the party adjourned to Lindsay's garden "to enjoy the refreshment of tea or coffee and to pass the rest of the evening in that charming retreat". The garden is now known as the Nelson Garden and is registered Grade II.

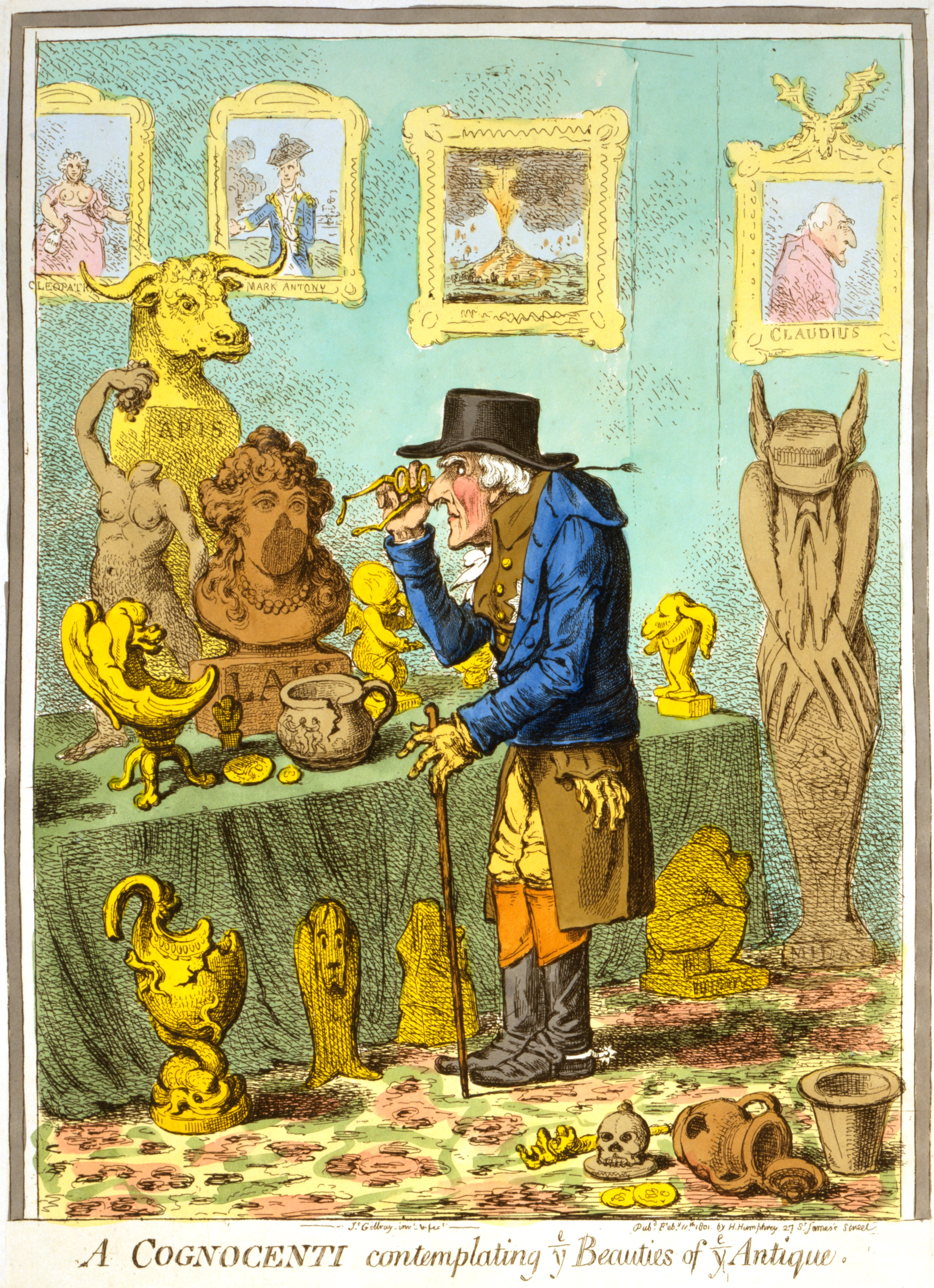
An elderly Sir William Hamilton inspecting his antiquities, all of which refer to his wife, Lady Emma Hamilton and her lover, Lord Horatio Nelson.

Another notable resident was said to be the architect Philip Fisher who lived at the house whilst designing improvements to the Shire Hall in the 1720s.

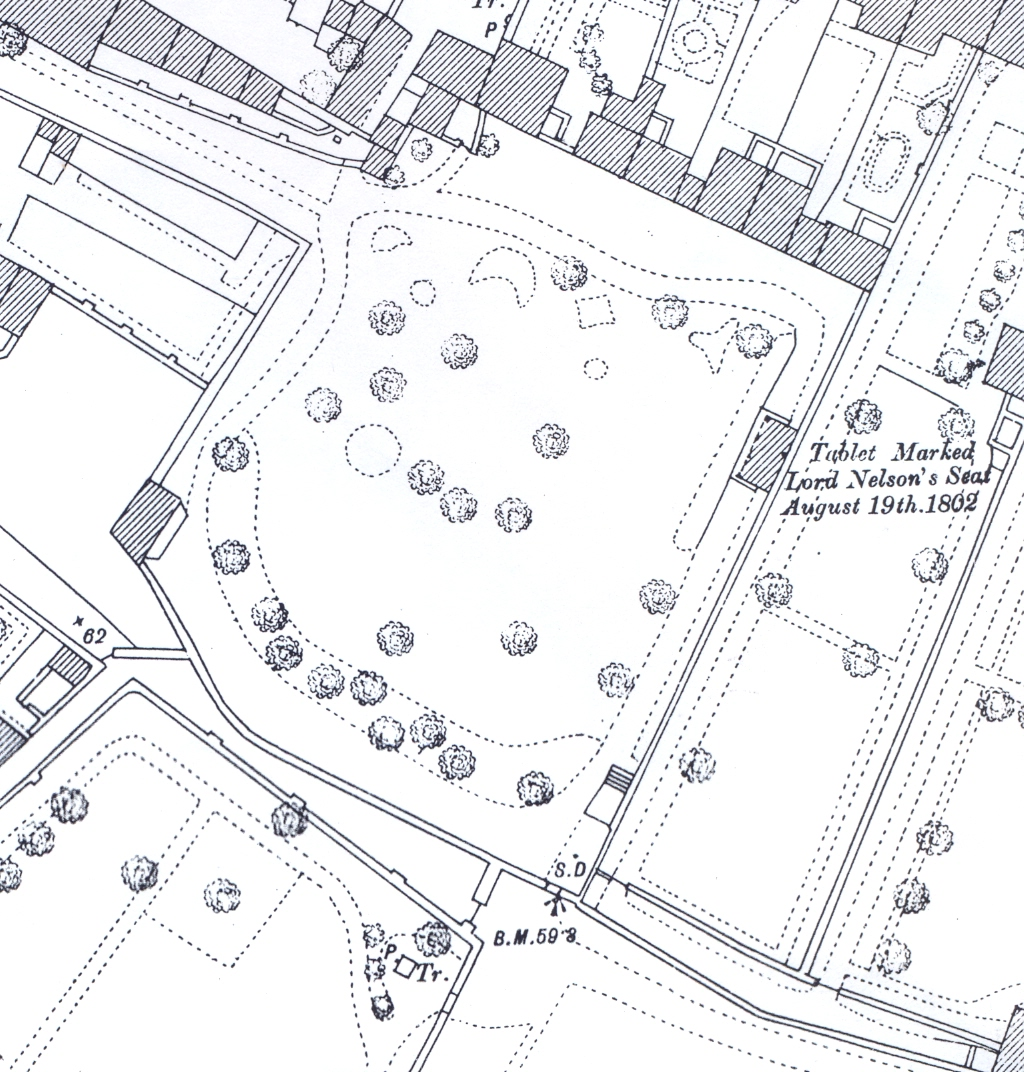
Map of the garden

=== Use as a bank ===
The building was listed in the 1950s when it was being used by Lloyds Bank. Cadw mentions that the building was a bank from at least 1916. The banking facilities were on the ground floor with residential accommodation above. The branch closed in 2025. Lloyds explained that customers were using alternative ways of banking.

== Architecture ==
The house is built of red brick in Flemish bond with stucco dressings.
