= Borsay =

Borsay is a Hungarian surname, meaning "Of the town of Borsa". Notable people with the surname include:

- Kait Borsay (born 1978), British television voiceover artist presenter
- Peter Borsay, professor of history at Aberystwyth University
