= The Vine Tree =

Public house in Monmouth, UK

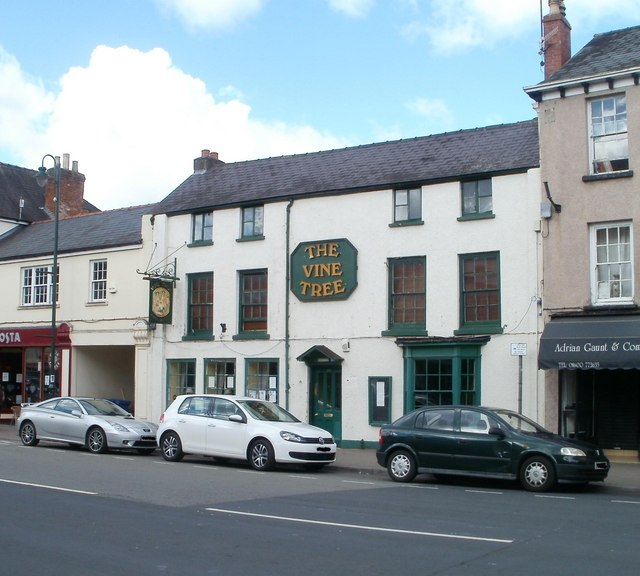
- The Vine Tree, Monmouth
- Interactive map of the The Vine Tree area
- Former names: The Coach and Horses

General information
- Type: Public House
- Location: 57 Monnow Street, Monmouth, Wales
- Coordinates: 51.8108°N 2.71794°W
- Completed: Before 1792

Design and construction
- Designations: Grade II Listed

The Vine Tree is a public house situated in Monnow Street in the town of Monmouth, Wales. The building has been a Grade II Listed building since 18 November 1970.

== Description ==
The front elevation is Georgian. The rear has been largely rebuilt but still has late Medieval windows. The rear part of the building is late-16th-century in date and is of box-framed construction, while the front part is 18th-century and was heightened in the 1800s. There is a Welsh slate roof. The building is of double depth central entry plan and is three storeys high. The centre door is narrow and panelled with a small pedimented hood. There is also a low pitch roof with a stack at either gable. The interior of the rear range is timber framed. The ground floor is box-framed and thought to date from about 1600.

== History ==
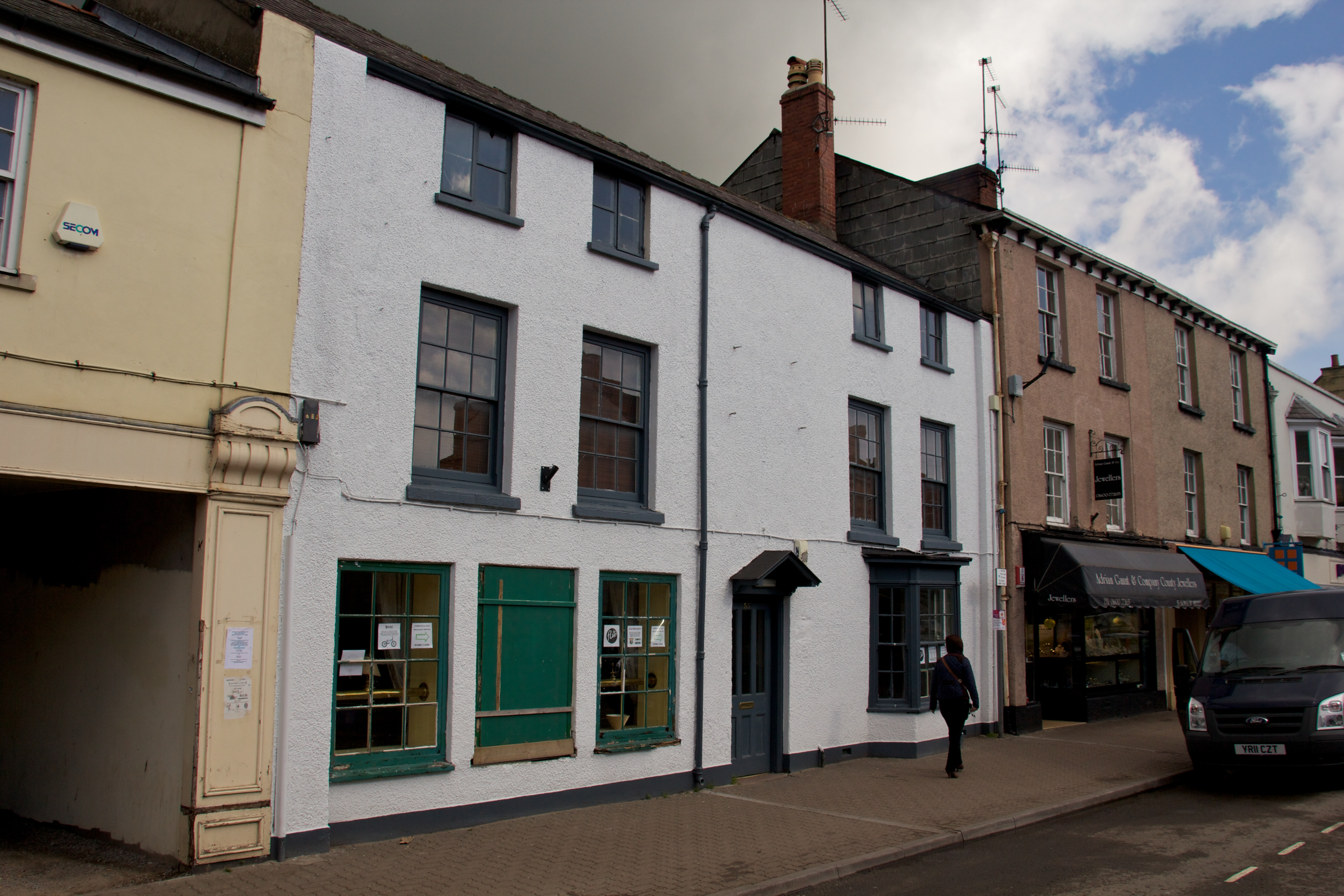
The Vine Tree in 2012

The pub was originally called "The Coach and Horses" and is one of the longest surviving inns in the town. In 1792 the buildings were purchased by Thomas Hill, a maltster, for £360. The building was actually two buildings before 1828. They were combined and the pub became "The Vine Tree" in 1820 under the management of James Hayward. In 1828 the pub was made up of a brewhouse, stables, cellars and gardens. When the Vine Tree was sold in 1842 details of occupations of people living in the rear of the inn revealed a gunsmith, cabinet maker, a tailor, a flax dresser, a baker, a glazier and a tea dealer. Ownership changed again in 1859 when Richard Jones purchased the inn for £720. The pub was sold again in 1920 to Albert Johnstone. The next owner in 1940 was the Alton Court Brewery based in Ross-on-Wye, Herefordshire. In 1962 it was owned by the West Country Breweries. The pub has also been owned by Whitbread.

The Vine Tree pub only opens by arrangement for special functions and is undergoing building work to convert it from a pub.
