= Monnow Street =

Street in Monmouth, Wales

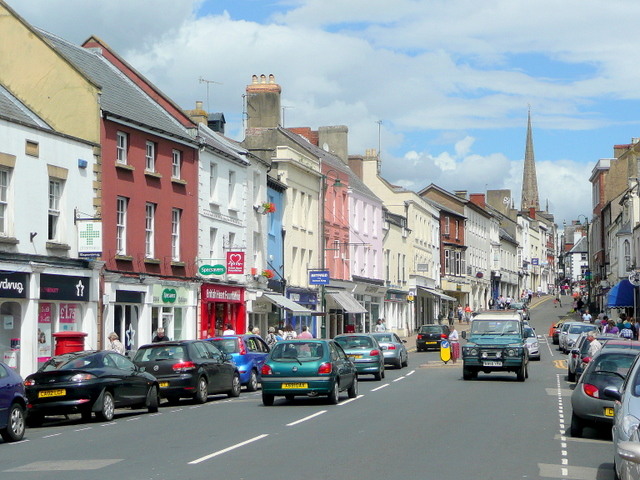
- Monnow Street, Monmouth
- Former name(s): Great Causey; Monmoth Street
- Location: Monmouth, Wales
- Coordinates: 51.810589°N 2.717738°W
- North: Agincourt Square
- South: Monnow Bridge

Monnow Street is the main shopping street of Monmouth, south east Wales. It runs for about 500 yards in a south-westerly direction from Agincourt Square to the Monnow Bridge, which crosses the River Monnow.

== History and buildings ==
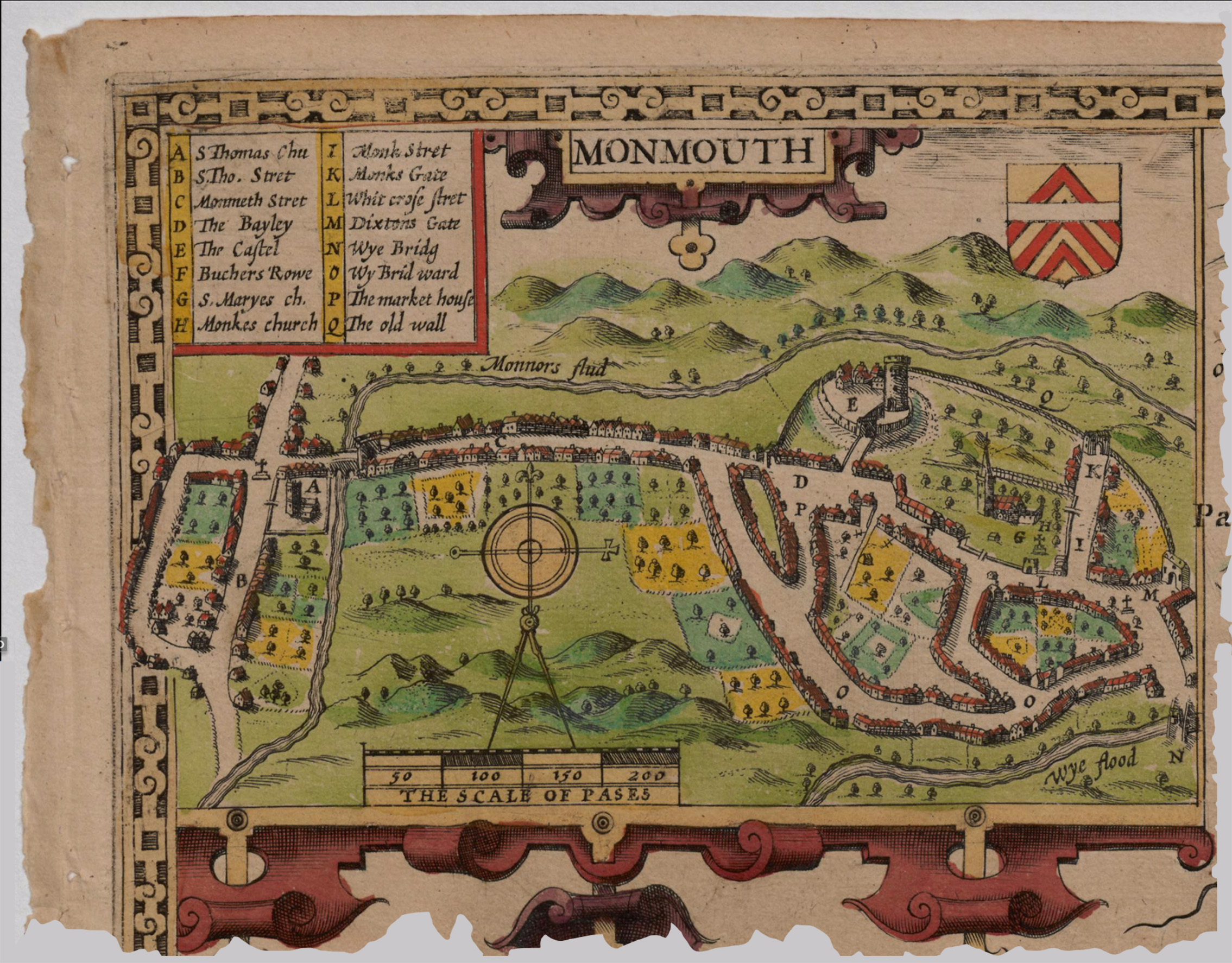
John Speed's town map of 1610, showing "Monmoth Street" (marked C)

The road is thought to have existed at least from Roman times. In the Middle Ages it was a typical market street, known as the "Great Causey", with gates at either end and a wider area in the middle for the trading of livestock and the erection of market stalls. The market was later concentrated at the northern end of the road (now Agincourt Square), and the road itself became known as Monmouth Street.

Archaeological investigations at properties in the street, led by the Monmouth Archaeological Society, have revealed both Roman and Norman remains, as well as evidence of mediaeval iron working. The street is described by architectural historian John Newman as a "pleasingly continuous array of C18 and early C19 shops and houses, in the main modestly two-storeyed, with several Victorian interventions".

Notable buildings include Cornwall House, The Vine Tree and the Robin Hood Inn.

== Gallery ==
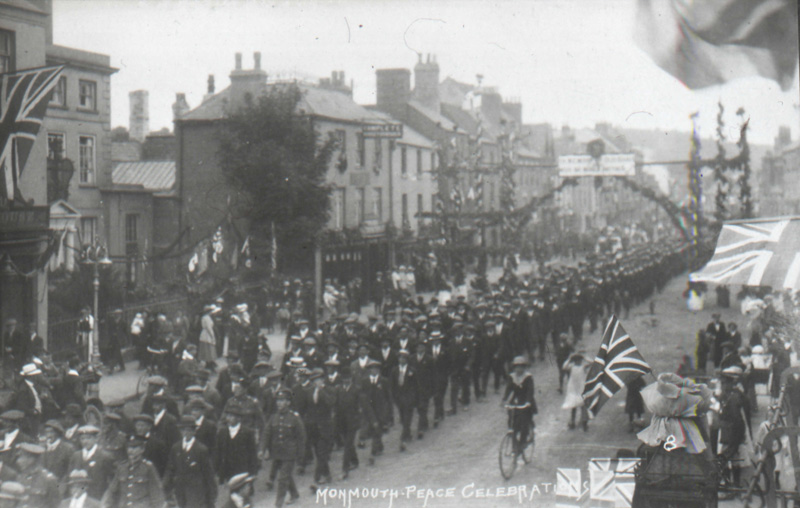
Monnow Street in July 1919, showing a procession of servicemen and civilians to celebrate peace after the First World War

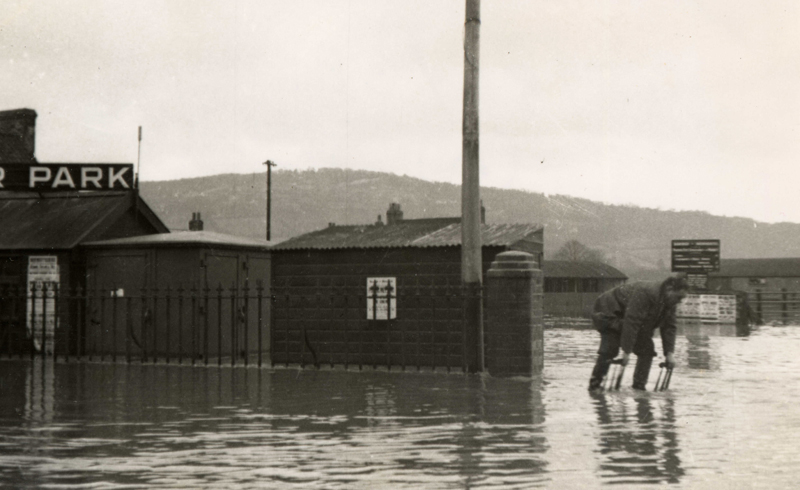
1947 flood in Monnow Street

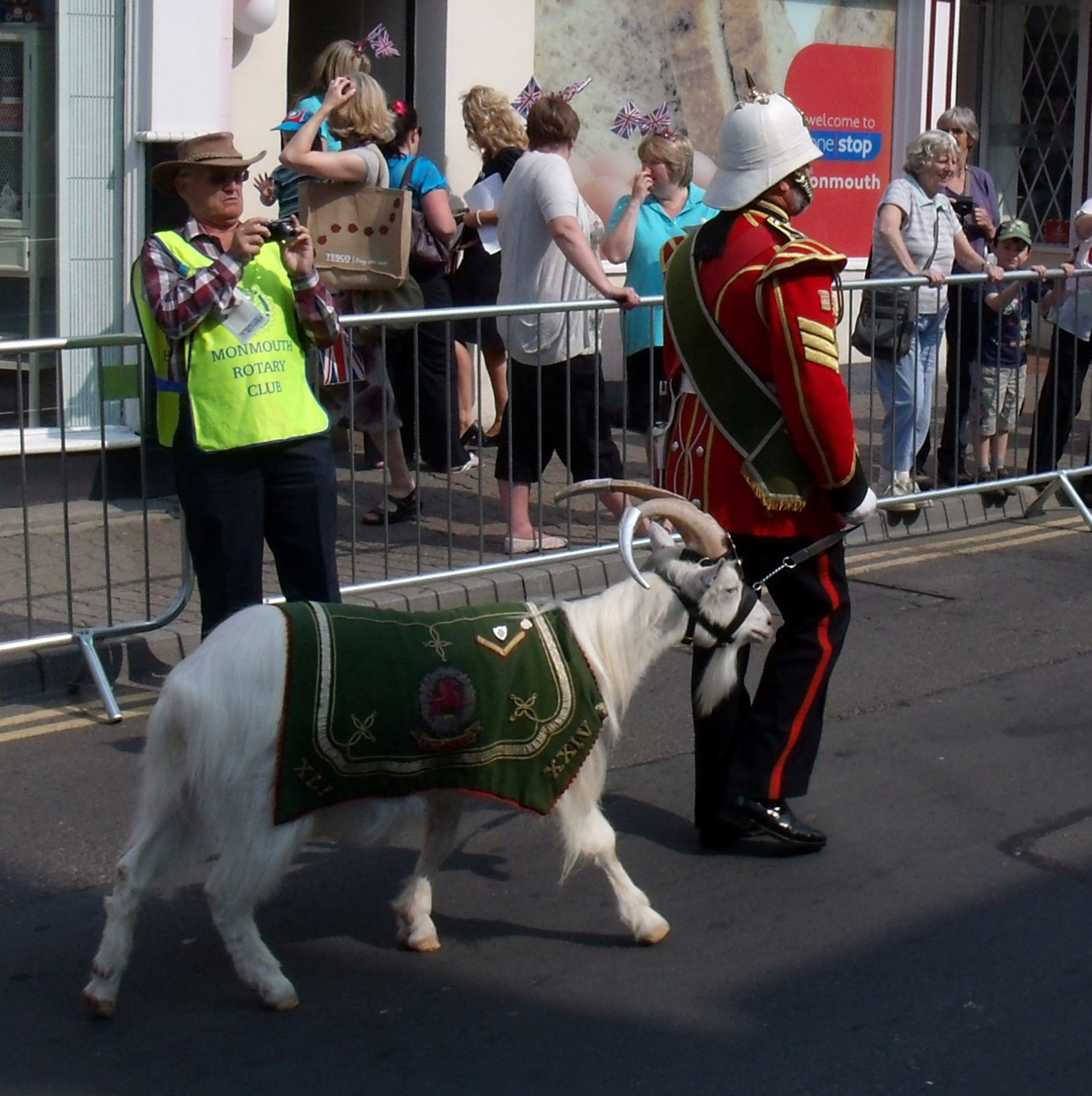
Goat Master with mascot in Monnow Street during the Olympic torch procession in 2012
