= Monmouth Women's Festival =

Women's festival in Monmouth, Wales

- Frequency: Annual
- Locations: Monmouth, Wales
- Years active: Since 2004
- Website: www.monmouthwomensfestival.com

Monmouth Women's Festival is an annual event in Monmouth, Wales, focusing on issues of interest to women. It is a not-for-profit cultural festival including workshops, talks and other events, and is organised by a small committee of volunteers.

The 2012 festival, the ninth in the event's history, took place between 2–18 March. Guest speakers included Julia Donaldson, Erin Pizzey and Jennie Bond.

To mark International Women's Day in Monmouth through the organising of the events for the community, by raising awareness of the issues facing women both locally, internationally and across all races and cultures, and by celebrating women’s achievements.

== Festival venues, 2012 ==
- Church of St Thomas the Martyr, Monmouth
- Drybridge House, Monmouth
- The Grange, Monmouth
- Haberdashers' Monmouth School for Girls
- Moco's Restaurant
- Monmouth Museum
- Monmouth School
- Monmouth School Sports Club
- Ancre Hill Estates, Monnow Valley Vineyard
- 1 Monk Street, Monmouth
- Monmouth Priory
- The Rolls Hall, Monmouth
- Rossiter Books
- Savoy Theatre, Monmouth
- Shire Hall, Monmouth
- St Mary's Roman Catholic Church, Monmouth
