= Cornwall House =

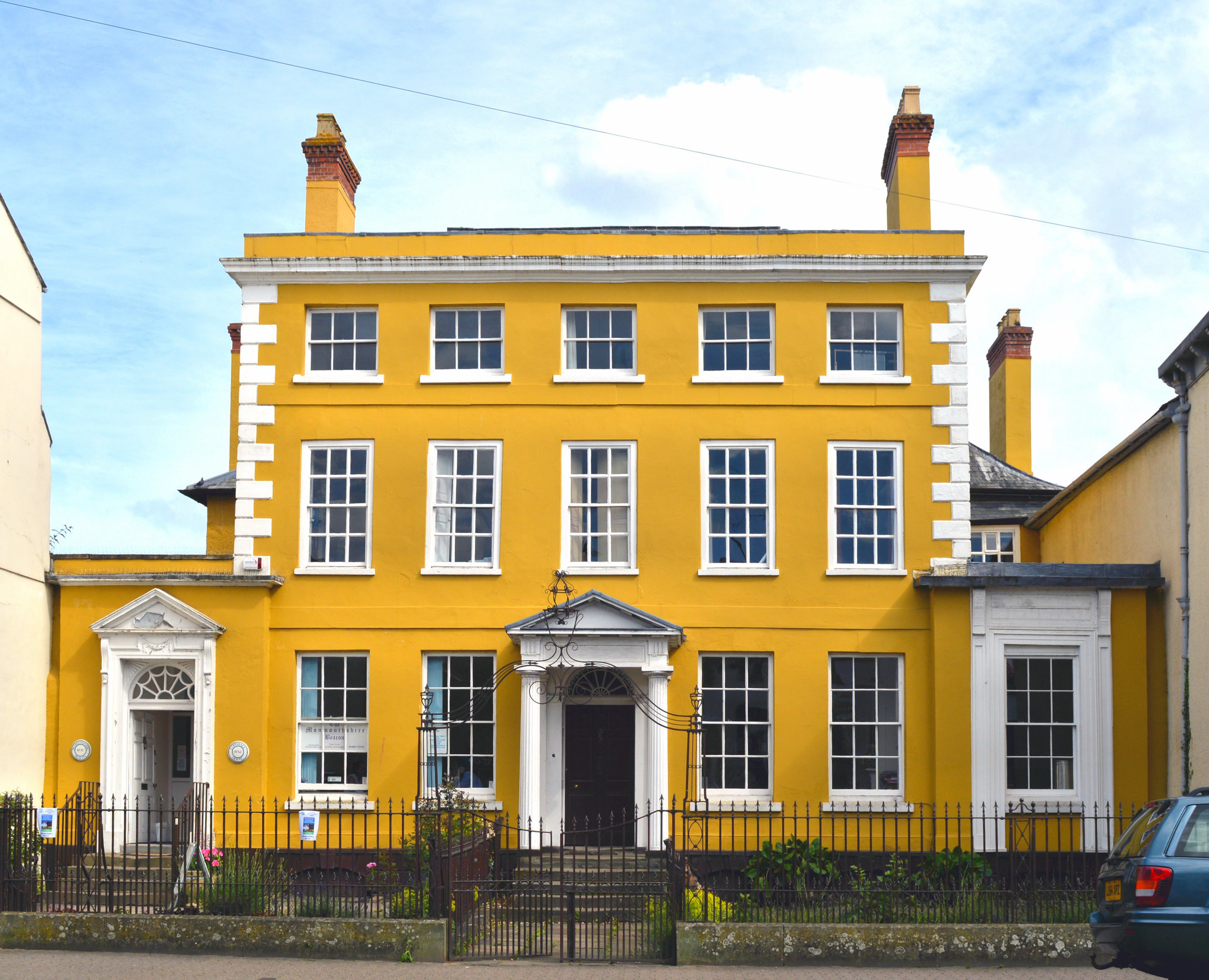
- "the most imposing house in the street"

- Location within Monmouthshire
- 51.81065°N 2.7175°W
- Location: 56–58 Monnow Street, Monmouth

History
- Original structure built: 17th century

Listed Building – Grade II*
- Official name: Cornwall House
- Designated: 27 June 1952
- Reference no.: 85142

Listed Building – Grade II*
- Official name: Front Garden Railings & Gates to Nos.56 & 58 (Cornwall House)
- Designated: 15 August 1974
- Reference no.: 2293

Cornwall House is a town house located at numbers 56 and 58, Monnow Street in Monmouth, Wales. It dates in part from the 17th century but was rebuilt in several stages later. The street facade and rear facade are very different, but both are reworkings of a much older building. It is a Grade II* listed building, and has been described in The Buildings of Wales as "the most imposing house in the street". Part has been the main office of the Monmouthshire Beacon newspaper since 1987.

== History and architecture ==
The house was constructed in several stages, and occupies the sites of at least three burgages. In 1678 it was known as the Great House and was owned by George Milborne, brother of the recusant George Milborne of Wonastow; in 1699 it was owned by Thomas Brewer, blacksmith. The Duke of Beaufort's agent, Henry Burgh, acquired it and was responsible for building the Queen Anne style frontage facing the fields at Chippenham – at the rear of the building as it now appears.

=== Exterior ===
What is now the rear of the building has a whitewashed stone dressing that covers the main red brick construction. It has two-plus-three-plus-two bays, with the central three under a pediment enclosing Diocletian windows and with a rusticated surround. There is a simple but elegant early nineteenth century staircase, and an Adamesque chimney piece with nicely carved timber. A plaque on the outside gives the date of that part of the building as 1752. The secluded walled garden, which the rear of the current building now overlooks, originally contained a grandstand from which the Duke and his friends could watch horse racing on Chippenham fields.

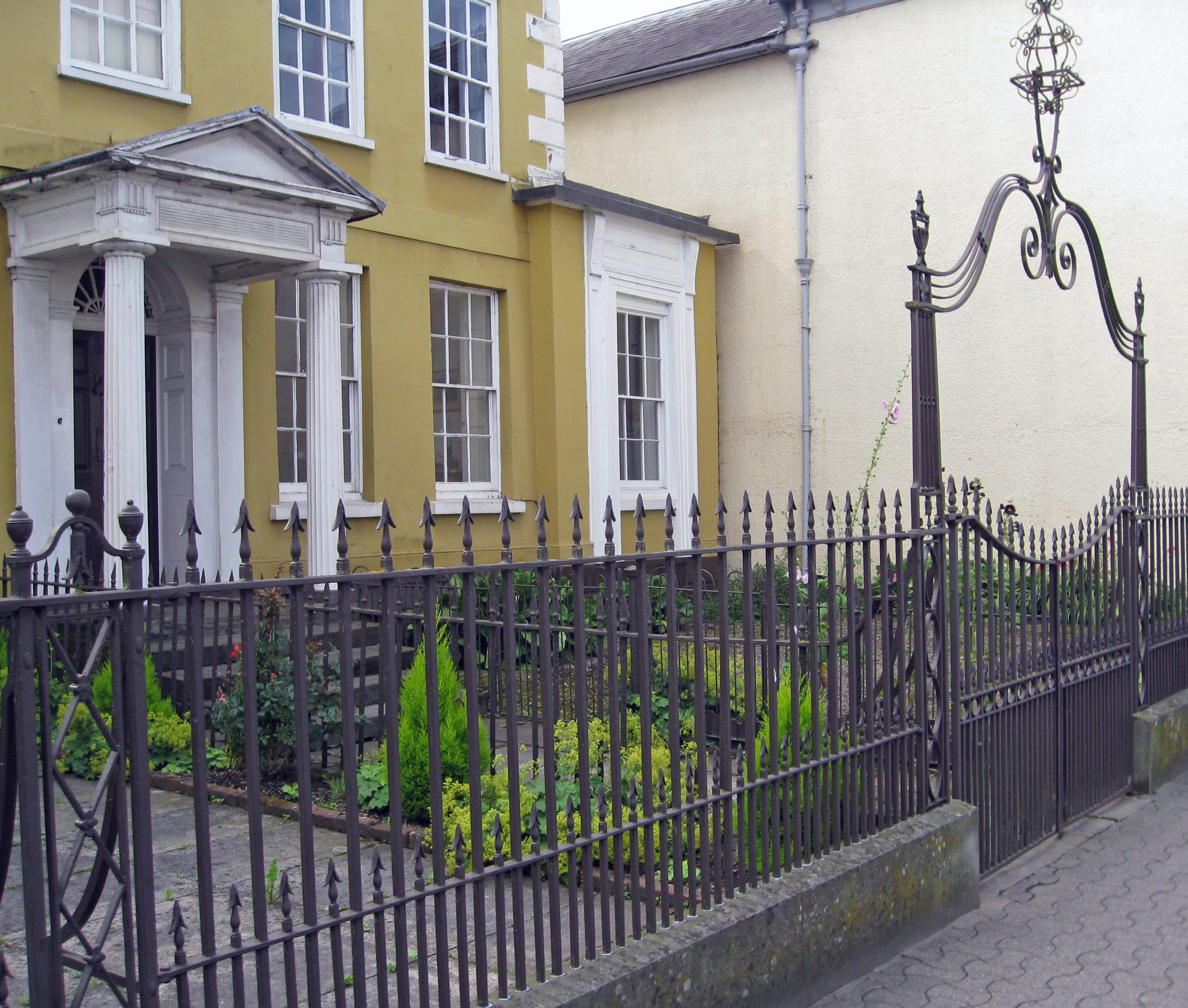
Cornwall House lampholder and fence

The building now faces Monnow Street. The façade that looks onto the street is Georgian and shows two floors and an attic, with the building being set behind a railed forecourt. The new frontage was added in 1770, and (slightly later) a porch, fanlights and side doors were added in the late 18th century. The house now has five bays, under a cornice and pedimented porch on slender Doric columns.

At some point in the 19th century the house was split into two parts, and the spaces between the house and the neighbouring buildings was filled by two single storey extensions. The one on the left provides access to number 56, which is now the office of the Monmouthshire Beacon newspaper, while the one on the right provides a kitchen to number 58. The street entrance to number 58 retains an elegant lampholder over the gate in the ironwork front fence.

=== Interior ===
Inside the building, the original staircases are still extant, and there is "an Adamesque chimneypiece of timber carved with exquisite delicacy".

== Current uses and status ==
A plaque on the front of the building, dated 1837, refers to the Monmouthshire Beacon, a newspaper founded that year. The newspaper moved into the building in 1987, its 150th anniversary year, when Princess Margaret opened its new offices. Number 58, the main part of the house, is privately owned but is regularly open to the public during selected weekends from March to September.

The building was declared a Grade II* listed building in 1952.
