= Monmouthshire Beacon =

Weekly tabloid newspaper founded in 1837

The Monmouthshire Beacon
- The 18 January 2012 front page
- Type: Weekly newspaper
- Format: Tabloid
- Owner: Yattendon Group / Fowler family
- Editor: Marcus Law
- Founded: 14 October 1837; 188 years ago
- Language: English
- Headquarters: Monmouth
- Circulation: 1,928 (as of 2023)
- Sister newspapers: Ross Gazette
- Website: monmouthshirebeacon.co.uk

The Monmouthshire Beacon is a weekly tabloid newspaper covering the areas of Monmouthshire, south Herefordshire and western Gloucestershire. It has been in continuous publication since 1837. In 1980 the newspaper was acquired by the Tindle Newspaper Group of local newspapers owned by Farnham Castle Newspapers and chaired by Sir Ray Tindle (1926–2022). In March 2026, the Beacon, along with all of the other local newspapers owned by Tindle, were sold to a consortium, a joint venture by the Iliffe Media Group and the Fowler family.

The newspaper's editorial office is at Cornwall House, Monnow Street, Monmouth. The Beacon is published every Wednesday. Its sister paper, the Ross Gazette, covers nearby south Herefordshire.

== History ==
The first issue was published on 14 October 1837, priced at 4½d (1.9p). It was printed by Thomas Farror at Castle Hill, Monmouth, and published by him at Agincourt Square. The first editor was Richard Ramsey Dinnis (assisted by the Rev. George Roberts). This paper had to compete with the Monmouthshire Merlin which had started publication eight years earlier. The Merlin had been started by Charles Hough in 1829, but it had bankrupted him by 1831 and it was his co-owner Reginald James Blewitt who eventually built the Merlin to have the largest newspaper circulation in Wales by 1854. The Beacon's attacks on R.J.Blewiit were so strong that the Merthyr paper disagreed with the Beacon despite their shared politics. The Beacon was backed by the Ironmaster Sir Joseph Bailey Bt. and local conservatives. It was said that the Beacon's circulation was only just over 500 and was thought to run at a loss, with copies being given away.

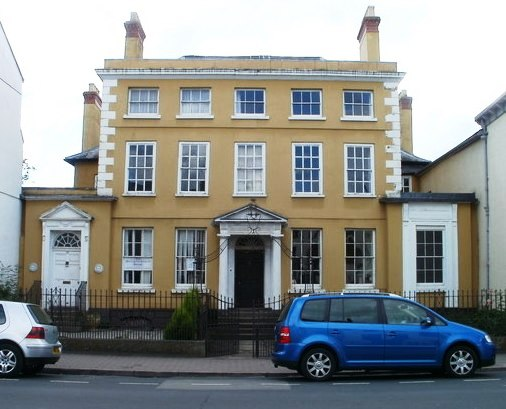
Cornwall House, where the editorial offices are located today

In 1840, the Beacon produced a 200-page special report on the trial of the Chartist leaders in the Shire Hall. A similar issue was published by the Monmouthshire Merlin but they took different lines. The Merlin defended the Whig government whilst the Beacon blamed it for an uprising that had led to the ring-leaders being sentenced to death. Although the Beacon did not support the uprising and realised that those involved were obliged to "be dealt with as enemies and aliens". In 1840 there was also a Monmouthshire Advertiser but this was absorbed into the Monmouthshire Beacon and Advertiser by 1850. Around 1840, John Dix claimed to have been editor of this paper but supporting evidence is not available.

The Beacon's printing works and offices moved to the new Market Hall in Priory Street in 1876. In 1963, the newspaper's offices and print works were completely destroyed, together with much of the building itself, when a fire started in its paper store. Its offices then moved to 50 Monnow Street, and in 1987 moved again to Cornwall House, where the new offices were opened during the newspaper's 150th anniversary year by Princess Margaret.

In March 2026, Tindle Newspaper Group sold the entirety of its holding of local newspapers, including the Beacon, to a consortium, a joint venture by the Iliffe Media Group and the Fowler family.
