= Blestium =

- Blestio
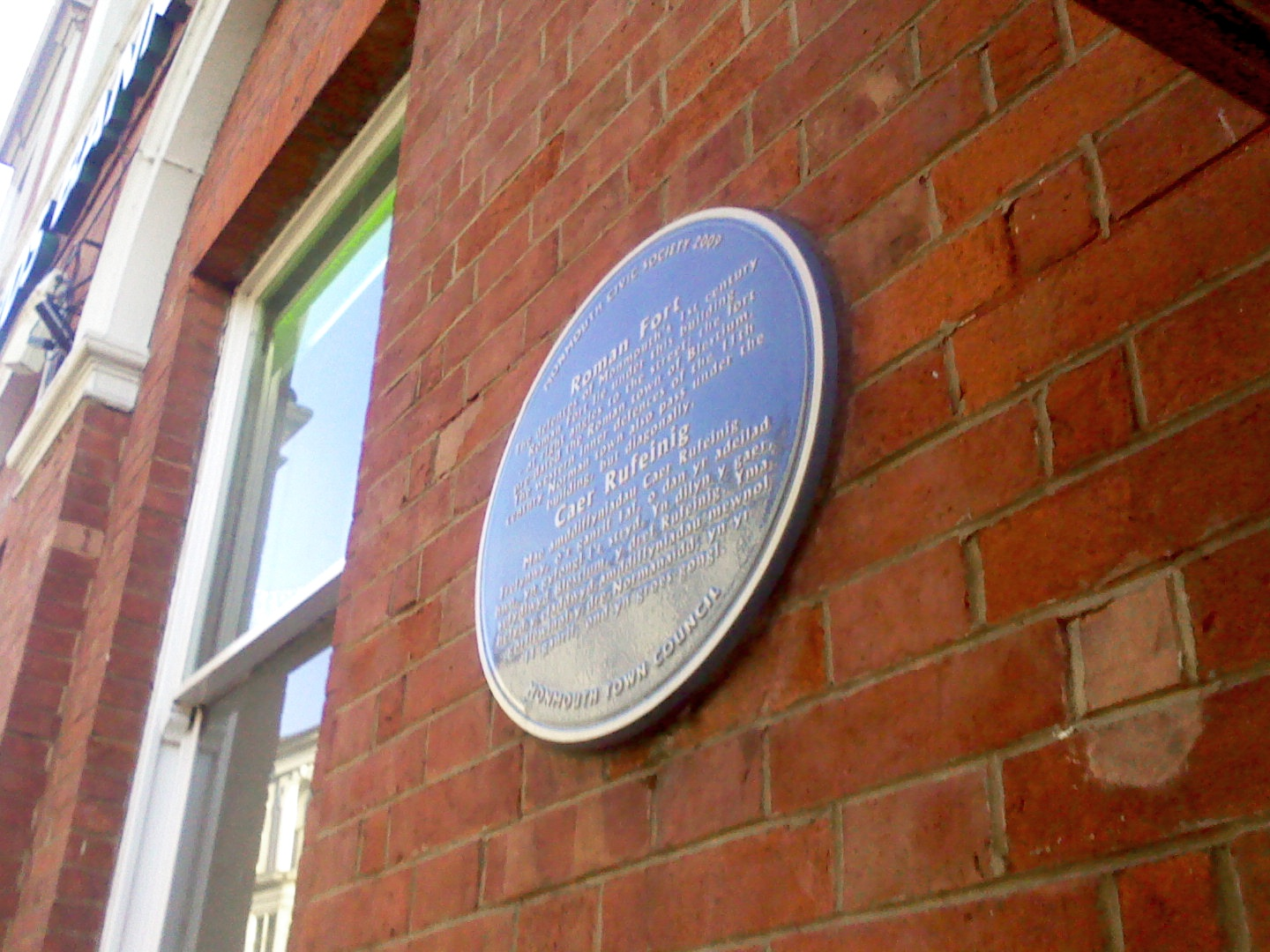
- A plaque on Lloyds TSB records the fort's position.

- Location within Wales
- 51°48′32″N 02°43′01″W
- Type: Settlement
- Periods: Roman Imperial
- Location: Monmouth, Monmouthshire, Wales, United Kingdom
- Region: Britannia Superior

History
- Built: Possibly before 55 AD
- Built by: Publius Ostorius Scapula or Aulus Didius Gallus

Blestium (also Blestio in the Antonine Itinerary (Iter XIII)) was a small fort and iron working centre in the Roman province of Britannia Superior, part of Roman Britain. It has been identified with the site of the later town of Monmouth in south east Wales, located adjoining the confluence of the River Monnow with the River Wye. A plaque on a bank building in Munnow Street records its position.

== History and remains ==
The reference to Blestio in the Antonine Itinerary is the only one made to the settlement in Roman sources. It was located on the road between Caerleon (Isca Silurum) and Silchester (Calleva Atrebatum), midway between the fort at Usk (Burrium) and the iron making centre at Ariconium, believed to be at Weston under Penyard near Ross-on-Wye. It is suggested that the name may derive from the Greek word βλαστος, meaning "offshoot".

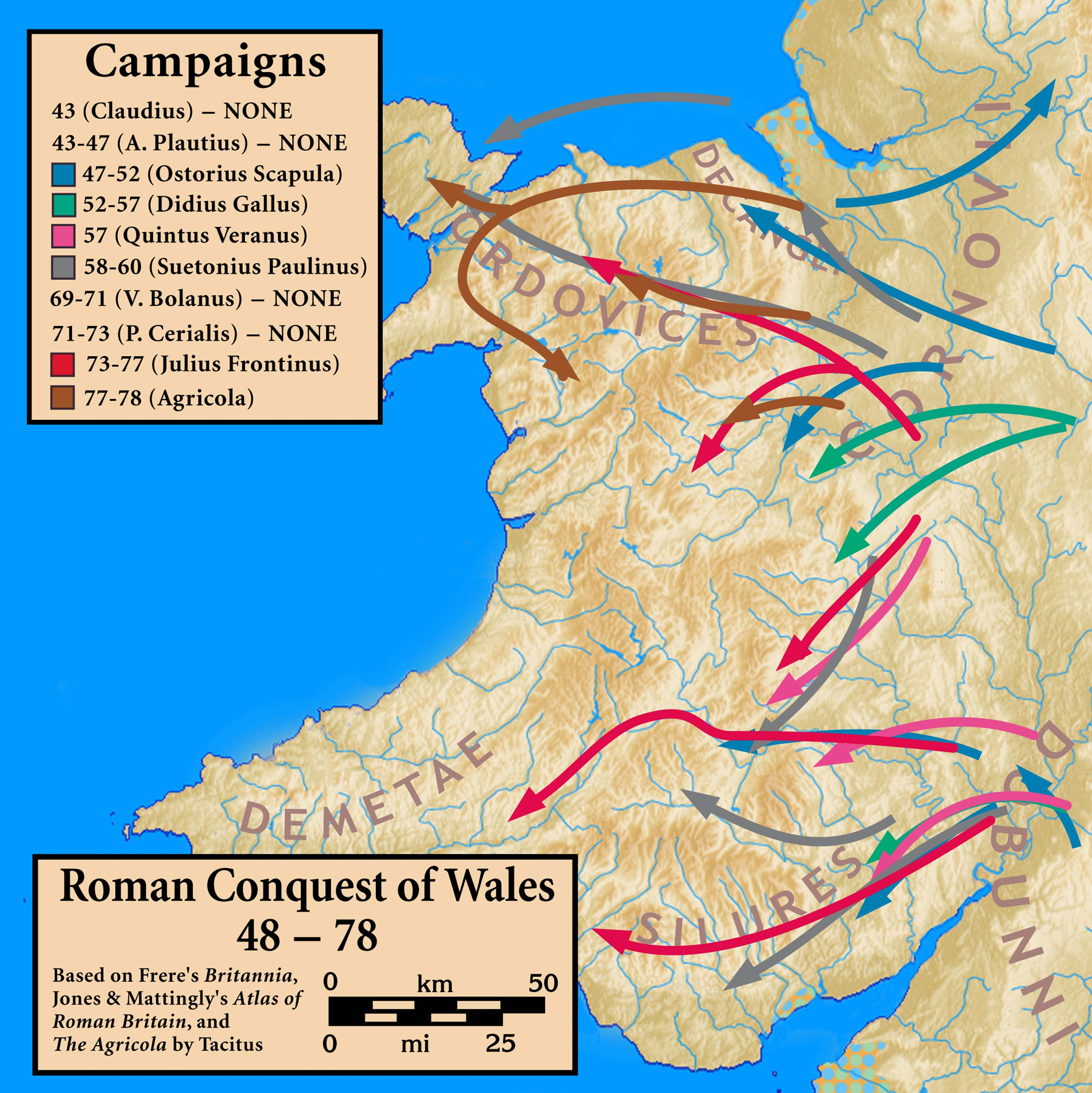
Map showing the main campaigns in the Roman conquest of Wales. Blestium occupied a key location in the south-east of the area covered.

It is now generally accepted that a Neronian or pre-Flavian military fort was established at Monmouth, perhaps before 55 AD, making it the earliest Roman fort in Wales. The fort was probably established, either by Publius Ostorius Scapula or his successor Aulus Didius Gallus, during the first advances of the Romans against the Silures of south east Wales. The invading forces established a series of auxiliary forts along the Monnow valley into mid Wales, as well as advancing towards Usk where they established the fort of Burrium. The Silures fought a successful guerrilla war against the Romans for some thirty years before being defeated by the forces led by Sextus Julius Frontinus. The fort at Blestium is believed to have housed around 2,000 soldiers during the initial campaign, and later to have remained as a small fortlet.

Relatively few Roman remains had been found at Monmouth until recently. The first ditch of the fort was discovered in 2007 by the Monmouth Archaeological Society behind properties on Monnow Street, within Monmouth town centre. Excavations in 2010 in Agincourt Square also uncovered pottery and bones, which appear to confirm the existence of a fort. There is substantial evidence of iron working dating from the Roman period, drawing on local iron ore and charcoal for smelting from local forests. This includes hearths and waste slag, both in the town centre and in the Overmonnow area. Stone buildings associated with 2nd and 3rd century iron working have been excavated near the crossing of the River Monnow. Coins found in the town date mainly from the third and fourth centuries, suggesting continuing civilian settlement.

== Monmouth Heritage Trail ==
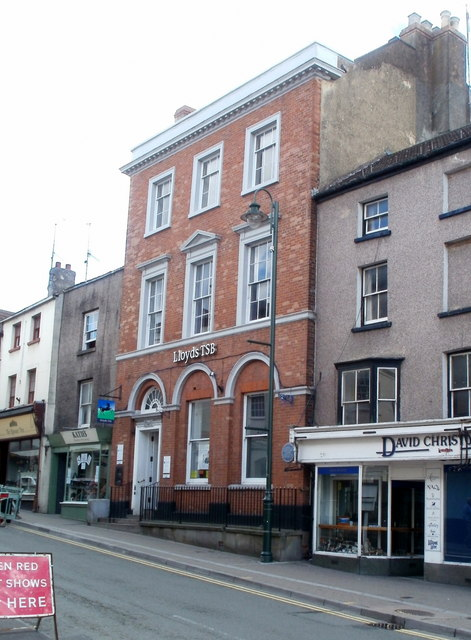
Lloyds TSB bank, Monnow Street

The Monmouth Heritage Trail includes a blue plaque recording the Roman fort of Blestium. This is attached to 18 Monnow Street, a late 18th-century town house. The building is Grade II listed, and, as the plaque indicates, it was built over the remains of Blestium. However, the Roman site itself does not have a heritage listing.

== See also ==
- Wales in the Roman Era

== Bibliography ==
- Arnold, Christopher J; Davies, Jeffrey L (2000). Roman & Early Medieval Wales. Stroud: Sutton Publishing.
