= The Kymin =

Hill with follies in Wales

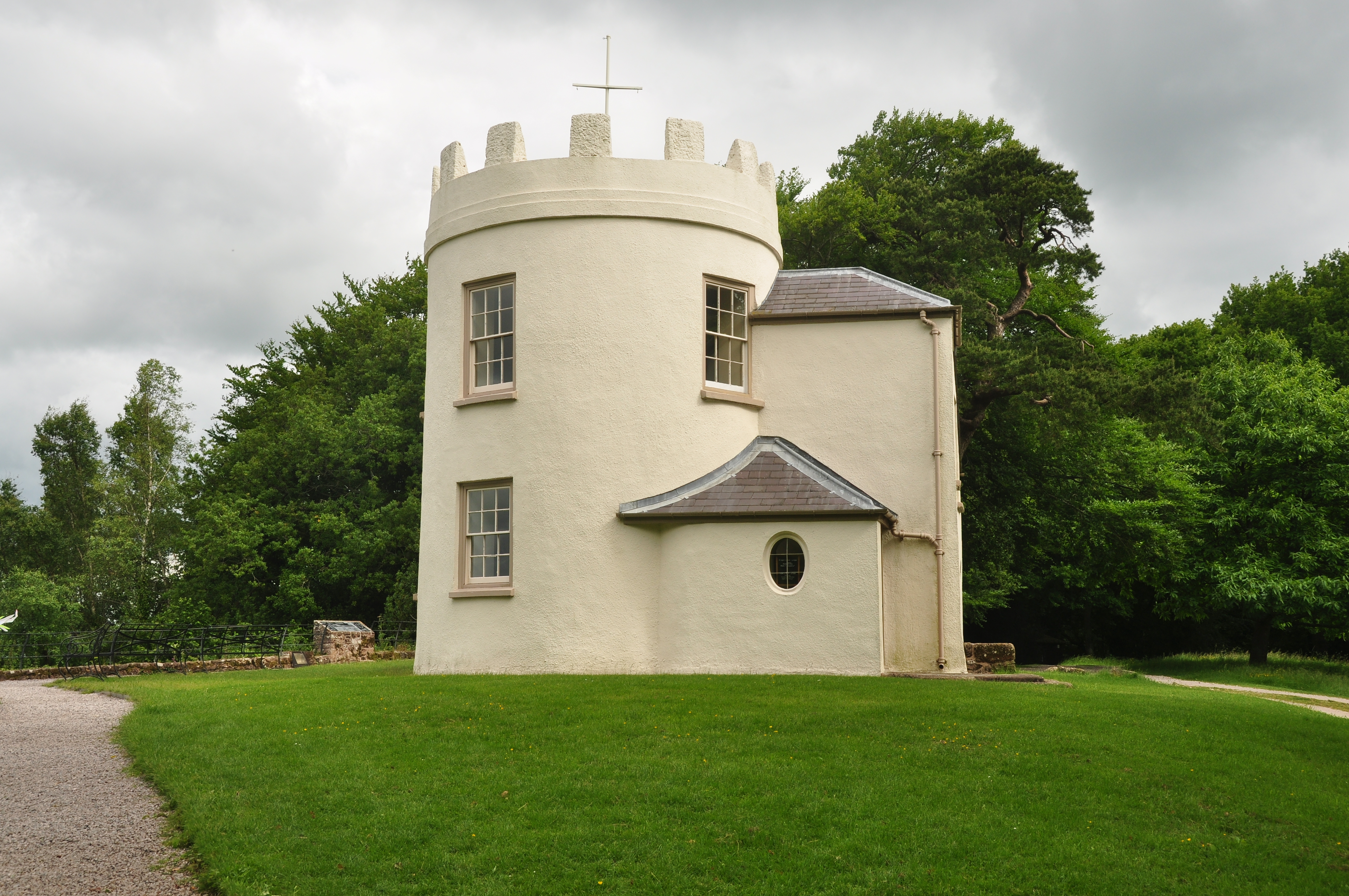
- The Round House at the Kymin, Monmouth, Wales

Highest point
- Elevation: 256 m (840 ft)
- Prominence: 86 m (282 ft)
- Coordinates: 51°48′35″N 2°41′16″W

Geography
- Location within Wales
- Location: Monmouth, Wales

Listed Building – Grade II*
- Official name: The Kymin Roundhouse
- Designated: 27 June 1952
- Reference no.: 2222

Listed Building – Grade II
- Official name: The Naval Temple with surrounding wall
- Designated: 27 June 1952
- Reference no.: 2221

Cadw/ICOMOS Register of Parks and Gardens of Special Historic Interest in Wales
- Official name: The Kymin
- Designated: 1 February 2022
- Reference no.: PGW(Gt)5(MON)
- Listing: Grade II

The Kymin (Welsh: Cae-y-Maen), is a hill overlooking Monmouth, in Monmouthshire, Wales. It is located approximately one mile east of Monmouth, on the eastern side of the River Wye and adjacent to the border with the Forest of Dean and England. The summit of the hill, about 800 feet above sea level, is known for its neo-classical monuments, the Roundhouse and the Naval Temple, built between 1794 and 1800. It is registered on the Cadw/ICOMOS Register of Parks and Gardens of Special Historic Interest in Wales. The site is within a designated Area of Outstanding Natural Beauty (AONB) and is owned by the National Trust.

== The Roundhouse ==
=== History ===
The Roundhouse was built by members of the Monmouth Picnic Club or Kymin Club, a group of Monmouth's gentlemen, led by Philip Meakins Hardwick. The members of the Kymin Club were drawn from "the principal Gentlemen of Monmouth and its vicinity", and met each week "for the purpose of dining together, and spending the day in a social and friendly manner". The Roundhouse was constructed to provide "security from the inclemency of the weather" and the subscription list for funding was headed by the local landowner, Henry Somerset, 5th Duke of Beaufort, and eight Members of Parliament. Construction began in 1794, and the local author and artist Fred Hando records that the building "was completed within two years". The building was sited to take advantage of the views and the Monmouth antiquarian and publisher Charles Heath recorded in his 1807 history; Descriptive Account of the Kymin Pavilion and Beaulieu Grove with their various views; also a description of the Naval Temple that ten counties could be seen from the Roundhouse; (Gloucestershire, Monmouthshire, Glamorganshire, Breconshire, Montgomeryshire, Worcestershire, Herefordshire, Radnorshire, Shropshire and Somerset). A telescope by Peter Dollond was fitted in the upper room and Heath detailed a large number of the sights that could be viewed from the five windows.

=== Architecture and description ===
The Roundhouse is a white round tower, in two storeys with a crenellated roof, similar to a folly. The club members wanted a venue suitable for their regular meetings, dining and events and the building was designed with kitchens on the ground floor and a banqueting room above. The building was restored in the early 20th century, when it ceased to be used as a residence. It is a Grade II* listed building as of 27 June 1952.

== The Naval Temple ==
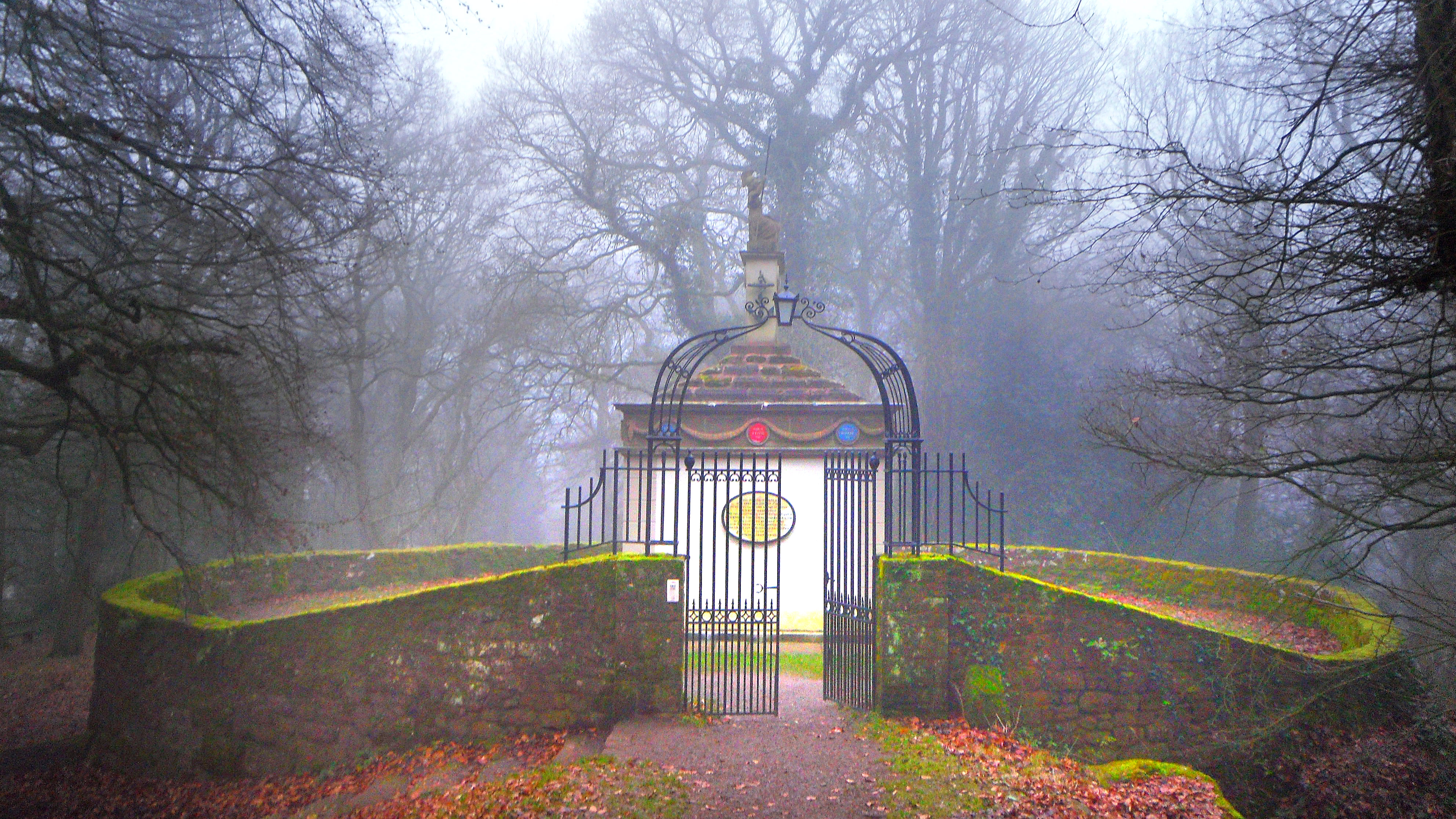
The Naval Temple - In honour of sixteen admirals

=== History ===
The Naval Temple was constructed by the Kymin Club in 1800 to commemorate the second anniversary of the British naval victory at the Battle of the Nile in 1798 and in recognition of sixteen of the British Royal Navy's Admirals who had delivered significant victories in other major sea battles of the age around the globe to that date. The temple was dedicated by Elizabeth Somerset, Duchess of Beaufort, the daughter of Admiral Edward Boscawen, one of those commemorated in the building. Nelson visited Monmouth in 1802, along with Lady Hamilton and her husband, Sir William Hamilton. They travelled on the River Wye from Ross-on-Wye to Monmouth, to be greeted by a cannonade and the band of the Monmouthshire Militia playing See, the Conquering Hero Comes. Staying in Monmouth for just a couple of days, Nelson visited the Naval Temple and the Roundhouse on Kymin Hill, where he breakfasted and admired the views. He was struck with the Naval Temple, saying that "it was the only monument of its kind erected to the Royal Navy in the Kingdom".

Sir Richard Hoare, 2nd Baronet saw the temple in 1803, soon after its construction, and was unimpressed, describing it as "in very bad taste". Monmouthshire artist and author, Fred Hando, who described many Monmouthshire landmarks in his series of articles for the South Wales Argus running from 1922-1970, visited the temple in 1964. At that time, the figure of Britannia had been lost, as had the two naval seascape paintings depicting The Battle of the Nile and The Standard of Great Britain Triumphant.

The temple has been restored on a number of occasions, most recently in 2012, following storm damage. The latest restoration saw the reinstatement of the statue of Britannia, the re-painting of the two seascapes and the re-installation of the gates.

The building of the temple, in a small county town in Wales, far from the sea and with no great naval or seafaring traditions, was surprising. The historian Peter Borsay suggests that the monument's design, and its location overlooking the border between England and Wales, were intended symbols of the formation of Great Britain. It was built at the time of the Act of Union with Ireland, about a century after that with Scotland, and at a time when the United Kingdom was engaged in a war with France which was helping to define, and being used to define, what it was to be British.

Up until 1797 Britannia was conventionally depicted holding a spear, but as a consequence of the increasingly prominent role of the navy in the war against the French, and of several spectacular victories, the spear was replaced by a trident. It is this that the Kymin Britannia wields. The navy had come to be seen... as the very bulwark of British liberty and the essence of what it was to be British... It was therefore entirely appropriate that the temple should be a naval one, that the heroes celebrated should all be naval officers, and that battles commemorated ones fought at sea." In building the temple, Monmouth staked its own claim to be the centre of British identity as the birthplace of King Henry V, of whom a statue was placed on the Shire Hall in 1792. Within two years of the battle of Waterloo in 1815 the name of the town's market place had been changed to Agincourt Square "in order to celebrate a victory of Henry V's that seemed as famous as Wellington's. Source: New approaches to social history: Myth, memory and place - Monmouth and Bath 1750-1900

=== Architecture and description ===
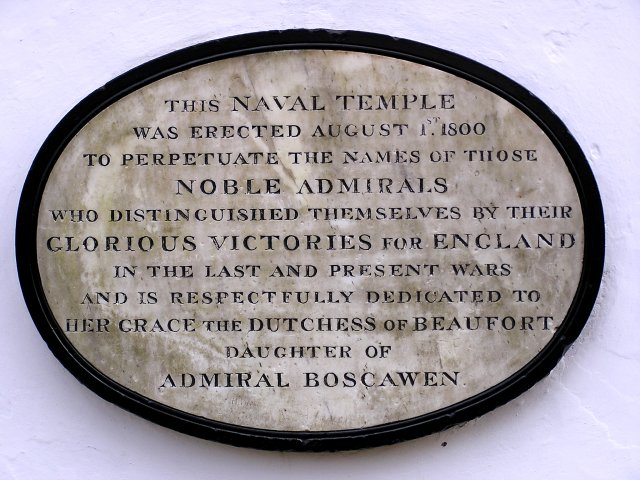
The plaque reads: This Naval Temple was erected August 1st, 1800 to perpetuate the names of those noble admirals who distinguished themselves by their glorious victories for England in the last and present wars and respectfully dedicated to her grace the Dutchess of Beaufort daughter of Admiral Boscawan

The memorial is classical in design, topped by a bronze seated figure of Britannia (now a replica). It comprises two porticos, back to back, with Doric columns. The architect is unknown but two preliminary designs, dated 1798 and signed by a T. Fidler, are held at the National Library of Wales. The architectural historian John Newman describes the architectural style as; "hard(..) to come to terms with". The temple is a Grade II listed building.

The square Naval Temple has round plaques or medallions, four on each face, for each Admiral and the victory with which he was most closely associated and its date. The named Admirals are:

- Vice Admiral Charles Thompson
- Rear Admiral Adam Duncan, 1st Viscount Duncan of Camperdown
- Vice Admiral Edward Boscawen
- Admiral Samuel Hood, 1st Viscount Hood
- Admiral Richard Howe, 1st Earl Howe
- Admiral John Warren
- Admiral John Gell (was retired locally near Crickhowell when this was built.)
- Admiral Horatio Nelson, 1st Viscount Nelson
- Admiral of the Fleet John Jervis, 1st Earl of St Vincent
- Vice Admiral George Rodney, 1st Baron Rodney
- Admiral Edward Hawke, 1st Baron Hawke who was also First Lord of the Admiralty
- Vice Admiral Alexander Hood, 1st Viscount Bridport
- Vice Admiral William Cornwallis
- Admiral Sir Hyde Parker
- Admiral George Elphinstone, 1st Viscount Keith
- Admiral Andrew Mitchell

== Today ==
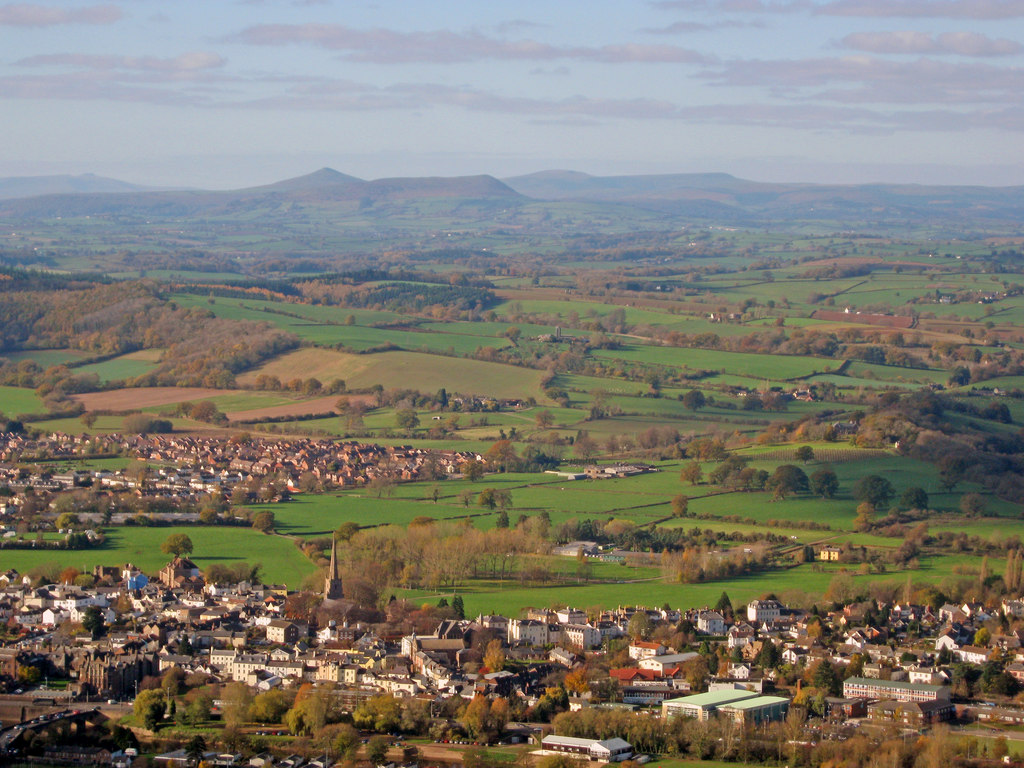
Autumn view from the Kymin

The Kymin is accessed by a winding road climbing up off the A4136 Monmouth to Forest of Dean road. The area is managed and conserved by the National Trust and there is a car park near the summit with an easy walk to both the Temple and the Roundhouse. The latter has now been converted to a holiday cottage. The views on a clear day have been described as magnificent. The site is listed at Grade II on the Cadw/ICOMOS Register of Parks and Gardens of Special Historic Interest in Wales.

The landscape features incorporated within the woodland at Beaulieu Grove were apparently destroyed early in the 19th century. The Woodland Trust is undertaking research into the history of the area, and provides access to the woods.

=== Kymin Dash ===
The Kymin Dash is a cross country running hill race held annually. The course covers about 7 miles, circling the town and both ascending and descending the Kymin by forest tracks, field paths and minor roads. The previous course record of 39m 50s was set by Huw Evans, a teacher from Monmouth, in 2015. The record held until 2025, when it was broken by Henry Evans, Huw's son, in a time of 39m 25s.

== Sources ==
- Borsay, Peter (Spring 2006). "New approaches to social history: Myth, memory and place - Monmouth and Bath 1750-1900". Journal of Social History. 39 (3): 867–889.
- Hando, Fred (1964). Monmouth Town Sketch Book. Newport: R.H.Johns Ltd. OCLC 30295655.
- Headley, Gwyn; Meulenkamp, Wim (1999). Follies, Grottoes and Garden Buildings. London: Aurum Press. ISBN 9781854106254. OCLC 1008038820.
- Heath, Charles (1807). Descriptive Account of the Kymin Pavilion and Beaulieu Grove with their various views; also a description of the Naval Temple. Monmouth: Charles Heath. OCLC 84200287.
- Kissack, Keith (1975). Monmouth: The Making of a County Town. Chichester: Phillimore. ISBN 9780850332094. OCLC 255539468.
- Newman, John (2000). Gwent/Monmouthshire. The Buildings of Wales. London: Penguin. ISBN 978-0-300-09630-9.
