= Peter Borsay =

British historian (1950–2020)

Peter N. Borsay (1950-2020) was a professor of history at Aberystwyth University. He was a specialist in the social, urban and cultural history of Britain.

== Selected publications ==
- The English urban renaissance: Culture and society in the provincial town 1660-1770. Clarendon Press, Oxford, 1991. ISBN 9780198202554
- Provincial towns in early modern England and Ireland: Change, convergence and divergence. Oxford University Press, Oxford, 2002. (Edited with L. Proudfoot) ISBN 978-0197262481
- A history of leisure: The British experience since 1500. Palgrave Macmillan, 2006. ISBN 978-0333930816
- Resorts and ports: European seaside towns since 1700. Channel View Publications, 2011. (Edited with J.K. Walton) ISBN 978-1845411978
- Leisure cultures in urban Europe c. 1700-1870: A transnational perspective. Manchester University Press, Manchester, 2015. (Edited with J.H. Furnee) (Studies in Popular Culture series) ISBN 978-0719089695
- The Invention of the English Landscape, c. 1700-1939. Bloomsbury Academic, 2023. (Posthumous, completed by Prof. Rosemary Sweet) ISBN 978-1350031678
