= Monmouth =

Town in Monmouthshire, Wales

Monmouth: Welsh: Trefynwy
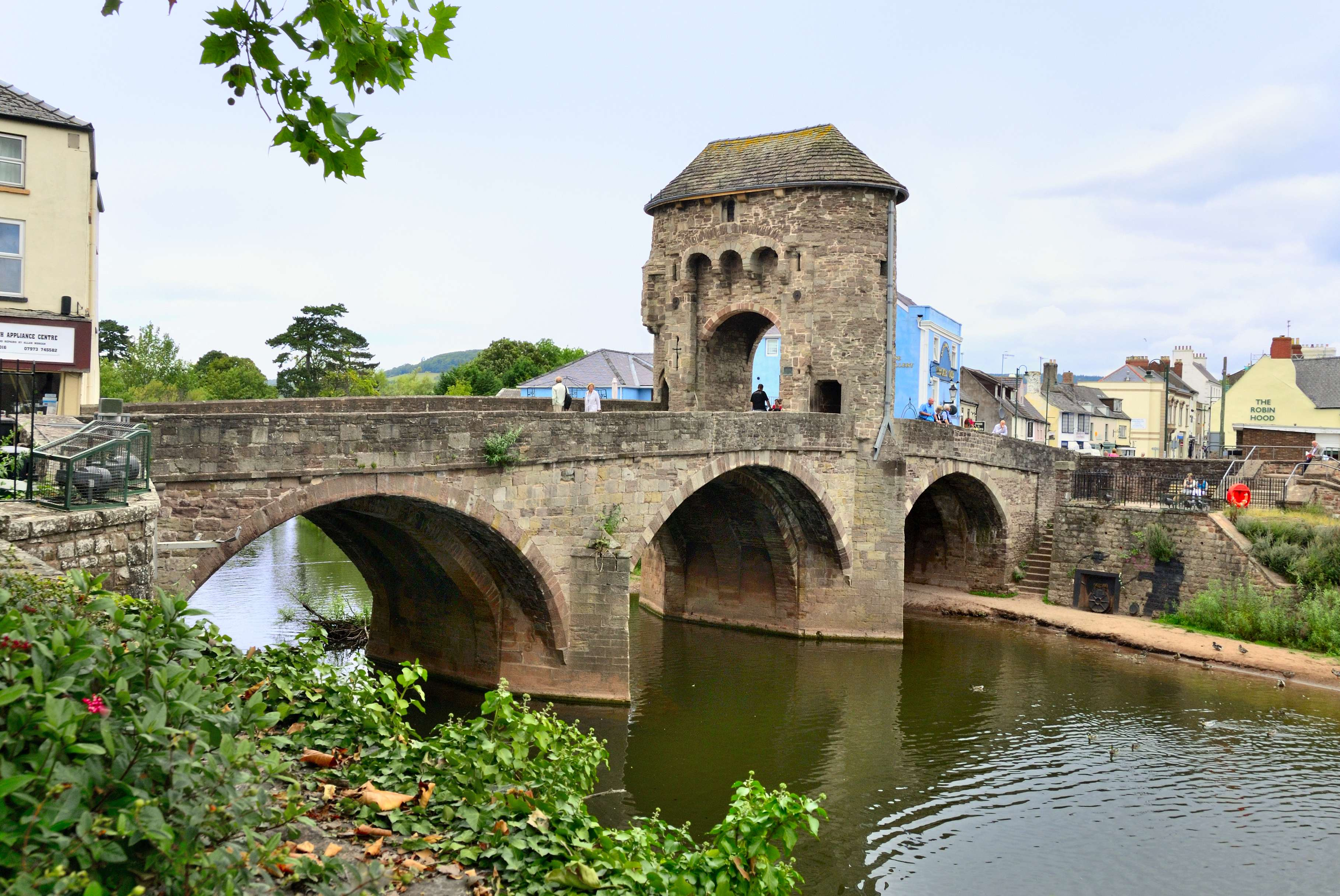
- Monnow Bridge

- Flag

- Location within Monmouthshire
- Population: 10,508 (2011)
- OS grid reference: SO505125
- Principal area: Monmouthshire
- Preserved county: Gwent
- Country: Wales
- Sovereign state: United Kingdom
- Post town: MONMOUTH
- Postcode district: NP25
- Dialling code: 01600
- Police: Gwent
- Fire: South Wales
- Ambulance: Welsh
- UK Parliament: Monmouthshire
- Senedd Cymru – Welsh Parliament: Monmouth
- Website: www.monmouth.gov.uk
- List of places UK Wales Monmouthshire 51.81°N 2.72°W Map of the community

Monmouth (/ˈmɒnməθ/ MON-məth or /ˈmʌn-/ MUN-; Welsh: Trefynwy, lit. 'Town on the Monnow') is a market town and community in Monmouthshire, Wales, situated on where the River Monnow joins the River Wye, two miles (three kilometres) from the Wales–England border. The population in the 2011 census was 10,508, rising from 8,877 in 2001. Monmouth was the county town of historic Monmouthshire, although Abergavenny is the largest settlement and Monmouthshire County Council has its main offices at Rhadyr, just outside Usk. Monmouth is in the UK Parliament constituency of Monmouthshire and the Senedd constituency of Monmouth.

The town was the site of a small Roman fort, Blestium, and became established after the Normans built Monmouth Castle c. 1067. The medieval stone gated bridge is the only one of its type remaining in Britain. The castle later came into the possession of the House of Lancaster, and was the birthplace of King Henry V in 1386.

== Toponymy ==
The name Monmouth is an English contraction of 'Monnow-mouth'. The Welsh name for the river, Mynwy, which may originally have meant "fast-flowing", was anglicised as Monnow. The town was originally known in Welsh as Abermynwy ("mouth of the Monnow"), replaced by Trefynwy ("Monnow town" – the initial m of Mynwy mutating in Welsh to f, pronounced /v/) by the 1600s.

== History ==
Excavations undertaken by the Monmouth Archaeological Society on sites along Monnow Street have uncovered details of the early history of the town. The Council for British Archaeology has designated Monmouth as one of the top ten towns in Britain for archaeology.

=== Prehistoric ===
Evidence of a Bronze Age boat building community, including three 100-foot-long (30-metre) channels adjoining the site of a now-vanished lake, was discovered in September 2013, during archaeological investigations by the Monmouth Archaeological Society of the Parc Glyndwr housing development site, immediately north-west of the town.

The excavations later revealed the remains of a Neolithic dwelling. The dwelling was constructed on stilts on a human-made island away from the lake shore in water up to 10 ft (3 m) deep. Oak timbers had been "skillfully" cut with stone or flint axes to form stilts, of posts and poles, which "probably" rested on three parallel fully-grown tree 'sleeper beams', up to 3 feet 3 inches (1 m) wide, laid horizontally on the lakebed. Timbers from the structure were radiocarbon dated to 4867 years before present (BP).

=== Roman times ===
The first recorded settlement at Monmouth was the small Roman fort of Blestium, one of a network of military bases established on the frontiers of the Roman occupation. This was connected by road to the larger Roman towns at Glevum (Gloucester) and Isca Augusta (Caerleon). Archaeologists have found Roman pottery and coins within the modern town centre. During the later Roman period, between the 2nd and late 4th centuries, it appears to have been a centre for iron working, using the local iron ores and charcoal also worked at nearby Gobannium (Abergavenny) and Ariconium (near Ross-on-Wye).

=== The Middle Ages ===
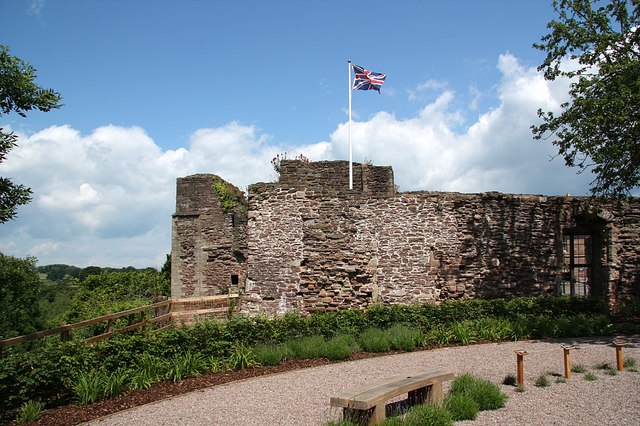
Monmouth Castle, part of which remains in use as a regimental headquarters and museum

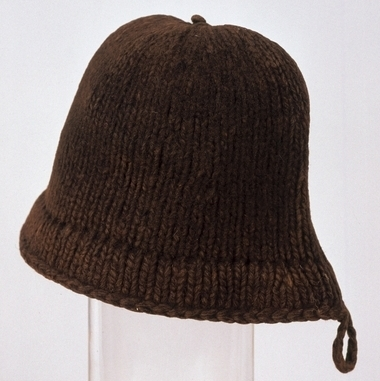
The only known example of an original Monmouth cap, dating from the 16th century, on display at Monmouth Museum

After the end of Roman rule in Britain, the area was at the southern edge of the Welsh kingdom of Ergyng. The only evidence of continuing settlement at Monmouth is a record of a 7th-century church, at an unknown location within the town, dedicated to the Welsh saint Cadoc. In 1056, the area was devastated by the Welsh prince Gruffydd ap Llywelyn, on his way with an army of Welsh, Saxons and Danes to defeat Ralph, Earl of Hereford, and sack the Saxon burh at Hereford, 18 miles (29 km) to the north.

Following the Norman conquest of England in 1066, the Earldom of Hereford was given to William FitzOsbern of Breteuil, Normandy, one of King William's closest allies, who was responsible for defending the area against the Welsh. A new castle was built at Monmouth, holding commanding views over the surrounding area from a sound defensive site and exerting control over both river crossings and the area's important resources of farmland, timber and minerals. Initially it would have been a motte and bailey castle, later rebuilt in stone, and refortified and developed over time. A town grew up around it, and a Benedictine priory was established around 1075 by Withenoc, a Breton who became lord of Monmouth after Roger, the son of William fitzOsbern, was disgraced. The priory may have once been the residence of the monk Geoffrey of Monmouth, who was born around 1100 and is best known for writing the chronicle Historia Regum Britanniae ("History of the Kings of Britain").

The town was recorded in the Domesday Book as part of Herefordshire, and expanded thereafter. There was early burgage development along Monnow Street, and the suburb of Overmonnow, west of the river and protected by a defensive moat called the Clawdd-du or Black ditch, began to develop by the 12th century. Charters from the period refer to the town's trade in iron, and to forges making use of local ore and charcoal. The cinders produced by the forges formed heaps, and were used in building foundations; the name of Cinderhill Street in Overmonnow dates from this period.

During the period of turmoil between the supporters of King Henry III and the barons who sought to curtail his power, the town was the scene of a major battle in 1233, in which the king's forces were routed by the troops of Richard Marshal, Earl of Pembroke. Later, the castle was extended by Henry's son Edmund Crouchback, after he became Earl of Lancaster in 1267. In about 1300, town walls were built, and the Monnow Bridge was fortified. The bridge, now pedestrianised, remains in place, the only such fortified bridge in Britain and reputedly one of only three similar crossings in Europe.

King Edward II was briefly imprisoned at Monmouth Castle in 1326 after being overthrown by his wife Isabella and her lover Roger Mortimer. In the mid 14th century, the castle and town came into the possession of the House of Lancaster through the marriage of John of Gaunt to Blanche of Lancaster. John of Gaunt strengthened the castle, adding the great hall, and the castle became a favourite residence of the House of Lancaster. In 1386, John of Gaunt's grandson was born to Mary de Bohun, in the Queen's Chamber within the gatehouse of Monmouth Castle, while his father Henry Bolingbroke was hunting in the area. The boy was known as Henry of Monmouth before his coronation as Henry V; supported by longbowmen from the area, he won the Battle of Agincourt in 1415. Monmouth's links with Henry are commemorated in the naming of the main town square, Agincourt Square, and in the statue of Henry on the front of the Shire Hall.

From the 14th century onwards, the town became noted for the production of woollen Monmouth caps. The hill of Craig-y-dorth, 1 mile south-west of Monmouth, was the site of a battle in 1404 between Owain Glyndŵr's army and English forces. According to the Annals of Owain Glyn Dwr, "There the English were killed for the most part and they were pursued up to the gates of the town" (of Monmouth). Monmouth, as a border town and administrative centre, suffered after nearby areas, including Usk and Grosmont, were devastated through attacks by supporters of Owain Glyndŵr after the battle and during 1405.

=== Post-medieval times ===
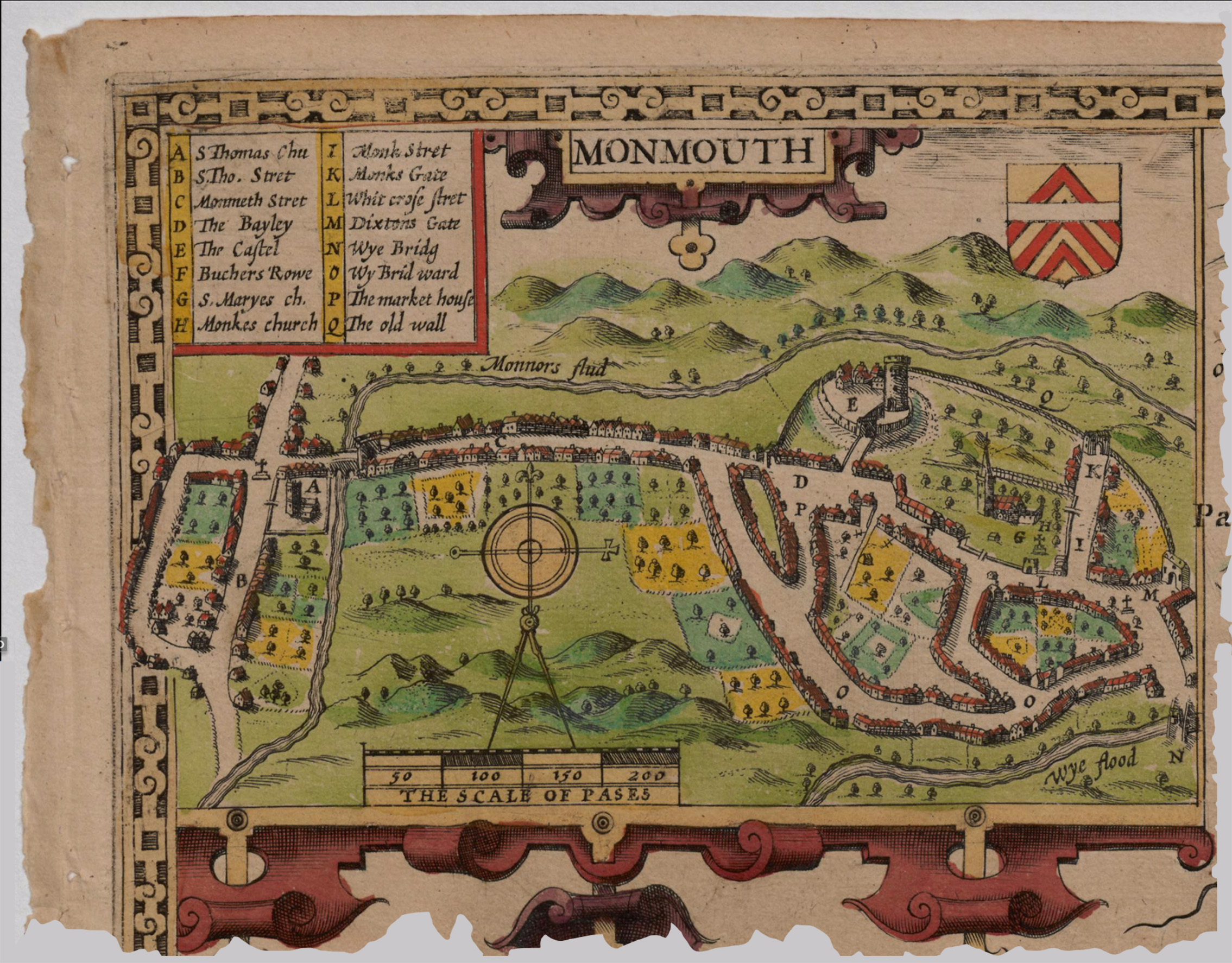
1610 Map of Monmouth by John Speed, roll over the image to link to the places shown.

In 1536, Henry VIII imposed the Laws in Wales Acts 1535–1542, abolishing the powers of the Marcher Lords and integrating the administration of England and Wales. Monmouth became the county town of Monmouthshire. Thereafter until the local government reorganization of 1973, the town and county had ambiguous status; regarded by some as Welsh, by others as English.

The town gained representation in the English Parliament at the same time, and its priory was dissolved. In 1605, James I granted Monmouth a town charter by letters patent. The granting of the charter included the charge that the town "at all perpetual future times ... be and remain a town and borough of Peace and Quiet, to the example and terror of the wicked and reward of the good". The layout of the town as depicted in Speed's map of 1610 would be easily recognisable to present day inhabitants, with the layout of the main axis clearly visible from the castle via the main street, Monnow Street, to the bridge. Monnow Street is a typical market street, in being wide in the middle (for those selling) and narrow at each end, to help prevent livestock escaping.

Monmouth School was founded by William Jones in 1614. The castle changed hands three times during the English Civil War, and Oliver Cromwell passed through on his way to retaking Chepstow Castle and laying siege to Pembroke Castle in 1648. Monmouth castle was slighted after the wars ended, but the town itself grew in prosperity. Great Castle House, built in 1673, is now the home of the Royal Monmouthshire Royal Engineers (Militia), the oldest regiment in the British Army. The Shire Hall was built in 1724, and was used for the local Assizes, with the area beneath the building serving as the town market.

By the end of the 18th century, the town had become a popular centre for visitors undertaking the "Wye Tour", an excursion by boat through the scenic Wye Valley taking in the picturesque sights of Ross-on-Wye, Goodrich, Tintern, Chepstow and elsewhere. Poets William Wordsworth, Samuel Coleridge, and Robert Southey, as well as painter J. M. W. Turner, were among those who visited the area.

=== Modern era ===
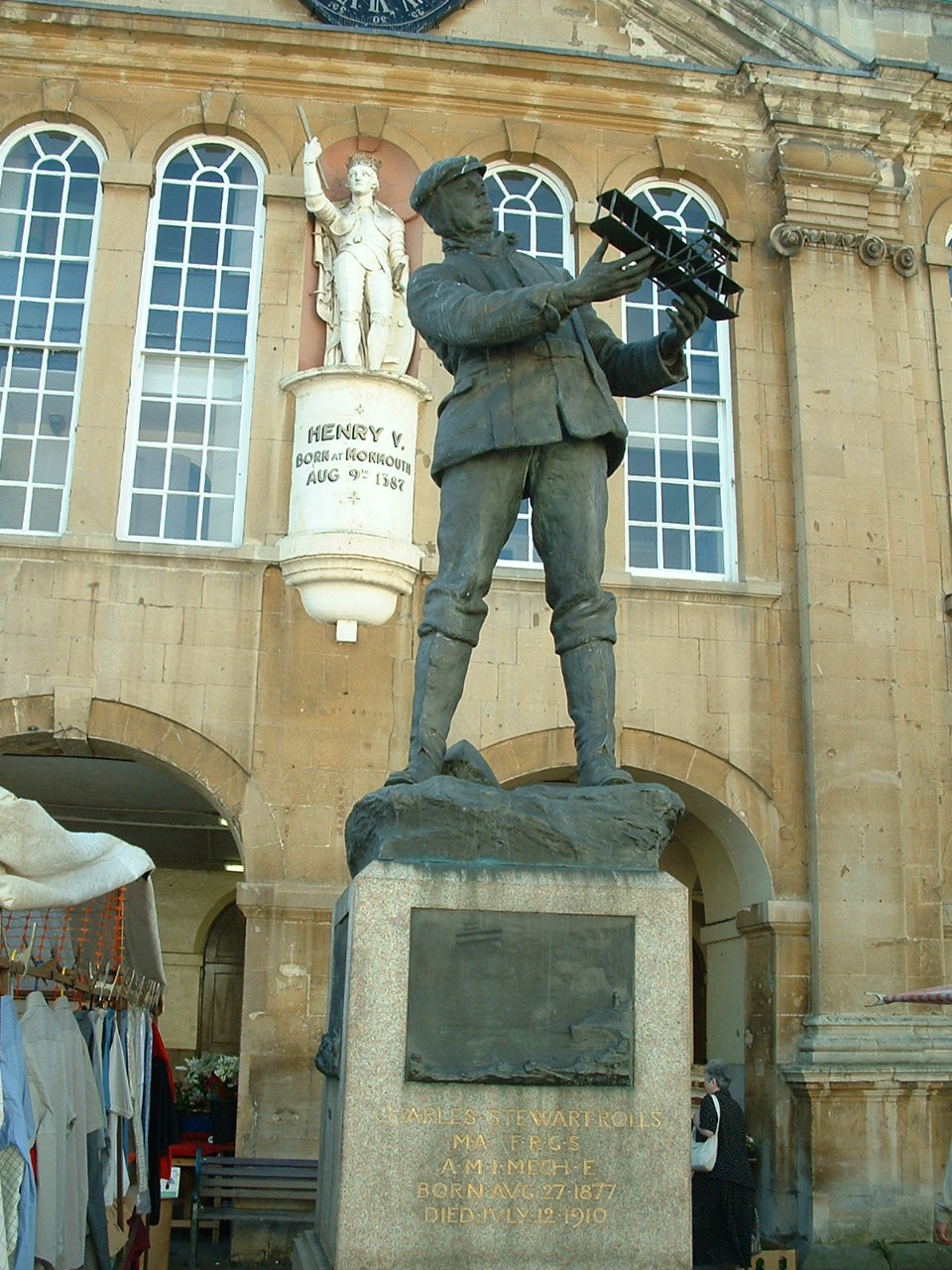
Statue of Charles Rolls at Shire Hall

The town was visited in 1802 by Admiral Horatio Nelson, who knew the importance of the area's woodland in providing timber for the British Navy and approved a Naval Temple built in his honour on the nearby Kymin Hill. Wooden ships up to 500 tons were built at a shipyard just south of Monmouth bridge until the new bridge at Chepstow was opened in 1816. Priory Street, the town's first bypass, was built in the 1830s, with the town slaughterhouse beneath. In 1840, at Monmouth's Shire Hall, Chartist protesters John Frost, Zephaniah Williams and William Jones became the last men in Britain to be sentenced to be hanged, drawn and quartered after being found guilty of treason following riots in Newport that led to 20 deaths. The sentences were later commuted to transportation to Van Diemen's Land.

Until the establishment of an official police force in 1857, Monmouth had a parish constable assisted by beadles to keep law and order. The appointed constables held office for a year and were often men who had experience in other local government or community roles. William Fuller who held office as Monmouth's constable for over twenty years in the early to mid 19th century, also served as Inspector of Nuisances, Chief of the Fire Brigade, Inspector of Weights and Measures, Clerk of the Market, and Conservator of the Wye.

Fuller is also recorded as having rescued people from drowning, acted as emergency midwife, and rescued a woman from a flooded house. The types of crime that Fuller and subsequent police officers had to deal with in and around Monmouth as the century progressed were recorded in detail in the local newspapers, the Merlin and the Monmouthshire Beacon. These crimes included theft of livestock, clothing, food, valuables, fuel (wood and coal); assault; vandalism; highway robbery; fraud; passing counterfeit coin; prostitution, and indecent exposure, as well as the more serious crimes of concealing the death of an infant, carnal knowledge without consent, and murder. The constable would have been present in court at Shire Hall when many of these cases came before the Quarter Sessions or Assizes. Once the court had passed sentence there was a wide range of punishments available to the authorities. Capital offences were dealt with at Monmouth County Gaol, as were whippings and sentences of hard labour. Although a police force of four constables and a sergeant was established in Monmouth in 1836, uncertain finances meant that within two years the force was reduced to just two constables.

Four railways were built to serve Monmouth between 1857 and 1883: the Coleford, Monmouth, Usk and Pontypool Railway, the Ross and Monmouth Railway, the Wye Valley Railway, and the Coleford Railway. All of these closed between 1917 and 1964. In 1896 a hydroelectric power station was built on the River Monnow at Osbaston, providing electrical power to the town until 1953. A new hydroelectric station was built on the same site and has operated since 2009, typically generating 670,000kWh annually.

In the late 19th and early 20th centuries, Monmouth had close links with the Rolls family, who built a mansion at The Hendre just outside the town. In 1904, Charles Rolls established a new car making business with Henry Royce, but in 1910 he was killed in an aeroplane crash at the age of 32; he is commemorated by a statue in Agincourt Square. St Mary's Church contains a memorial to the men of who died in HMS Monmouth, which was sunk with all hands on 1 November 1914, by German cruisers SMS Scharnhorst and SMS Gneisenau off the Chilean Coast at the Battle of Coronel during the First World War; the church hosts an annual service in remembrance. Seven Royal Navy ships have been named after the town, including a Type 23 frigate launched in 1991 which is still in operation. The remains of two pillboxes stand on the Wyesham side of the Wye Bridge. They were built in 1940/1 as part of the Western Command Stop Line No. 27, designed to impede a German invasion force.

Monmouth remained a relatively quiet town for most of the 20th century; its passenger rail services ended in 1959, but its road connections were improved with the new A40 bypassing the town in 1966, although this "severed the town ruthlessly from the river on which in the past it had depended", and later connecting the town to the motorway system. These improved communications contributed to the development of the town, with suburbs extending beyond the rivers Wye and Monnow to the south-east, west and north of the old town centre. In July 2015 the town adopted a flag.

On 15 November 2025 the River Monnow burst its banks and unprecedented floods, 'the worst in fifty years' inundated large parts of the town. In response, a major incident was declared.

== Monmouthpedia ==
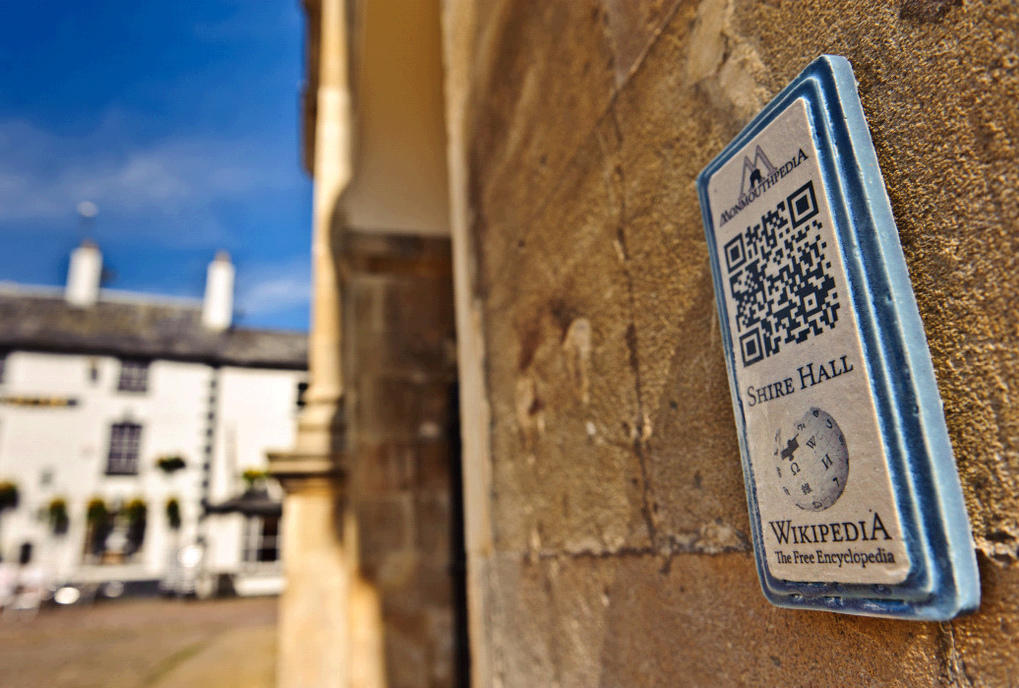
A QRpedia QR code outside Shire Hall

Monmouth is the focus of Monmouthpedia, the first Wikipedia GLAM project to cover a whole town, creating Wikipedia articles on interesting and notable features and aspects of the town. It uses QRpedia QR codes to deliver articles to users, in English, Welsh or alternative languages.

== Geography ==
Monmouth is in an area of Devonian age Old Red Sandstone, at the point where the River Wye is joined by its tributary, the River Monnow, and immediately north of the point at which the smaller River Trothy flows into the Wye from the west. Immediately to the south, the Wye enters a valley, incised into sandstone and, in particular, Carboniferous Limestone. The town is surrounded by wooded hills to its north, east and south, including Buckholt Wood (230 m or 750 ft), The Kymin (260 m or 850 ft), and The Graig (258 m or 846 ft), with more gently undulating terrain to the west. The town centre itself is sited on a low-lying spur between the floodplains of the Wye and Monnow, and has frequently suffered from severe flooding. The water-meadows to the north and south of the town centre, known respectively as Vauxhall Fields and Chippenham Mead, have generally remained free of development.

In climatic terms, the town is located between those areas around the Severn Estuary which show a maritime influence, and the cooler and drier conditions of the English Midlands further inland. The nearby Ross-on-Wye weather station shows average daily maximum temperatures ranging from 7.3 °C (45.1 °F) in January to 22.0 °C (71.6 °F) in July, with 1504 hours of sunshine per year, and an average annual rainfall of 706 millimetres (27.8 in).

== Transport ==
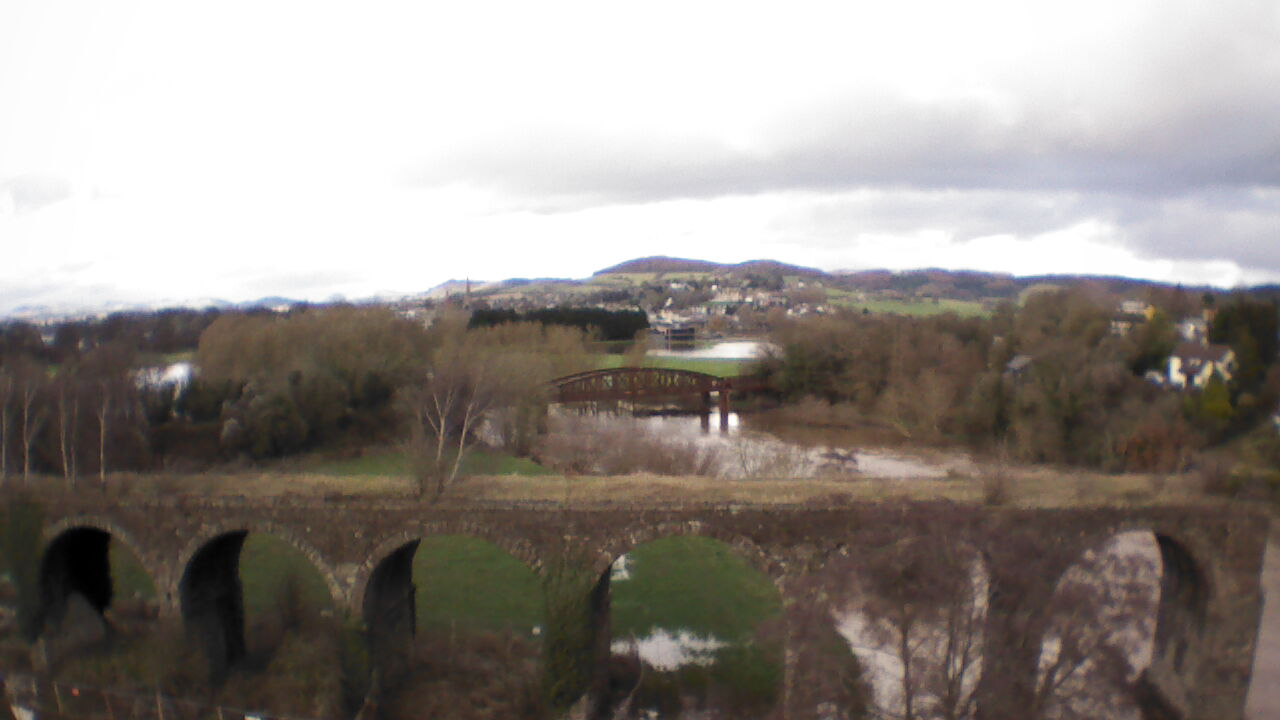
Missing rail links in Monmouth, foreground Wye Valley Railway and background Ross and Monmouth Railway linked to missing Hereford, Ross and Gloucester Railway in Ross-on-Wye.

Since 1966, the A40 dual carriageway road runs past Monmouth linking with the M50 motorway at Ross-on-Wye. It follows the River Wye valley from the northeast of Monmouth. Southwest of the town, the road passes through a short tunnel beneath Gibraltar Hill. The A466 road, also known as the Wye Valley Road, crosses the River Wye and the A40 at Monmouth, linking Chepstow and Hereford, and provides access to the M48 motorway at the Welsh end of the Severn Bridge.

The distances of airports from Monmouth are, Bristol Airport 41 miles (66 km), Cardiff Airport 49 miles (79 km) and London Heathrow Airport 120 miles (190 km).

Regular but infrequent bus services run between the town and Hereford, Ross-on-Wye, Coleford, Chepstow, Newport and Abergavenny.

Monmouth has been without passenger rail services since January 1959; goods trains ran until 1964. Monmouth's main railway station, known as Monmouth Troy, was a coal distribution depot and a base for heavy goods vehicles for many years after its closure as a part of the rail network, but the building has now been dismantled and re-erected at Winchcombe railway station on the Gloucestershire Warwickshire Railway. The other station at Monmouth was Monmouth May Hill on the Ross and Monmouth Railway, built on the opposite bank of the Wye to the town centre. This operated for many years as Monmouth Sawmills and Gas Works after its closure as part of the rail network.

== Governance ==
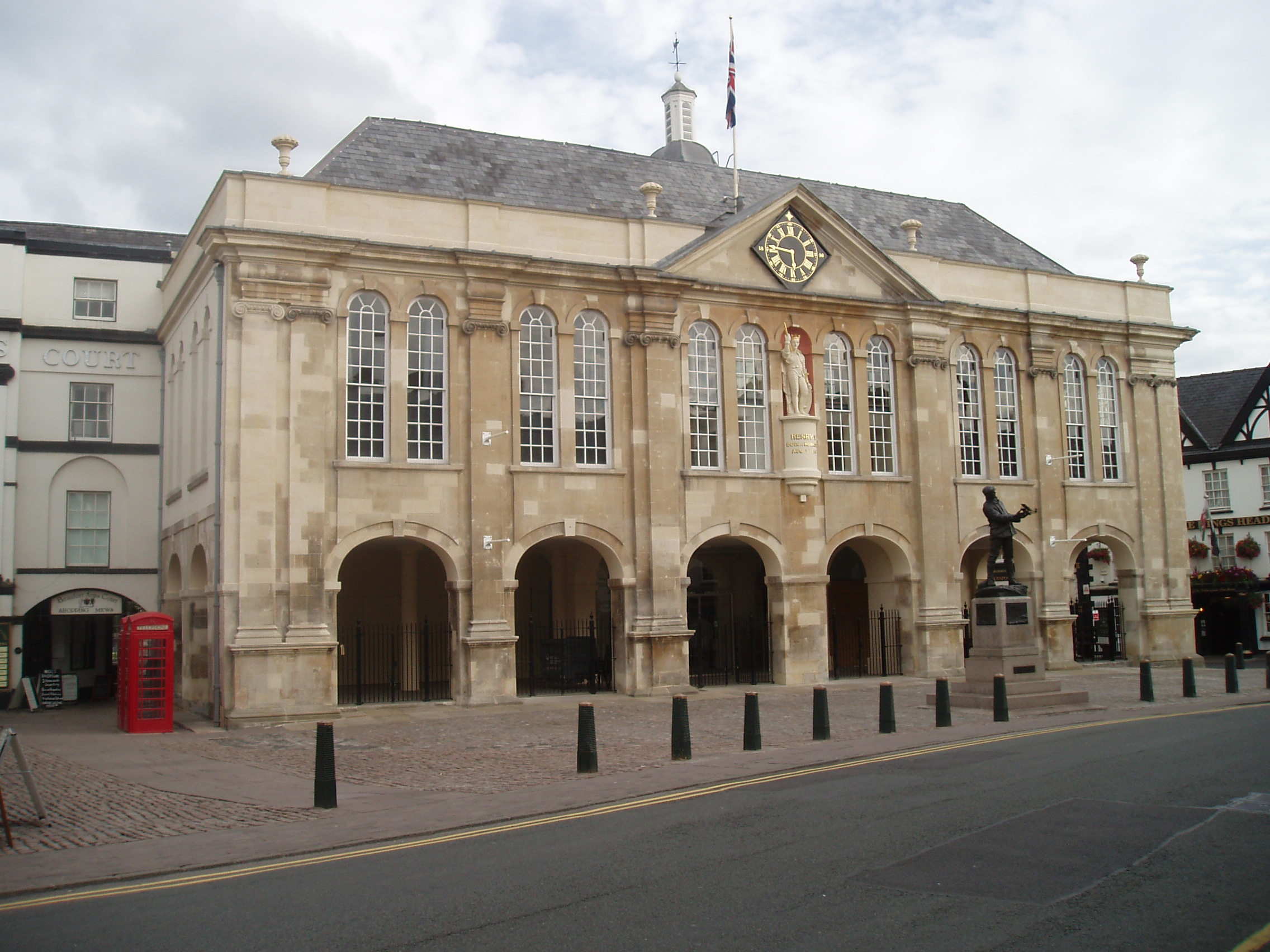
Shire Hall in Agincourt Square, completed in 1724, as a court of assizes and quarter sessions, scene of the Chartist trial in 1840.

Monmouth is administered by Monmouthshire County Council, one of the 22 unitary local authorities in Wales formed in 1996. Its offices were located until 2012 at the former Gwent County Hall at Croesyceiliog, Cwmbran; its main offices are now located at Rhadyr, just outside Usk. The town elects five county councillors, for the wards of Dixton with Osbaston, Drybridge, Overmonnow, Town and Wyesham; as of March 2024, three councillors are Welsh Labour, two independent and one Welsh Conservative. The town also has its own town council, comprising 19 councillors elected every five years. The mayor of Monmouth for the year 2025/2026 is councillor Jackie Atkin.

Monmouth had a mayor and burgesses in medieval times, and the town gained its first charter, from Henry VI, in 1447. It was included within the Hundred of Skenfrith after the county of Monmouthshire was formed. Following the Municipal Corporations Act 1835, the town elected a borough council, comprising a mayor, aldermen and councillors. In 1974 that corporation was abolished, and the town became part of the much larger Monmouth District (becoming Monmouth Borough in 1988), which until 1996 formed one of the five districts of Gwent.

The town was first represented in Parliament in 1536, when it was allocated one seat and the shire two further seats. By the late 17th century, the electorate of the three seats comprised the resident freemen of Monmouth, Newport and Usk, and after the Great Reform Act of 1832 the constituency was generally referred to as the Monmouth Boroughs. The Representation of the People Act 1918 led to Newport becoming a parliamentary borough in its own right, and Monmouth was included in the new Monmouth county constituency. The town remained part of the Monmouth constituency in subsequent elections, although the constituency boundary has changed several times, until 2024 when it became part of the Monmouthshire constituency. Notable Members of Parliament (MPs) for the area have included the industrialist Crawshay Bailey from 1852 to 1868; Peter Thorneycroft, Chancellor of the Exchequer in 1957–58 and Chairman of the Conservative Party 1975–81, who was the town's MP from 1945 to 1966; and John Stradling Thomas, MP from 1970 to 1991. The constituency has returned a Conservative MP at most recent elections; the current (Labour) member is Catherine Fookes, first elected in 2024. In elections for the Senedd, the town is part of the Monmouth constituency; the current MS is Peter Fox (Conservative). Until January 2020, Monmouth was within the Wales constituency for the European Parliament.

The Laws in Wales Acts created an anomaly in that, although Monmouthshire was noted as being in the 'Country or Dominion of Wales', it was made directly responsible to the courts of Westminster rather than falling under the Court of Great Sessions in Wales. Ecclesiastically, until 1836 the town of Monmouth fell within the diocese of Hereford, rather than that of Llandaff. These arrangements gave rise to the widespread belief that the area was part of England rather than Wales, although most legislation for Wales was applied to it using the phrase "Wales and Monmouthshire". Following the Welsh Church Act 1914, the Church in Wales established the Diocese of Monmouth in 1921, and in 1949, Monmouthshire was included within the remit of the Council for Wales and Monmouthshire, an appointed precursor of the Welsh Office. The issue of whether Monmouth should be considered as part of Wales for administrative purposes was finally clarified in law by the Local Government Act 1972, which incorporated Monmouthshire within Wales.

== Economy ==
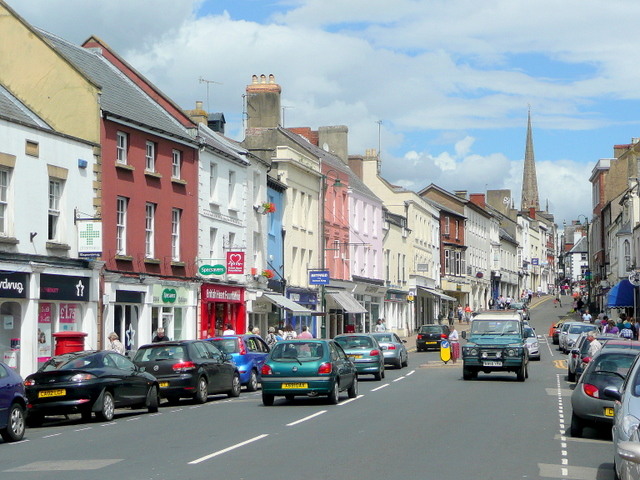
Monnow Street, historically the site of the town's market and now its main shopping street

Monmouth developed primarily as a market town, and agricultural centre, rather than as a centre of industry. The wool industry was important in its early growth, and the town was a centre for the production of the very popular knitted and felted Monmouth caps, from the 15th century onwards. Historically, Monmouth also had iron and tinplate works, together with paper and corn mills. The town was also an important river port, with warehouses and wharves along the Wye later removed for the building of the A40 relief road.

Monmouth is now primarily a centre for service industries and tourism, and its good road communications have encouraged commuting to larger centres in the West Midlands, South Wales, and Bristol. The Monmouth and District Chamber of Trade and Commerce represents businesses in the town and aims to support and encourage their development.

The town has a variety of both national and independent shops, most situated along Monnow Street. There are a number of supermarkets, some banks although the numbers have declined in the 21st century, and independent cafes and restaurants. Church Street, a cobbled pedestrianised street, contains craft shops, a book shop, a greengrocer, chemist, coffee shops and restaurants. Monmouth has been a Fairtrade town since 2005. A regular market takes place close to the Monnow Bridge, and occasionally in the traditional market place in Agincourt Square. There are numerous public houses in the town.

According to the 2001 census, Monmouth had relatively high proportions of its population working in the retail and wholesale sectors of the economy (19.5%, compared with 16.3% for Wales as a whole), education (11.8%, compared with 8.1% across Wales), and property services (10.8%, compared with 8.5% across Wales). The proportion working in manufacturing was lower than the average (16.5% compared with 17.3% across Wales), as was the proportion in public administration (4.3% compared with 6.8% across Wales). In terms of occupational groups, the proportion of residents in managerial and professional posts was higher than average (30.1% compared with 22.7% across Wales), and the proportions in administrative and processing work were lower (8.7% in each group, compared with 12.2% and 10.2% respectively across Wales).

== Demography ==
The usual resident population in the 2001 census was 8,877. Of that total, 1,760 (19.8%) were aged 15 or younger; 1,227 (13.8%) between 16 and 29; 1,687 (21.1%) between 30 and 44; 1,849 (20.8%) between 45 and 59; 1,386 (15.6%) between 60 and 74; and 968 (10.9%) aged 75 or over. The median age of residents was 42, in comparison to a Wales-wide median age of 39. The town's population increased from 5,504 in 1961 to 8,877 in 2001, a growth of 61% over forty years.

== Education ==
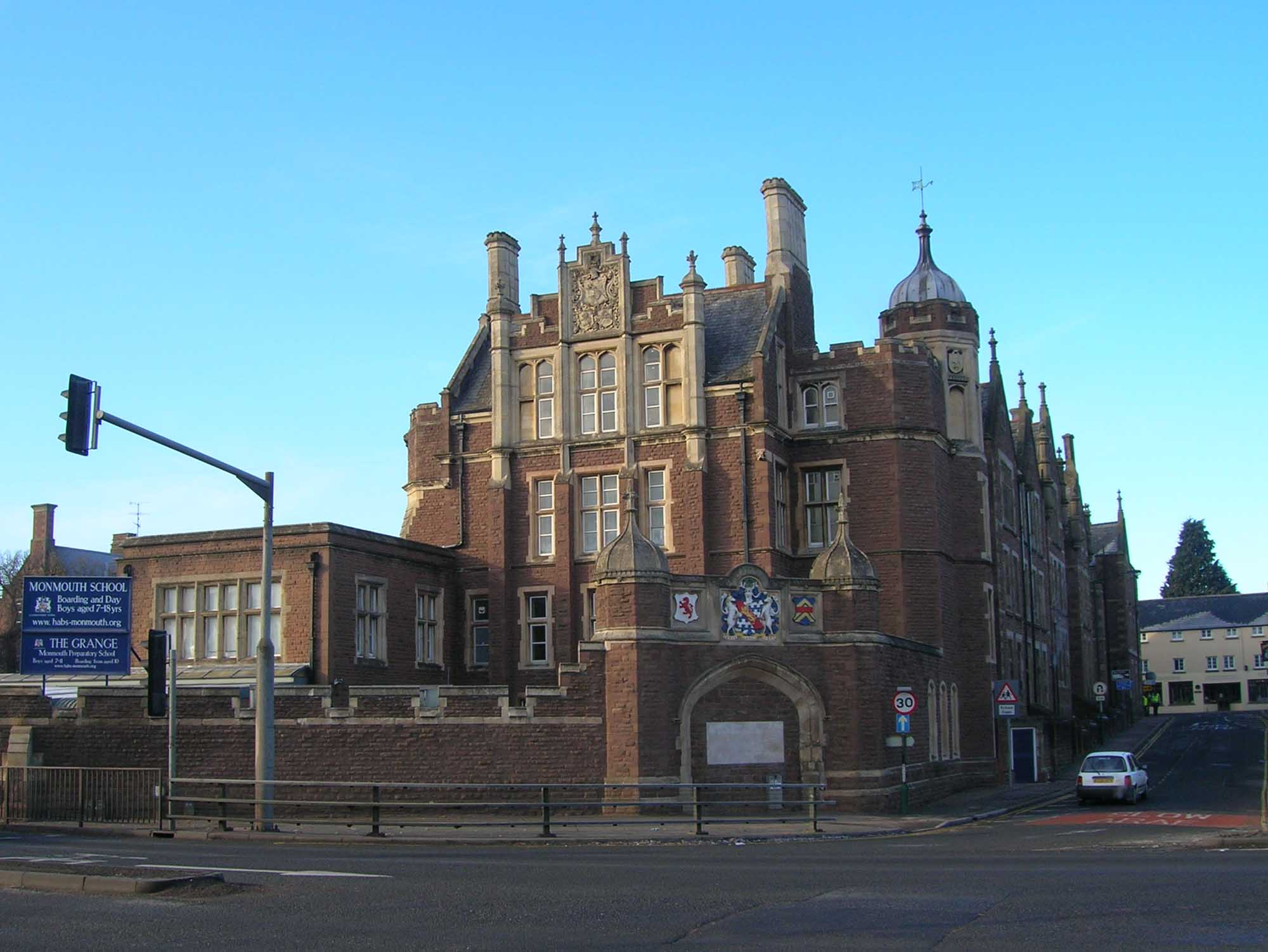
Monmouth School founded in 1614

There are three primary schools in the town: Kymin View, Osbaston, and Overmonnow.

The secondary schooling needs of the town are served by Monmouth Comprehensive School which had over 1,600 pupils in 2012. Welsh medium secondary education is provided at Ysgol Gyfun Gwynllyw in Pontypool. In 2024 a Welsh- medium primary school opened at Ysgol Gymraeg Trefynwy, sharing premises with the Overmonnow primary school. Monmouth also has independent schooling including; the Monmouth Schools, a group of four boarding and day schools. Monmouth University of the Third Age (U3A) offers educational and leisure activities for retired and semi-retired people.

== Health and social care ==
Health care services are provided by the Aneurin Bevan Health Board, part of the National Health Service. Following the closure of the Cottage Hospital in 2006, health services are provided at the Monnow Vale Integrated Health and Social Care Facility.

The Bridges Community Centre in Drybridge House adjacent to the Health and Social Care Facility provides support services to disadvantaged and vulnerable people.

== Religion ==
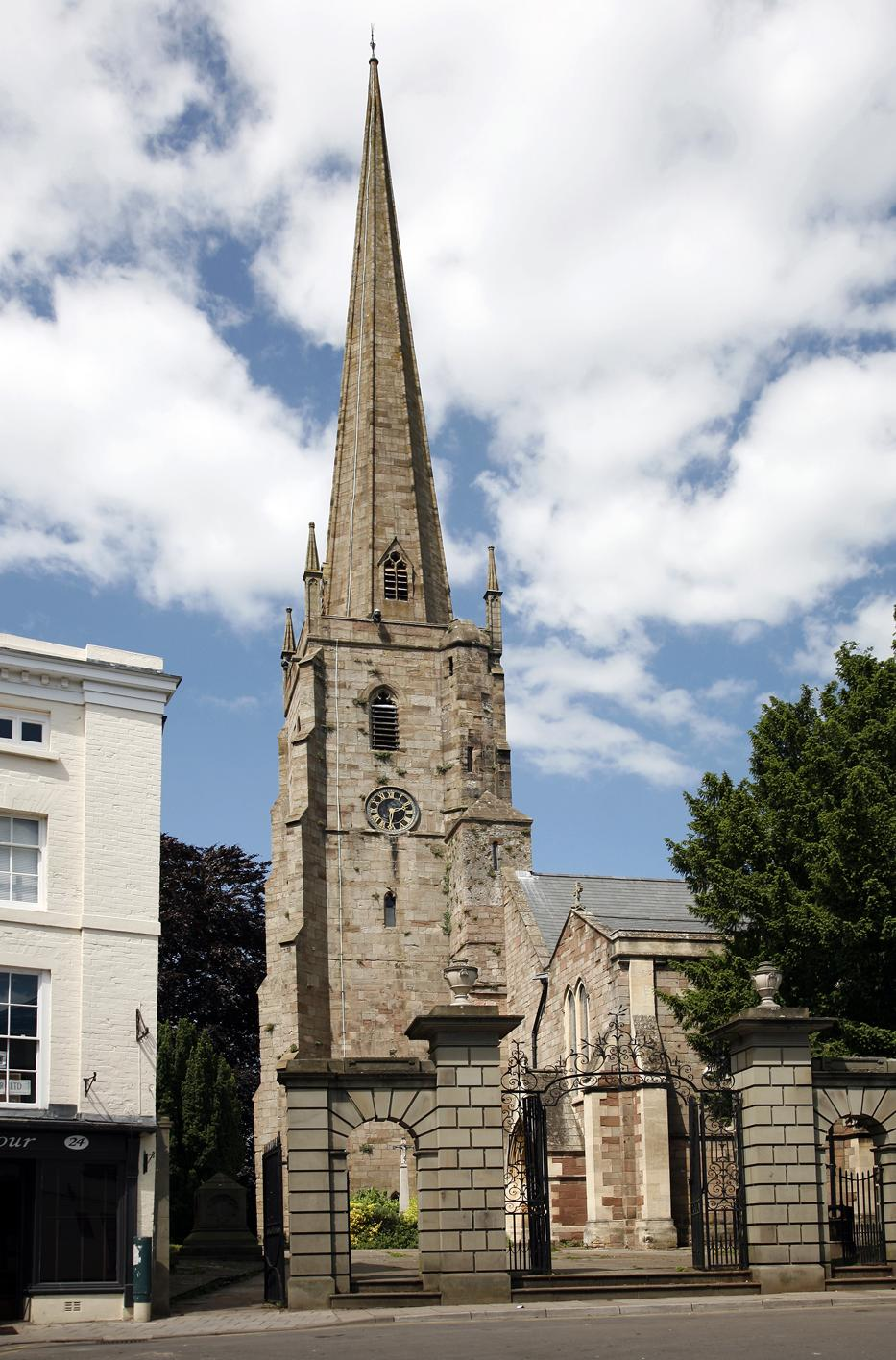
St Mary's Priory Church

In the 2001 census, 74.2% of the town's resident population gave their religion as Christian, with 16.7% stating "no religion". Minority religions included Muslim (0.2%), Sikh (0.2%), and Buddhist (0.2%).

Monmouth contains churches of several denominations. Within the Church in Wales, the Monmouth Group of Parishes includes the Priory Church of St Mary, which holds regular weekly services. The church was founded as a Benedictine priory around 1075. It fell into ruin after the Dissolution of the Monasteries in 1536, but was rebuilt as a parish church in 1737, and then completely rebuilt again in 1882. The church spire is prominent in views of, and within, the town. Other Anglican churches in the local group of parishes are St Thomas' at Overmonnow, and the churches at Mitchel Troy, Wonastow and Buckholt. The Diocese of Monmouth, the cathedral of which is the Cathedral Church of St Woolos in Newport, is one of the six dioceses of the Church in Wales. The churches at Wyesham and Dixton, though within the boundaries of Wales, are administered by the Church of England, and fall within the Diocese of Hereford.

St Mary's Roman Catholic Church was the first Catholic church to be built in Wales after the Reformation, and its construction followed the relaxation of laws against Catholics in 1778. The building was extended on several occasions in the 19th century. Monmouth Methodist Church is noted for both its exterior and interior architectural features. The Baptist Church was founded in 1818, though the current church was not constructed until 1907. There is a Christian Fellowship church at Wyesham.

== Culture and regular events ==
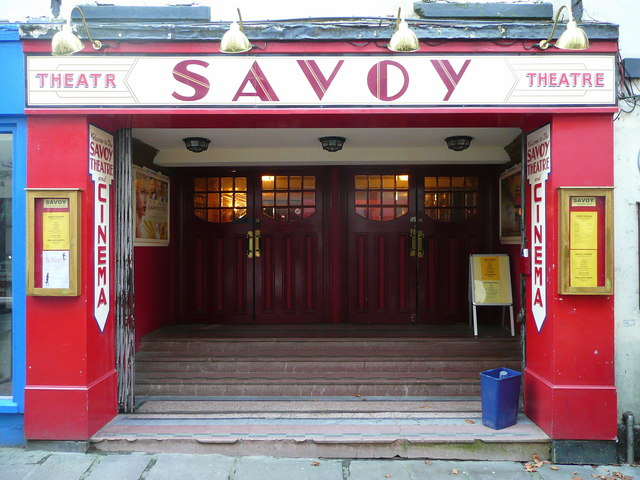
Entrance to the Savoy Theatre, the oldest working theatre in Wales

The Savoy Theatre, on Church Street, is the oldest working theatre in Wales. Monmouth is also home to the Blake Theatre, which opened in 2004. Local performance groups include the Off Centre Theatre Company, Monmouth Operatic Society, Monmouth Choral Society, and the Merlin Society, one of the largest music societies in the country. The Monmouthshire Show (formerly the Monmouth Show) has been held each year, traditionally on the last Thursday of August, since 1919, though its history can be traced back to 1857. Prior to that there had been an agricultural society in the town dating back to the 1790s, which held ploughing competitions. The show, now held on the third Saturday in July, is the largest one-day agricultural show in Wales, with over 350 trade stands.

The Monmouth Museum, formerly the Nelson Museum, is home to one of the largest collections of Nelson material, bequeathed to the town by Lady Llangattock, mother of Charles Rolls. It also displays the only known example of an original Monmouth cap, dating from the 16th century. The museum is currently closed, prior to its relocation to the Shire Hall. A small Regimental Museum established in 1989 is housed in Great Castle House, a former town house built on the site of part of Monmouth Castle. The Monmouth Festival, a free nine-day music festival, has been running every year since 1982 and is one of the largest free music festivals in Europe. The town also holds the Rockfield Country Music Festival and the Monmouth Women's Festival each year. An annual regatta is held, each May, and a raft race takes place each year for the St David's Foundation. Location scenes for two episodes of the BBC drama series Doctor Who were filmed in Monmouth: "The Unquiet Dead" (2005) and "The Next Doctor" (2008). Monmouth was named one of the best places to live in Wales in 2017. In 2020 the international beekeeping charity organisation Bees for Development designated Monmouth a "Bee Town", the first such in Britain. An annual Bee Festival is held, which takes place in the Nelson Garden and Chippenham Fields. The county and town councils have special policies in place for pollinators. The Welsh language and culture are promoted by the Monmouth & District Welsh Society (Cymdeithas Gymraeg Trefynwy a'r Cylch). Monmouth is twinned with the French town of Carbonne, and Waldbronn in Germany.

== Sport, leisure and tourism ==
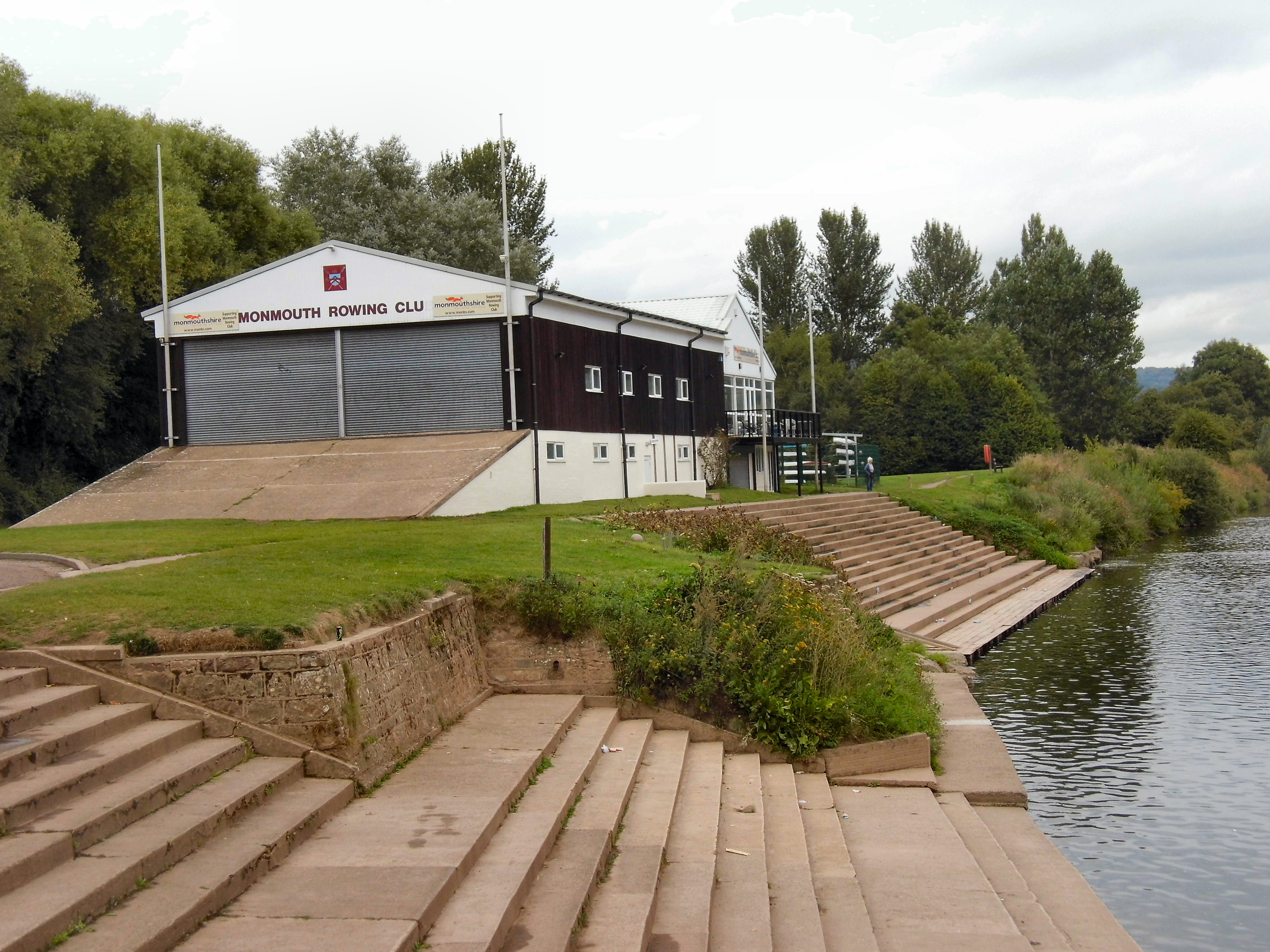
Boathouse of Monmouth Rowing Club

Monmouth is home to Monmouth Town F.C., a football club founded around 1905. It plays in the Ardal League South East (third tier) at the Chippenham Sports Ground. The town has a leisure centre, on the site of the comprehensive school, with a 20m x 10m swimming pool. In 2011 the swimming pool underwent a £300,000 refurbishment. There is an 18-hole golf course on the edge of the town, as well as the Rolls Golf Club at The Hendre. There are also cricket, bowls and rugby clubs. Monmouth is the current training base for the Welsh Men's National Lacrosse team, which trained at Monmouth Girls School before the 2014 world championships. Monmouth has a rowing tradition on the River Wye, with the Monmouth Rowing Club, founded in 1928, whose boathouse also hosts the rowing clubs of Monmouth Comprehensive School and of Monmouth School for Girls, and Monmouth School for Boys Rowing club, which has its own boathouse on the opposite bank of the Wye.

Monmouth has been established as a tourist centre for some 200 years. It is in close proximity to the Forest of Dean and Wye Valley. Tourist attractions within the town include the castle, The Kymin, the museum, the Nelson Garden and the Shire Hall where the Tourist Information Centre and visitor centre is located. The area is also attractive to walkers. Both the Offa's Dyke Path, a long-distance footpath beginning in Chepstow and finishing in North Wales, and the Wye Valley Walk passing through the town.

== Notable people ==
People associated with Monmouth include Geoffrey of Monmouth, the Oxford-based cleric, born in about 1100 and believed to be originally from the area, who wrote Historia Regum Britanniae, the "History of British Kings". Gilbert de Clare, 6th Earl of Hertford and Guardian of England, died at the castle in 1295, and King Edward II was briefly imprisoned there in 1326. The future Henry V, the victor at the battle of Agincourt in 1415, was born in the castle in 1386. Philip Evans, Jesuit priest and martyr, was born in the town in 1645.

Horatio Nelson visited Monmouth on several occasions and in 1802, after visiting the Kymin Naval Temple, spoke at the Beaufort Arms Hotel. After his death, the garden where he dined with Lady Hamilton after the speech was named the Nelson Garden. William Allen was awarded the Victoria Cross for his actions in the Battle of Rorke's Drift (1879), and is buried in Monmouth Cemetery.

Rockfield Studios, situated just outside the town, have hosted many prominent bands including Queen and Oasis. Notable rock guitarist Brian Godding was born in the town and musician Dave Edmunds lives there. Other former or current residents of the area have included poet and singer-songwriter Jake Thackray, rugby international and commentator Eddie Butler, television presenter Kate Humble, historian and TV presenter Professor Saul David, astrologer Russell Grant, historian Keith Kissack and comedian Miles Jupp. Monmouth is the home of composer, organist and choirmaster Robert Jones.

== Gallery ==
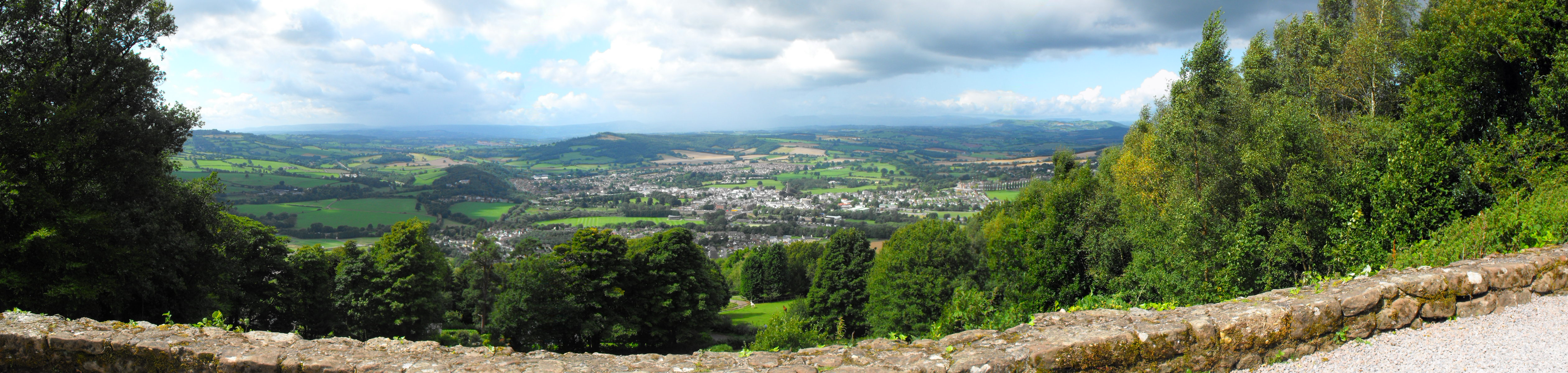
View westwards over Monmouth from The Kymin

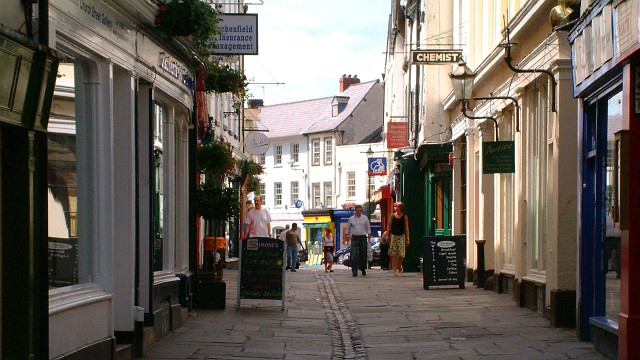
Church Street, a pedestrianised shopping area

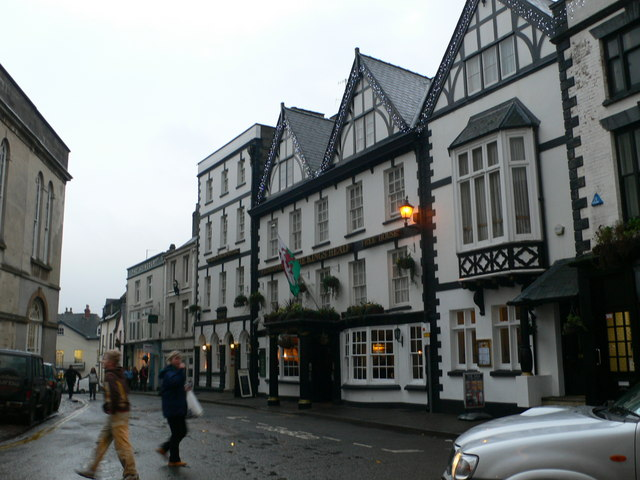
Part of Agincourt Square, showing the King's Head Hotel

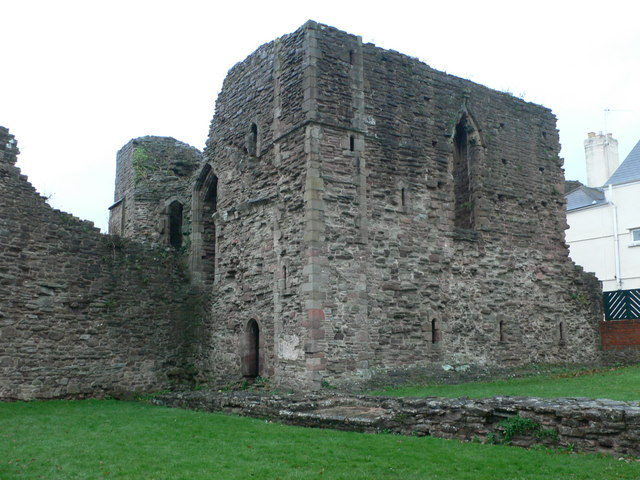
Remains of the Great Tower of Monmouth Castle

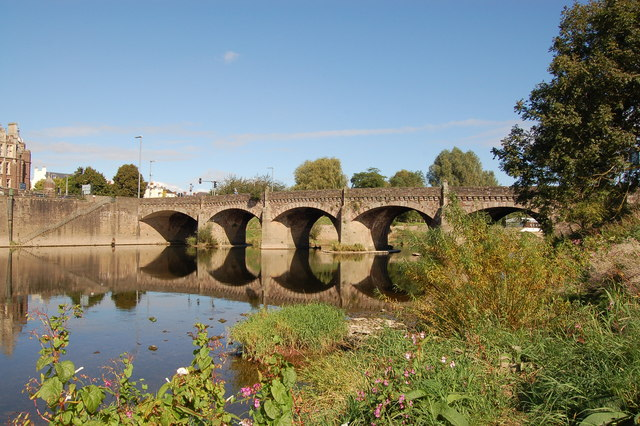
Wye Bridge on the River Wye

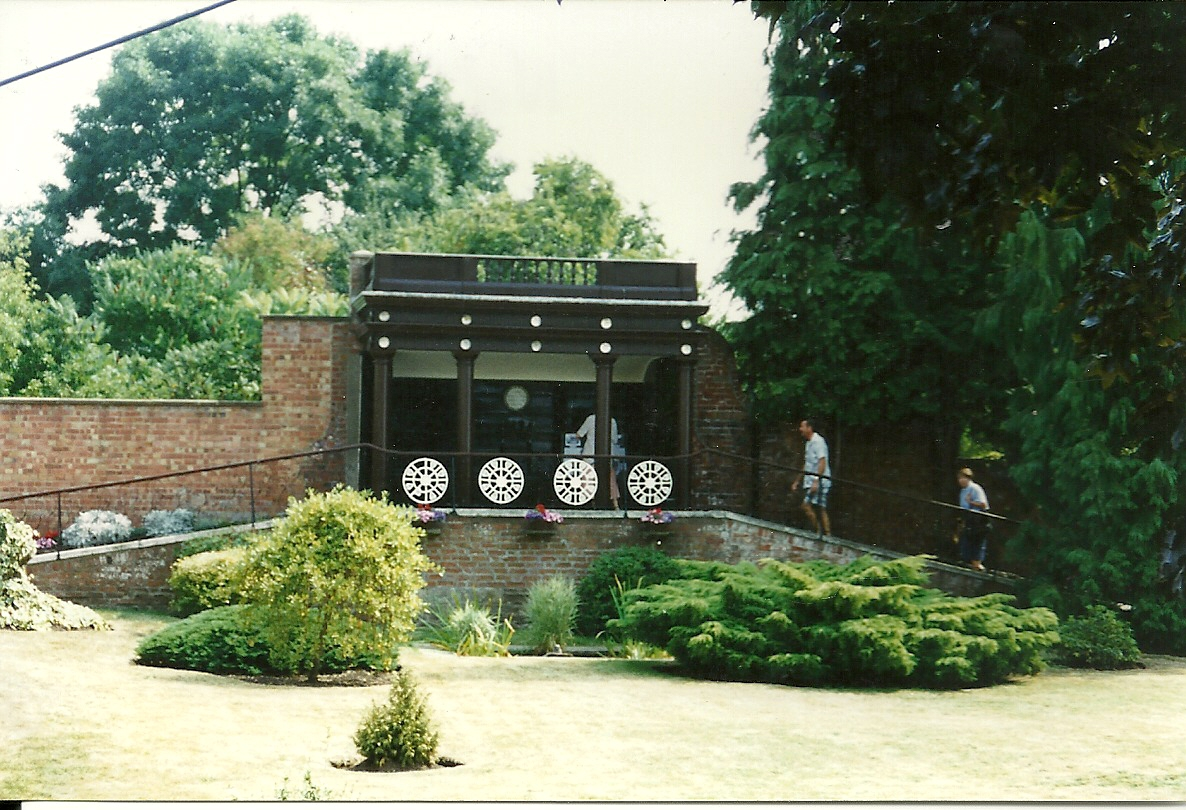
The Nelson Garden

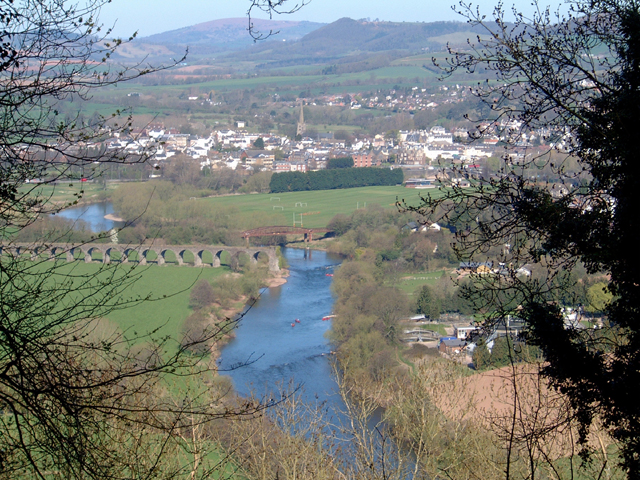
Closed railway lines from Monmouth Troy to Chepstow, Ross-on-Wye thence to either Hereford and Gloucester

== See also ==
- Outline of Wales
