= Undecimus Stratton =

Undecimus Stratton (1868 – 12 July 1929) was the manager of Daimler's London depot and supplier of automobiles to British, Spanish and German royalty. Along with Ernest Instone, he took over the management of the depot under the name Stratton-Instone, which later became the automobile dealership Stratstone (now part of Lithia Motors).

== Early life ==
Stratton was born in 1868 to Undecimus and Margaret Stratton, of Compton Grange, near Wolverhampton. His father, a solicitor, was named "Undecimus" after his own father, neither of whom was an eleventh child; the name had been used by the Stratton family for generations and it was bestowed in light of this usage. The Strattons were originally of – and took their name from – Stratton, Cornwall, settling at Brinkworth, Wiltshire in the 1600s.

Stratton's close friends would call him Eugene, or "Gene" for short. A notable runner and rugby player, Stratton read for a law degree but did not continue into the profession. Instead, he bought land with money he had saved and built a brewery on the property. He married Lily O'Hara Thompson, a society beauty, in February 1898 and, in his early thirties, retired to an estate to train his racehorses and trotting horses.

Stratton was a pioneer motorist who bought his first car, a Daimler, in 1898. Fellow motorist and balloon enthusiast, The Honourable Sir Charles Rolls, was a close friend of Stratton's and offered him a partnership in a new motor sales venture. Stratton declined, and Rolls started C. S. Rolls & Co. with Claude Johnson. In 1905, Stratton, Rolls and Frank Hedges Butler set a balloon altitude record of 7,000 feet (2,100 metres).

== Association with Daimler and its Royal customers ==
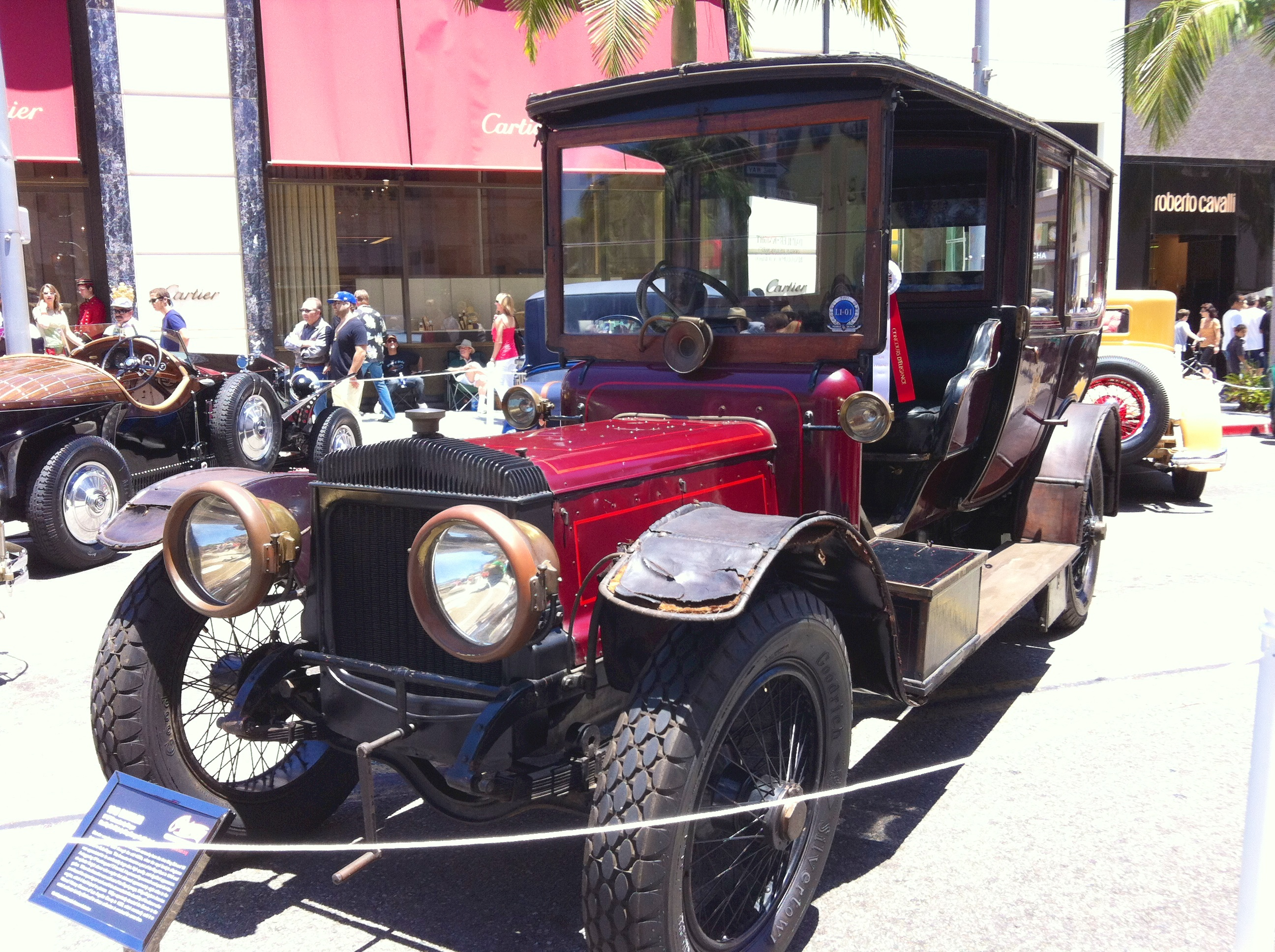
1910 Daimler limousine, sold to George V by Stratton

In 1903, shortly after turning down Rolls' partnership offer, Stratton met E. G. Jenkinson, the chairman of Daimler, when Jenkinson's Daimler was stranded on the side of the road. Upon seeing the stranded motorist, Stratton stopped his Daimler and offered assistance. Jenkinson was impressed by Stratton and by his motoring knowledge. At the time, Jenkinson was looking to replace the head of Daimler's London depot, a particularly sensitive position because of the royal cars. Taking the position, Stratton soon found himself having to select better royal chauffeurs and mechanics. He quickly became an occasional motoring companion to the King and, within five years, supplier to other monarchs including the Emperor of Germany, the Sultan of Johor, and the King of Spain, who knighted Stratton into the Royal Order of Isabella the Catholic. In 1911 he spent some weekends at Sandringham tutoring the new Prince of Wales on the workings and driving of an automobile.

== Stratton-Instone ==
In 1921 Stratton went into partnership with Daimler's commercial manager Ernest Instone. Stratton and Instone took charge of the Daimler showrooms at 27 Pall Mall, naming the business Stratton-Instone. Each morning at eleven a butler in morning suit brought oysters and champagne to the directors' rooms.

== Death ==
One of Stratton's last services for King George V was to convert one of His Majesty's large Daimlers into an ambulance to carry him to Bognor, Sussex, to recover from a feverish cold in early 1929. Stratton died on 12 July of that year after a short illness. King George V and Queen Mary, upon Stratton's death, expressed their "deepest and most heartfelt sympathy" and stated "it is a source of the greatest regret... that they will never be able to avail themselves again of the invaluable advice and assistance [he] has given them for so many years."

The following summer, the future King Edward VIII rented Stratton's house at Sunningdale from his widow Muriel (Stratton's second wife; his first, Lily, having died in 1916). In 1930, Stratton's successors and Instone bought out Daimler's interest in Stratton-Instone and renamed the business Stratstone Limited.
