= Agincourt Square, Monmouth =

Open space in Monmouth, Wales

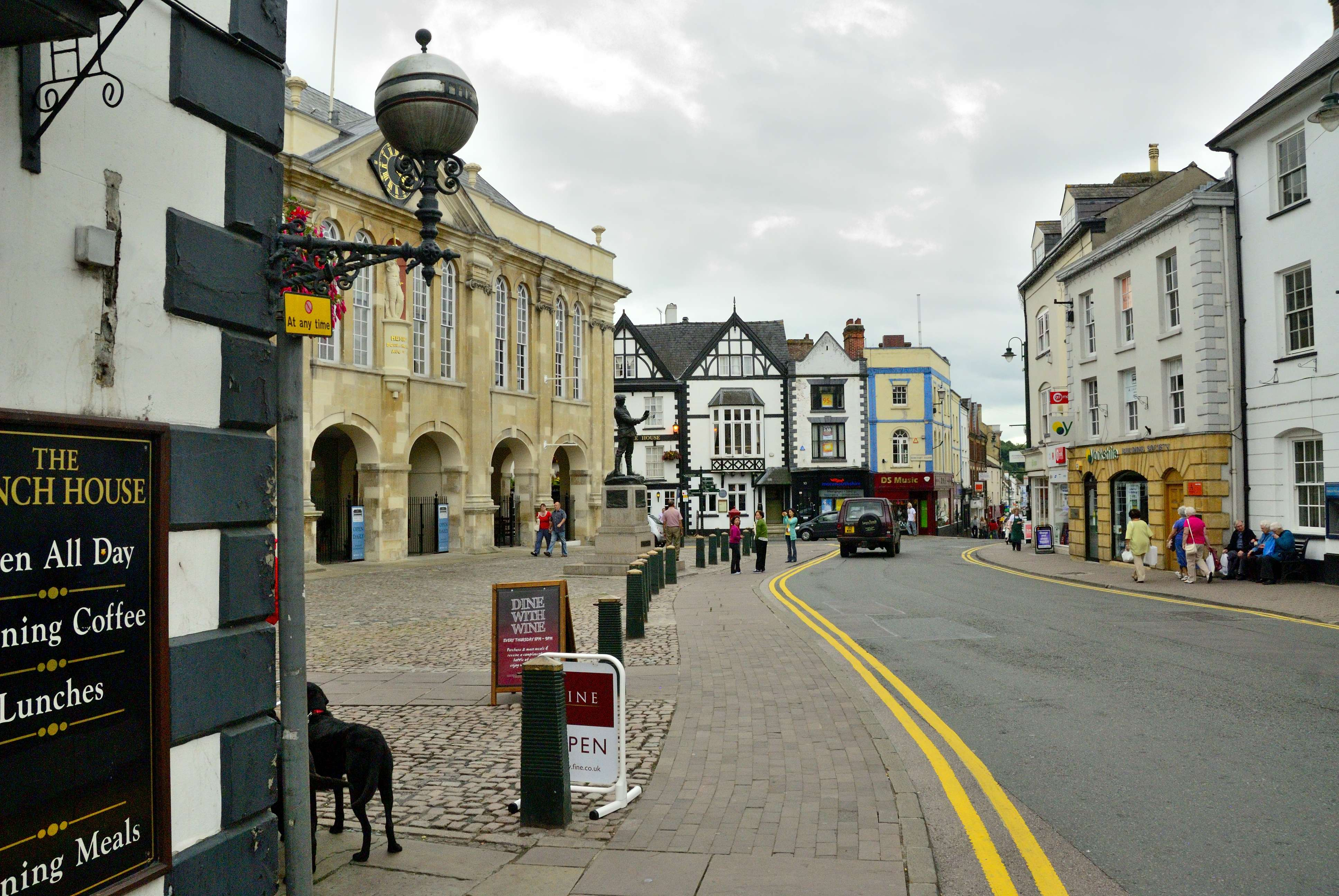
- General view of the square, looking towards the southwest
- Interactive map of Agincourt Square, Monmouth
- Former name: Market Place
- Location: Monmouth, Monmouthshire, Wales
- Postal code: NP25
- Coordinates: 51.812124°N 2.715489°W
- North: Priory Street
- East: Castle Hill
- South: Monnow Street
- West: Church Street; Agincourt Street

Agincourt Square is an open space in the centre of Monmouth, Wales, in front of the Shire Hall. The area has been used for public functions and markets over the centuries.

== History ==
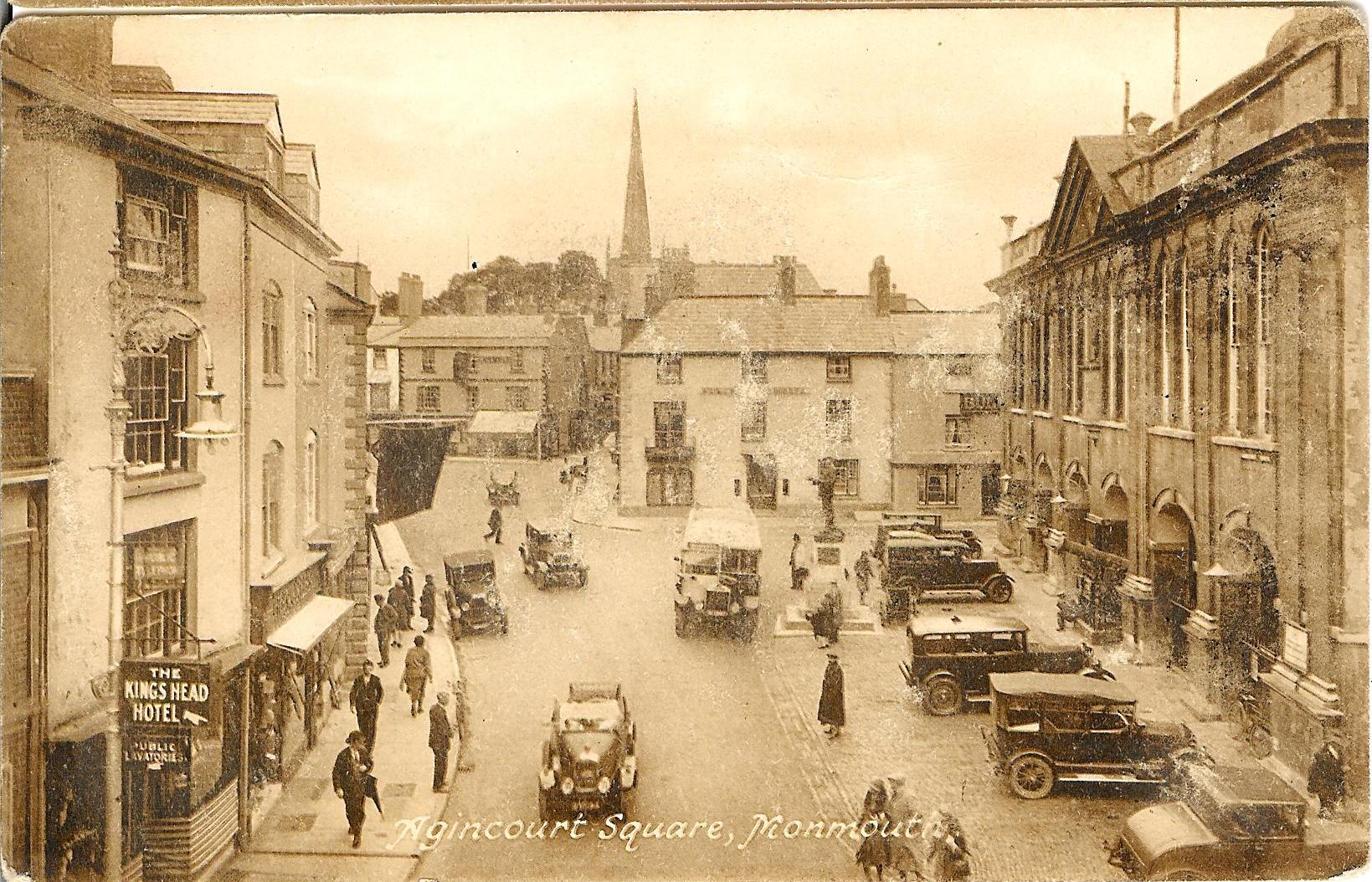
Agincourt Square in the 1930s, looking towards the northeast

The medieval market place in Monmouth developed from the bailey of the castle, and originally covered a much larger area than the present square. The square was the venue of the town's market, both before and after the Shire Hall was built in 1724. It was known as the Market Place in 1804, according to the local publisher Charles Heath.

In the early part of the 19th century, the marketplace was given the name of Agincourt Square, to commemorate the victory in 1415 of Henry V, who had been born in the town, over the French. It was also intended to help promote local tourism, which had prospered through the growth of the "Wye Tour". Sources differ as to whether the renaming took place in 1817 – that is, two years after the Battle of Waterloo and the defeat of Napoleon – or in 1830.

During the 19th century, farmers drove their flocks of animals through the square on their way to the slaughter houses in Priory Street. The square was used as the meeting venue for fox hunts for many years. It has also been used to host open air public meetings. Many of the buildings around the square were once public houses. There were 15 pubs in the square in 1835; this gave rise to a rhyme "A gin court here, a gin court there, no wonder they call it Agincourt Square". There are now just two pubs left: the Punch House and the Kings Head.

In 1879 a young man advertised for a wife and received a photograph from an actress of the time and a letter making an appointment in Agincourt Square, Monmouth. The man turned up expecting to see his potential wife and stayed for three hours while being laughed at by a local crowd of people before returning home on the last train.

Celebrations on 30 April 1890 for the birthday of John Maclean Rolls, son of John Rolls, later Lord Llangattock of The Hendre, saw the public roasting of an ox in the square, as part of a full day of celebrations. Tea and cake were provided to local children in their schools at 3:30pm. Public hog roasts took place in 1887 and 1897 to celebrate Queen Victoria's Golden and Diamond Jubilees.

On 29 October 1900, the then Duke and Duchess of York stopped in the square on their way to visit the Llangattock and Rolls family at the Hendre. The visit was a private one and as such the official welcome in the square was very brief. The couple were in mourning at the time for Prince Christian Victor. The Duke and Duchess later became King George V and Queen Mary.

The unveiling of the Rolls Memorial and Statue, to commemorate Charles Rolls, took place on 19 October 1911. On 18 July 1919 the square hosted a parade that was the start of two days of Peace celebrations following the end of the Great War.

== Recent activities ==
A market is held under the arches of the Shire Hall on Fridays and Saturdays, with a farmers market on the second Wednesday of each month and occasional craft markets during the year. Monmouth Festival was held in the square from 1982 until 2008, when the venue was changed to the old cattle market at Blestium Street.

== Notable buildings and structures ==
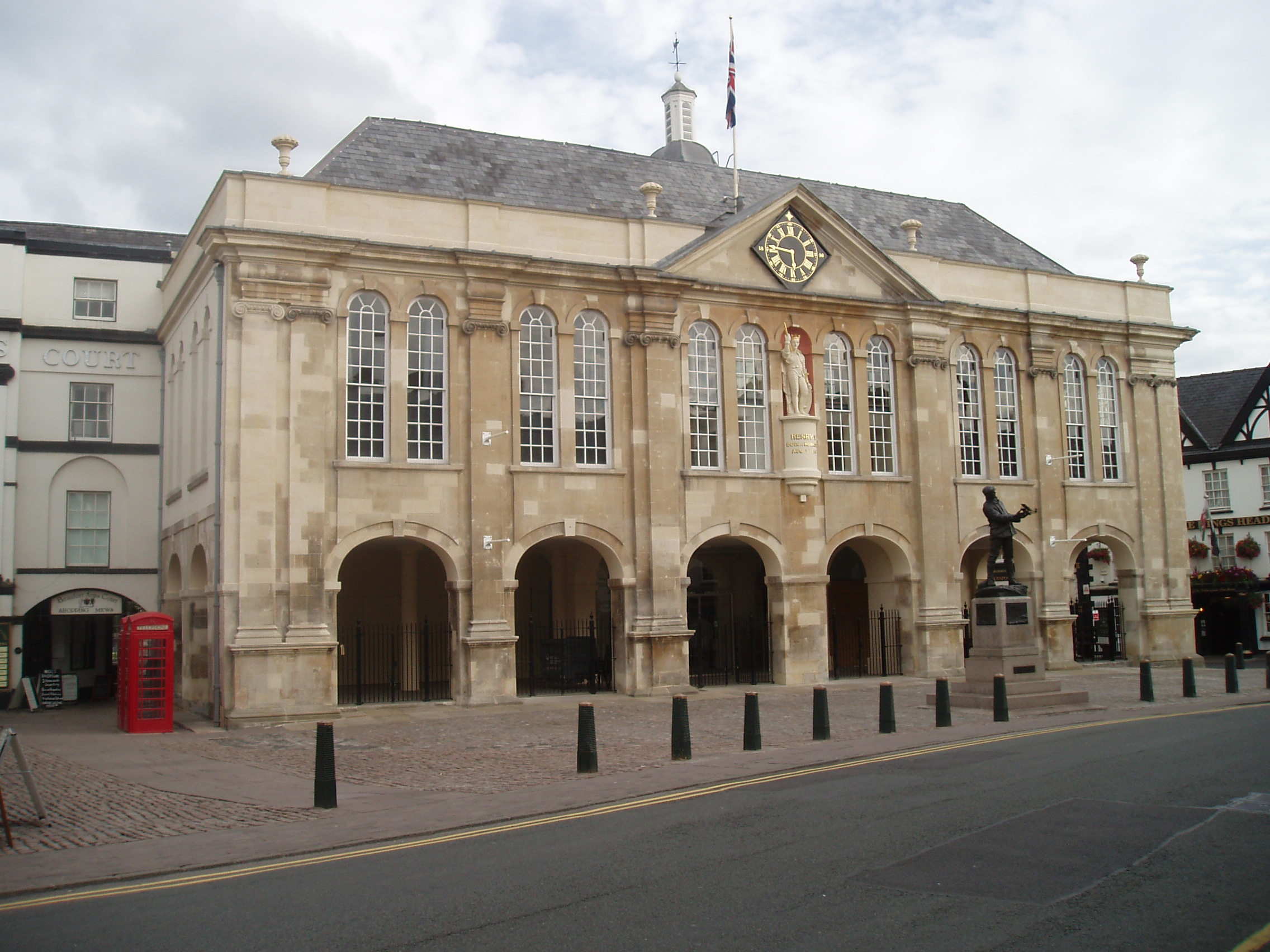
The Shire Hall, built in 1724, dominates Agincourt Square

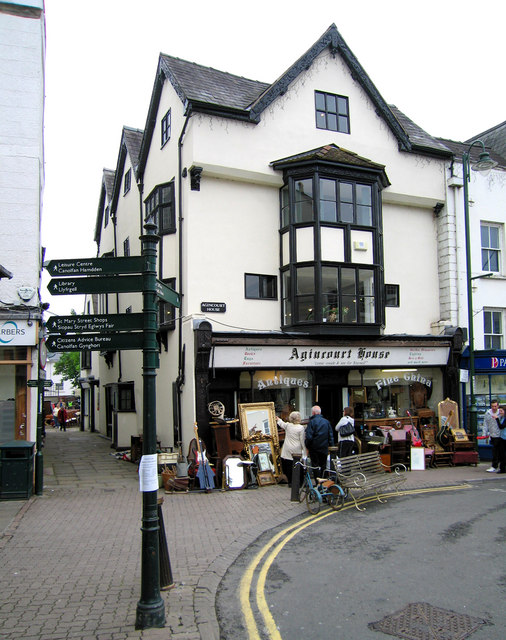
No. 1 Agincourt Square, Agincourt House

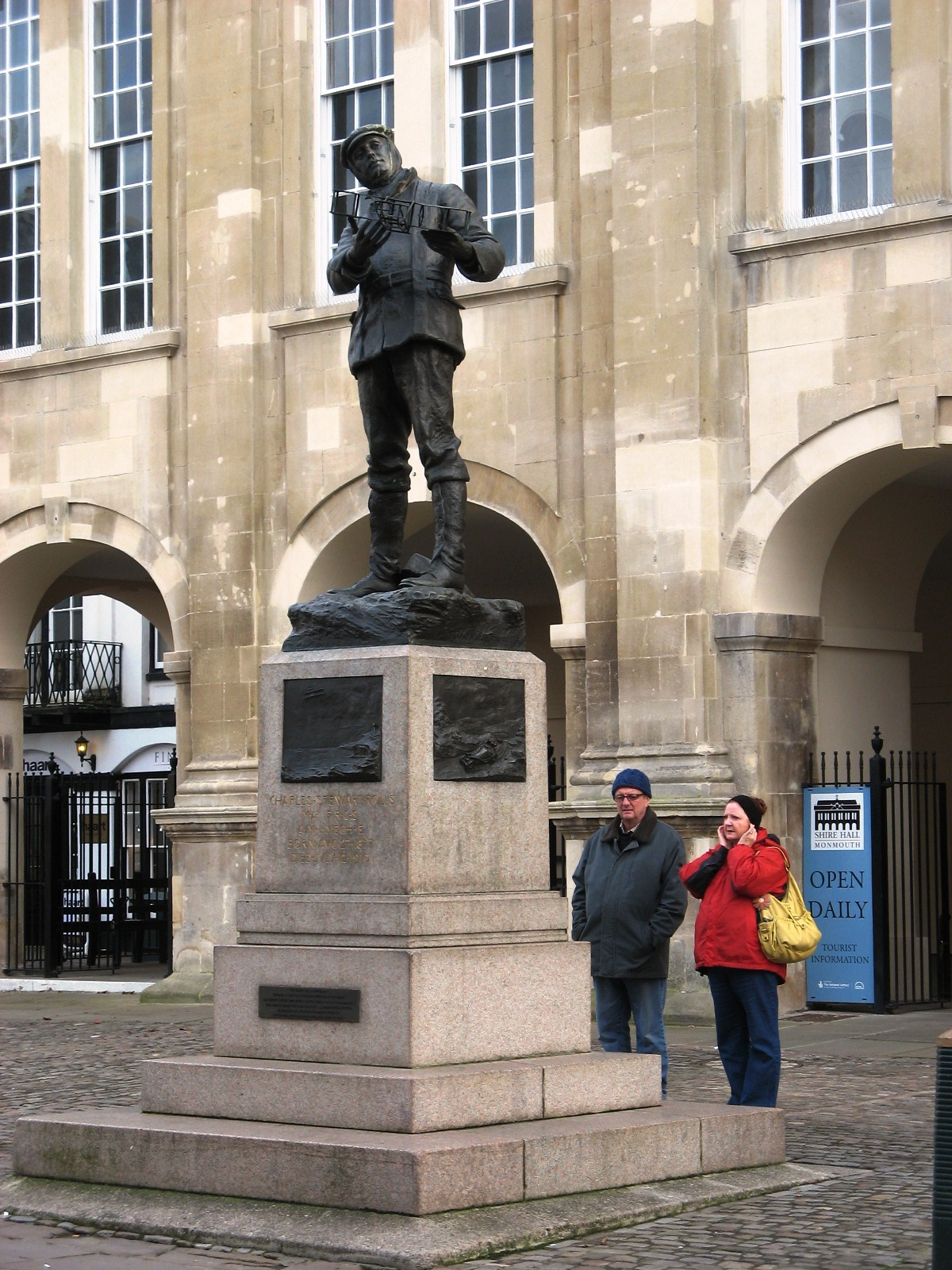
Statue of Charles Rolls

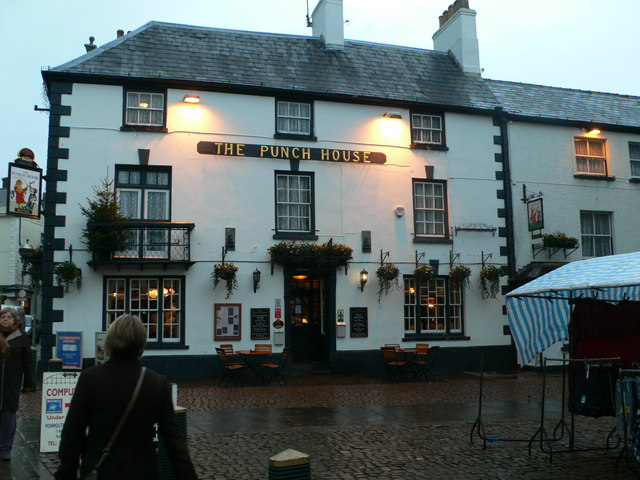
The Punch House

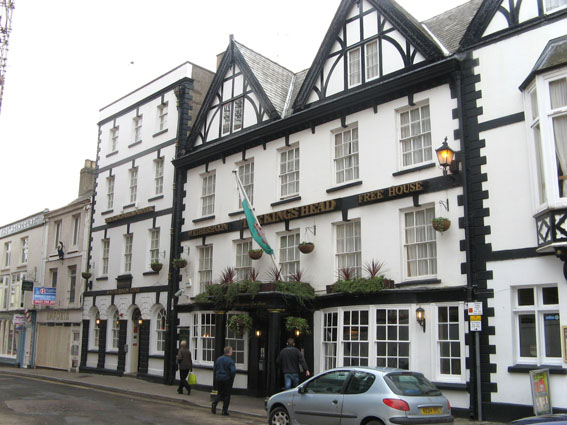
Kings Head Hotel

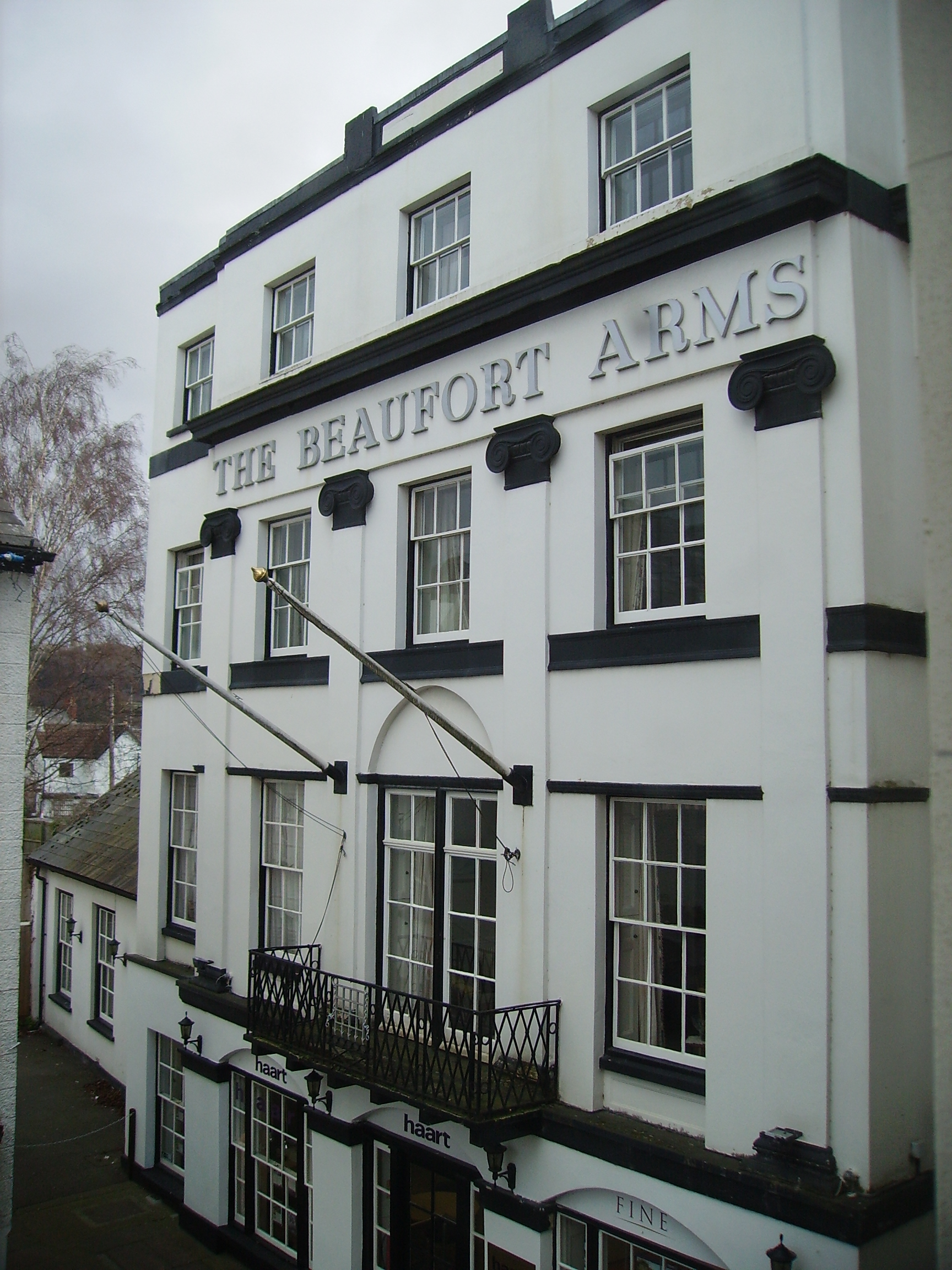
The Beaufort Arms Hotel

== Gallery ==
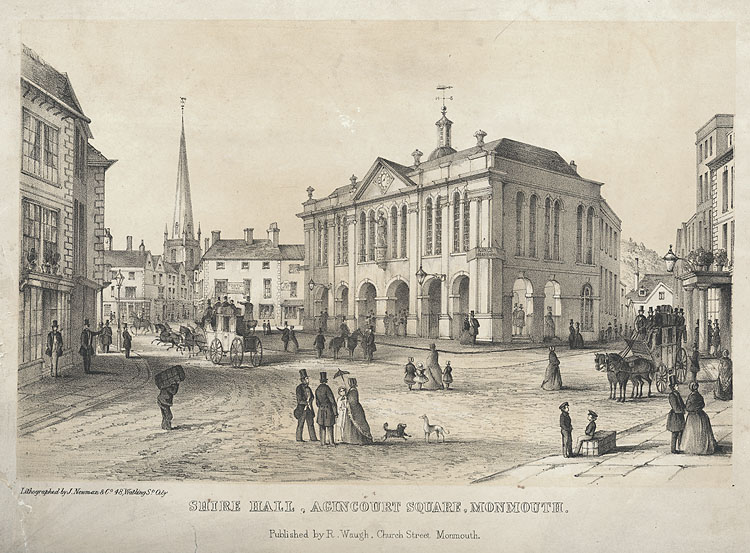
A street scene by R. Waugh; tinted lithograph; 1860

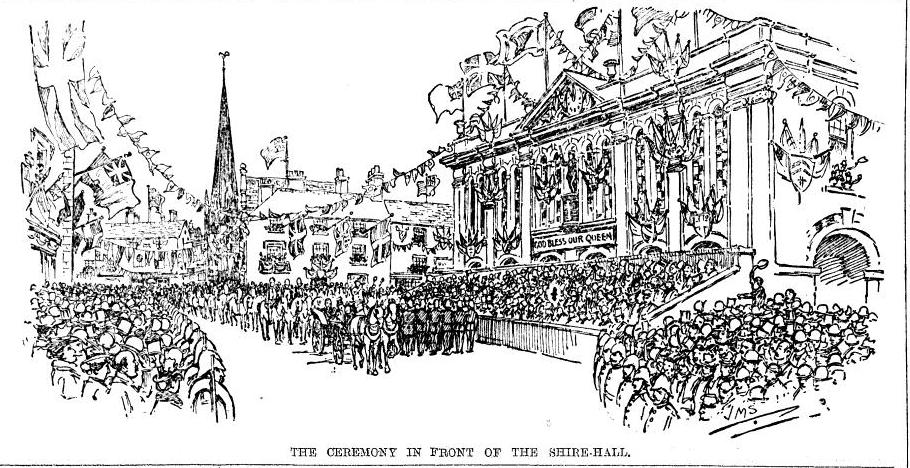
Sketch in Western Mail, Tuesday, 30 October 1900, of Agincourt Square and Shire Hall

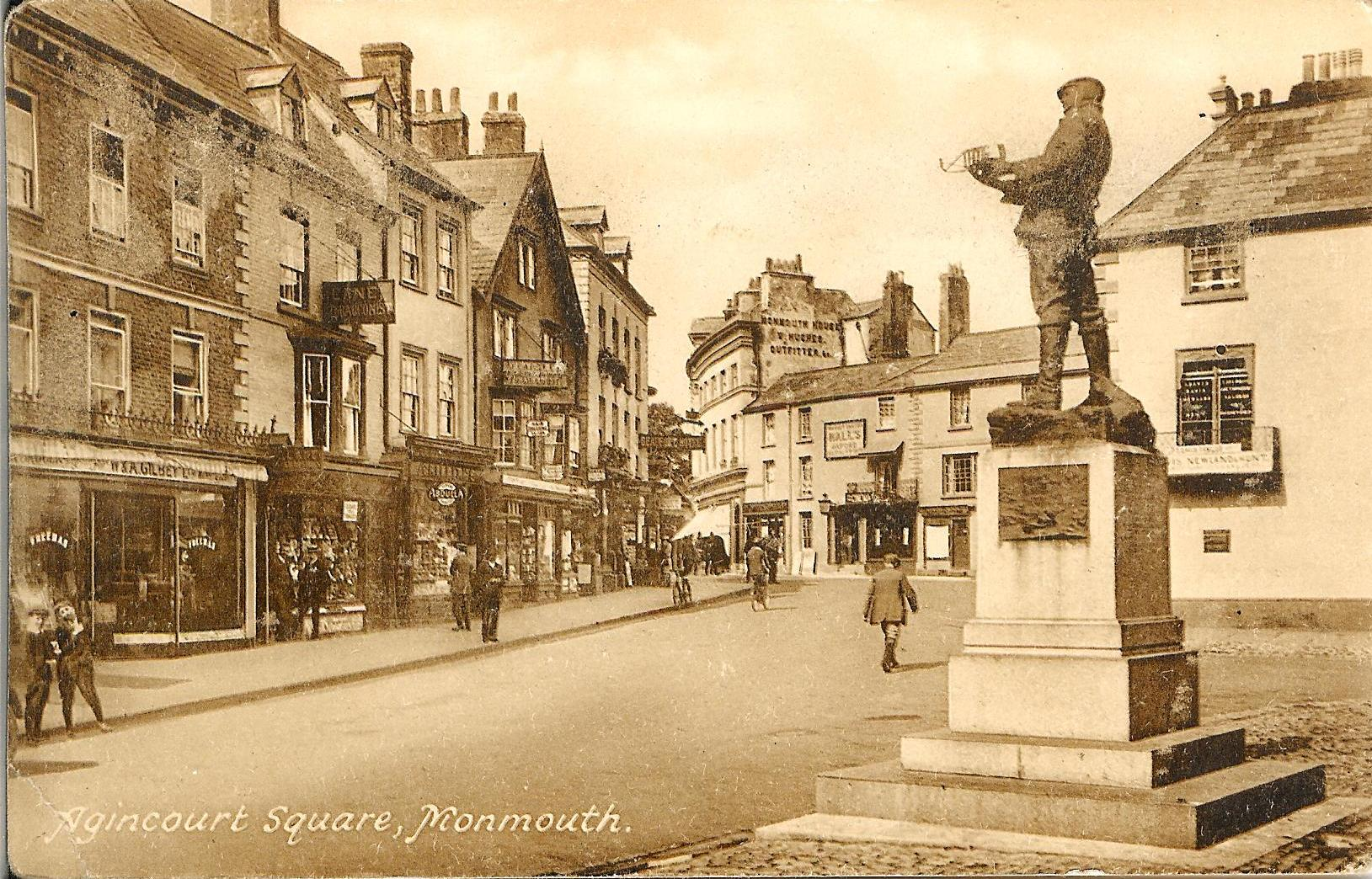
Statue of Charles Rolls, Monmouth, 1910s

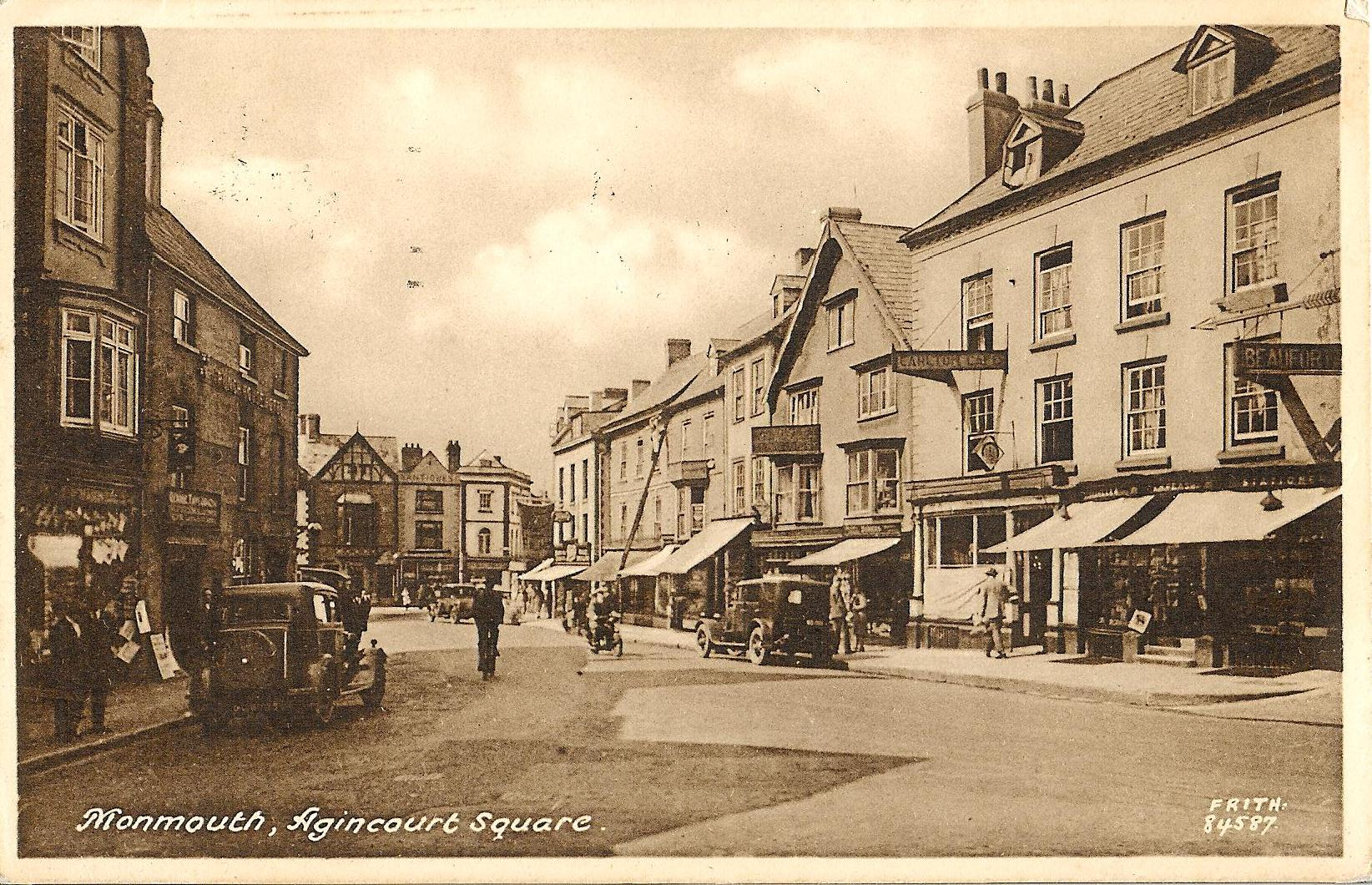
The square in 1940, with Agincourt House on the left

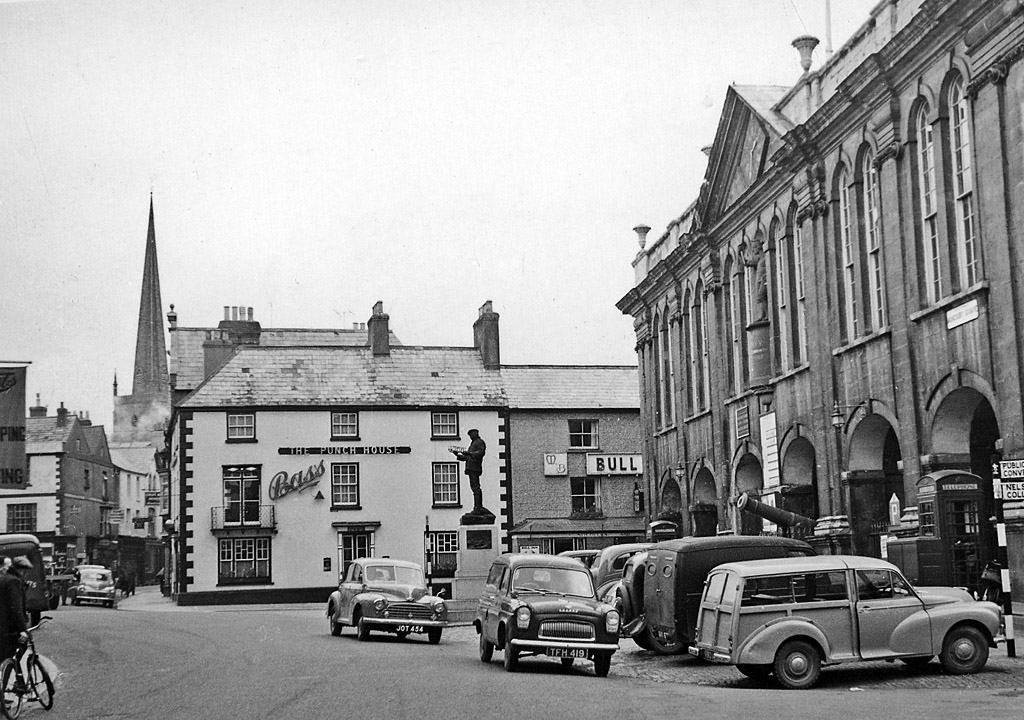
The square in 1958, looking towards the northeast

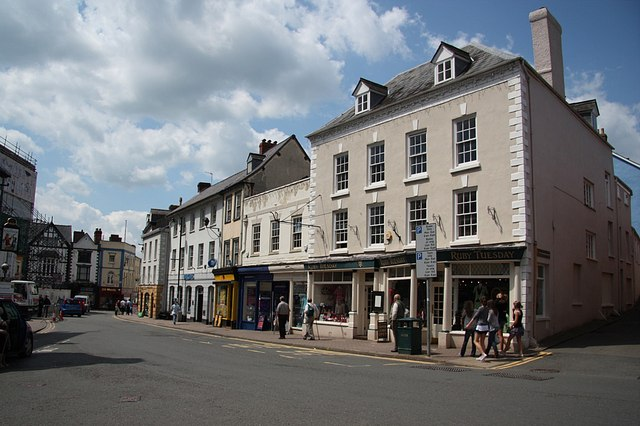
Shops on the north side of Agincourt Square

Choir singing in Agincourt Square as part of the 2012 Olympic torch relay
