= Punch House, Monmouth =

The Punch House
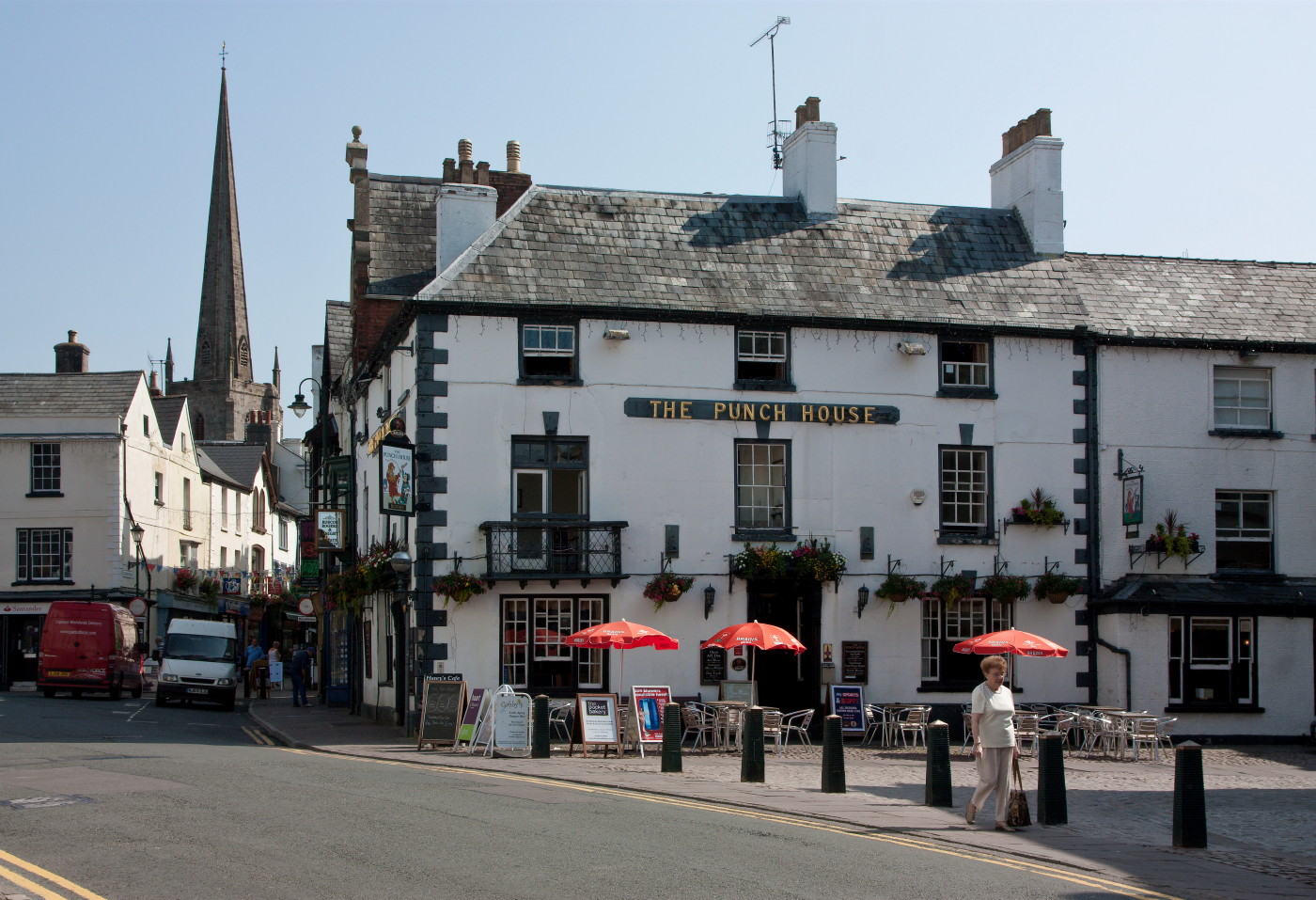
- Interactive map of the The Punch House area

General information
- Type: Public House
- Location: Agincourt Square, Monmouth, Wales
- Coordinates: 51.812216°N 2.715311°W

Design and construction
- Designations: Grade II listed building

Website
- www.thepunchhousemonmouth.co.uk

The Punch House is a public house and hotel located at Agincourt Square, Monmouth, Wales.

== History ==
The Punch House was originally a coaching inn called The Wine Vaults. Records show the pub was in existence in 1769. The pub was known as The Punch House from around 1832 but did not change to The Punch House officially until 1896. In 1822 the licensee was John Powell. While in the possession of the Powell family, the business also traded as a wines and spirits merchant. The pub that stands today was originally two pubs until the late 1990s. At that date the Punch House was extended to include The Bull public house which occupied the adjoining premises. The Bull itself was originally known as The Black Bull in the 1800s. The internal door which now unites the two lounges downstairs is said to be the door of Monmouth County Gaol.

The building has been a Grade II listed building since 15 August 1974. It has a stucco frontage with chamfered quoins and a half hipped Welsh slate roof. The elevation is continuous with that of the Bull Inn which has a slightly lower roofline.

The Punch House is one of the pubs in Agincourt Square who started using QRpedia codes as part of the MonmouthpediA project in March 2012. Formerly owned by Brains Brewery, it was acquired by the Valiant Pub Company in December 2021.

== Gallery ==
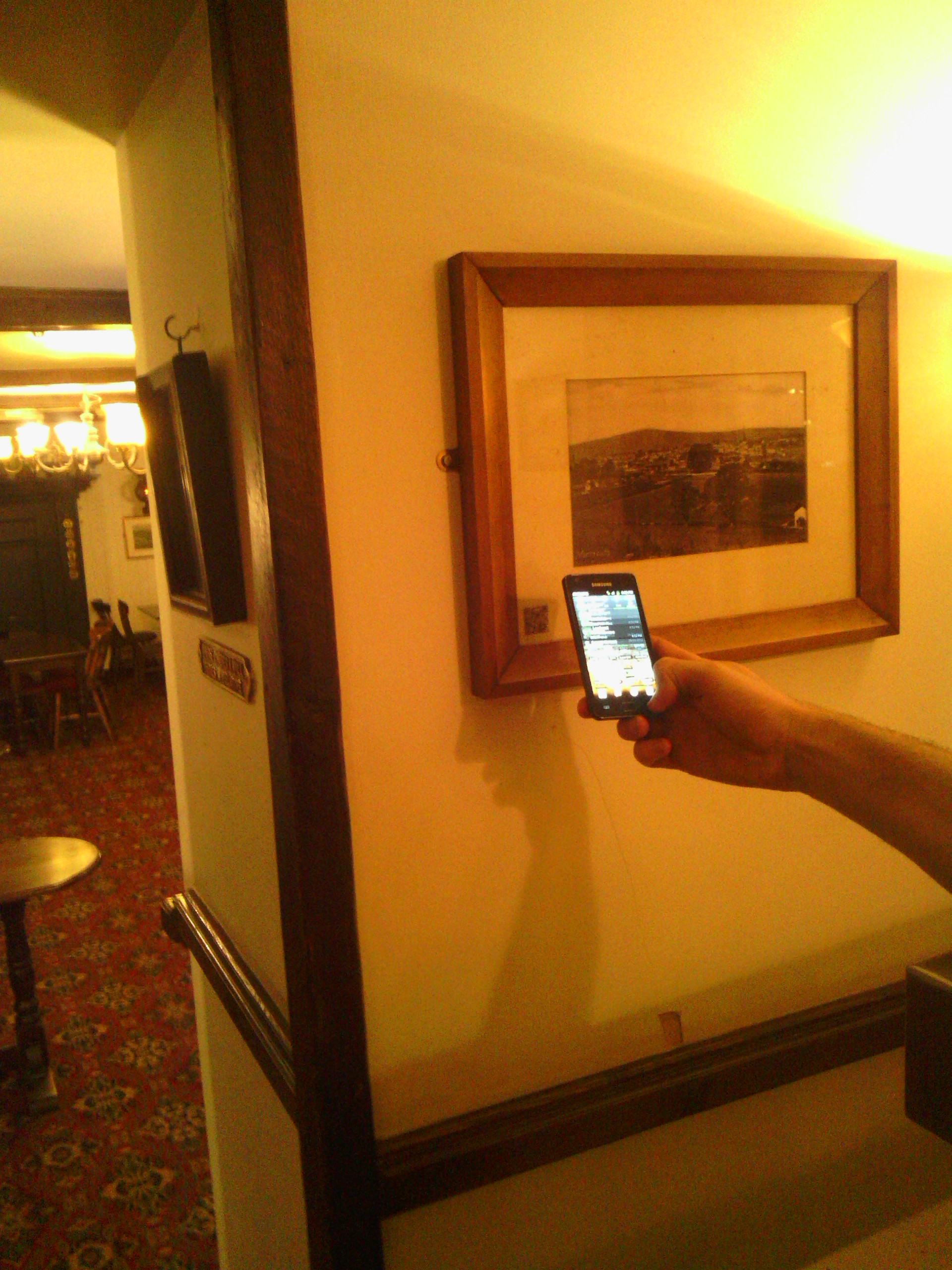
A picture with QR code for MonmouthpediA

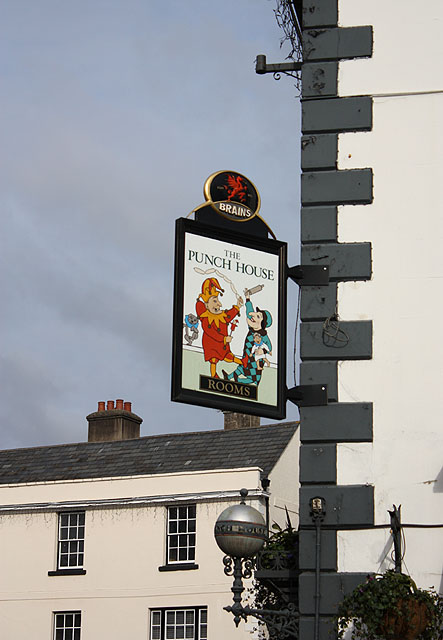
Punch House sign

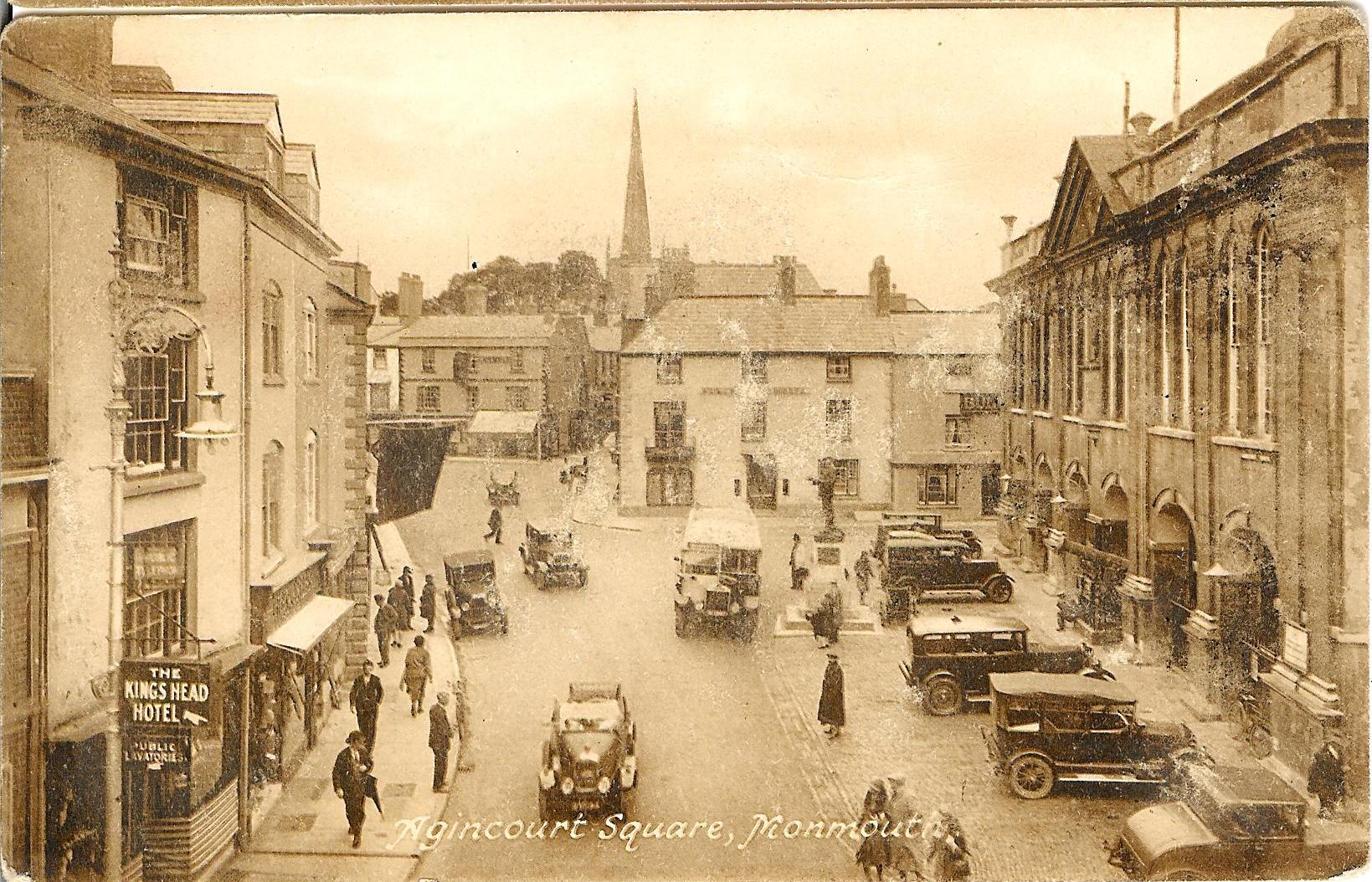
Agincourt Square in the 1930s showing the Punch House at the centre

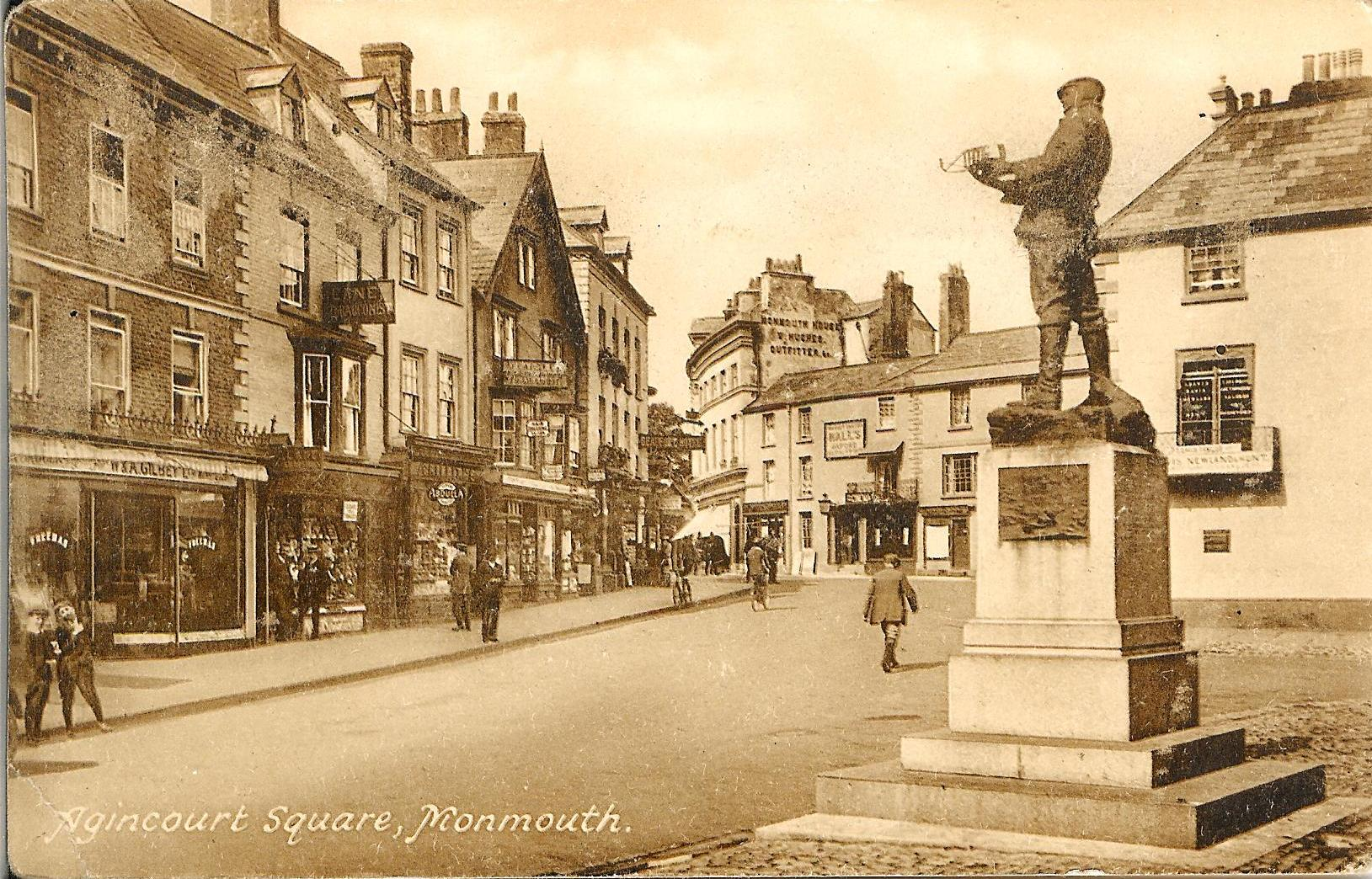
Punch house shown on the right of the Rolls Statue. The picture taken in 1910 also shows a plain wall where a window is now.
