= Statue of Charles Rolls, Monmouth =

Statue by William Goscombe John

Statue of Charles Rolls
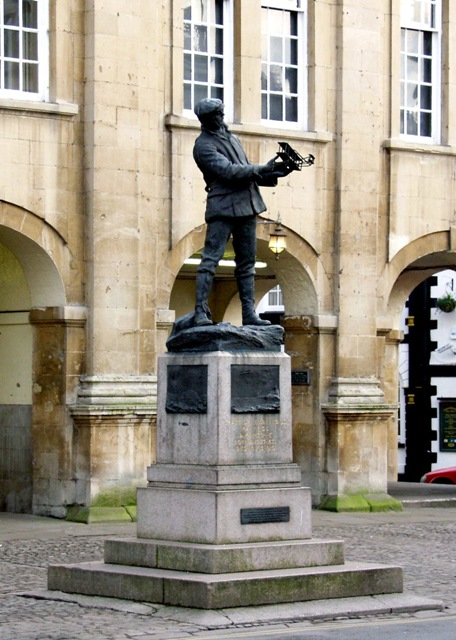
- The statue is in front of Monmouth's Shire Hall
- Artist: Sir William Goscombe John, R.A.
- Year: 19 October 1911
- Medium: Bronze
- Dimensions: 2.4 m (8 ft)
- Location: Agincourt Square, Monmouth; 51°48′43.36″N 2°42′56.27″W

Listed Building – Grade II*
- Official name: Statue of C S Rolls
- Designated: 15 August 1974
- Reference no.: 2229

A memorial statue to the aviation pioneer Charles Rolls stands in front of the Shire Hall in Agincourt Square, Monmouth, Wales. The 8 feet (2.4 m) high bronze statue was designed by Sir William Goscombe John, R.A. and Sir Aston Webb, R.A. designed the pink granite plinth. The statue is a Grade II* listed structure.

Charles Stewart Rolls was the third son of John Rolls, 1st Baron Llangattock, and his family home was The Hendre to the north of the town, where Sir Aston also designed the Cedar Library. The Rolls family were significant landowners in the nineteenth century and major benefactors to the town and county. The statue was proposed by the Borough Council in June 1910, to celebrate Charles Rolls's two-way crossing of the English Channel. However, Rolls was killed in an accident at an airfield near Bournemouth on the south coast of England the following month. The statue and plaques around the plinth therefore commemorate his life achievements.

The statue was cast by A. B. Burton at the Thames Ditton Foundry, which produced many bronze statues around the world, including the statue of Eros in Piccadilly Circus, and the 38-ton "Peace Quadriga" on Wellington Arch at Hyde Park Corner, London. It was unveiled on 19 October 1911, by Colonel Lord Raglan, C.B., accompanied by a large gathering of dignitaries and the public. Rolls is seen inspecting a purposely incomplete model of his biplane. The tail plane is the missing element on the model, alluding to the cause of the accident which killed Rolls. Shortly before the fatal flight, the tail plane was modified in an attempt to improve control.

The main dedication is all in upper case and reads:

Erected by public subscription to the memory of the Honourable Charles Stewart Rolls, third son of Lord and Lady Llangattock as a tribute of admiration for his great achievements in motoring ballooning and aviation. He was a pioneer in both scientific and practical motoring and aviation and the first to fly across the channel from England to France and back without landing. He lost his life by the wrecking of his aeroplane at Bournemouth July 12, 1910. His death caused worldwide regret and deep national sorrow.

== Gallery ==
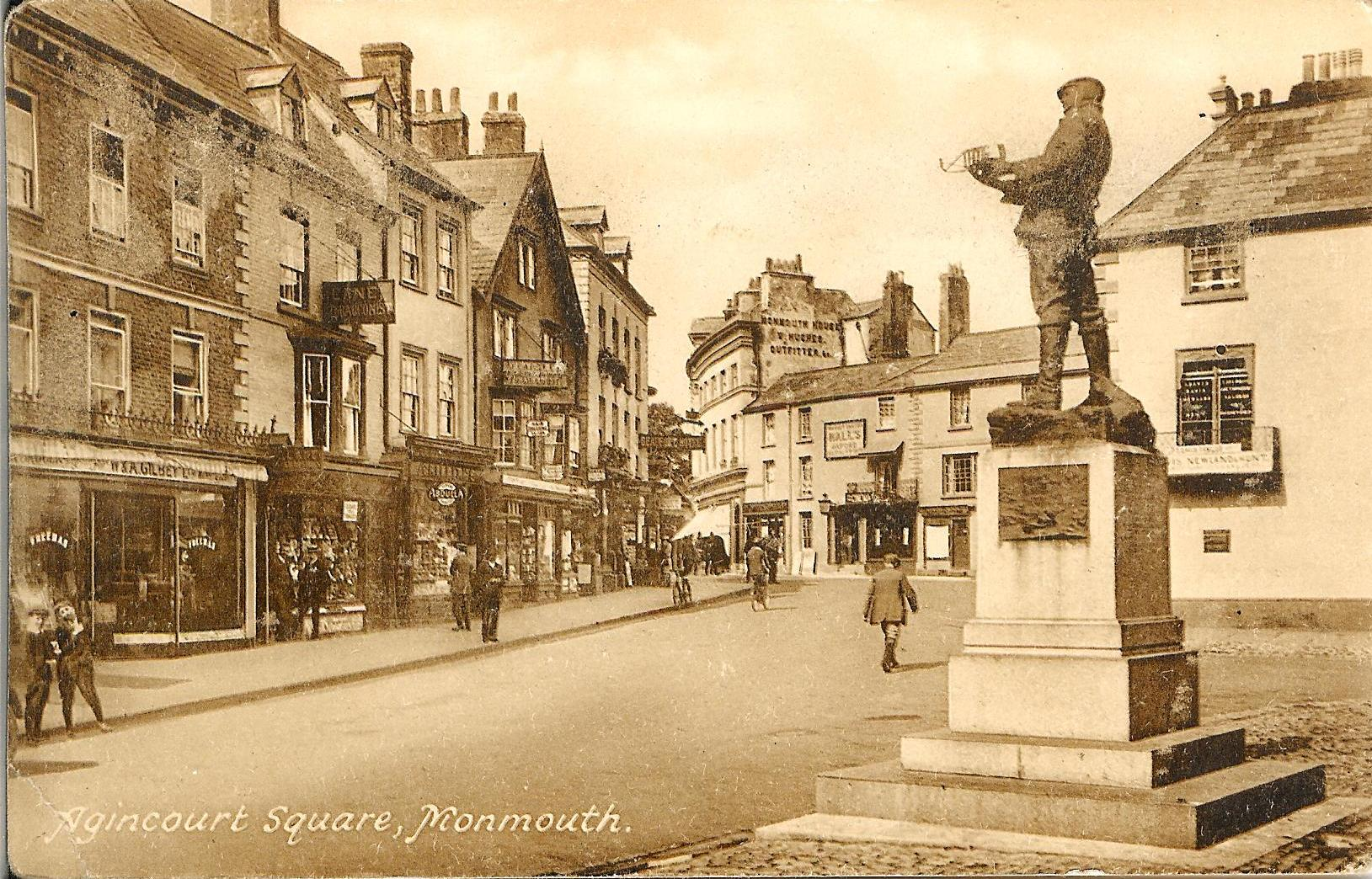
Statue of Charles Rolls, photograph from 1910s

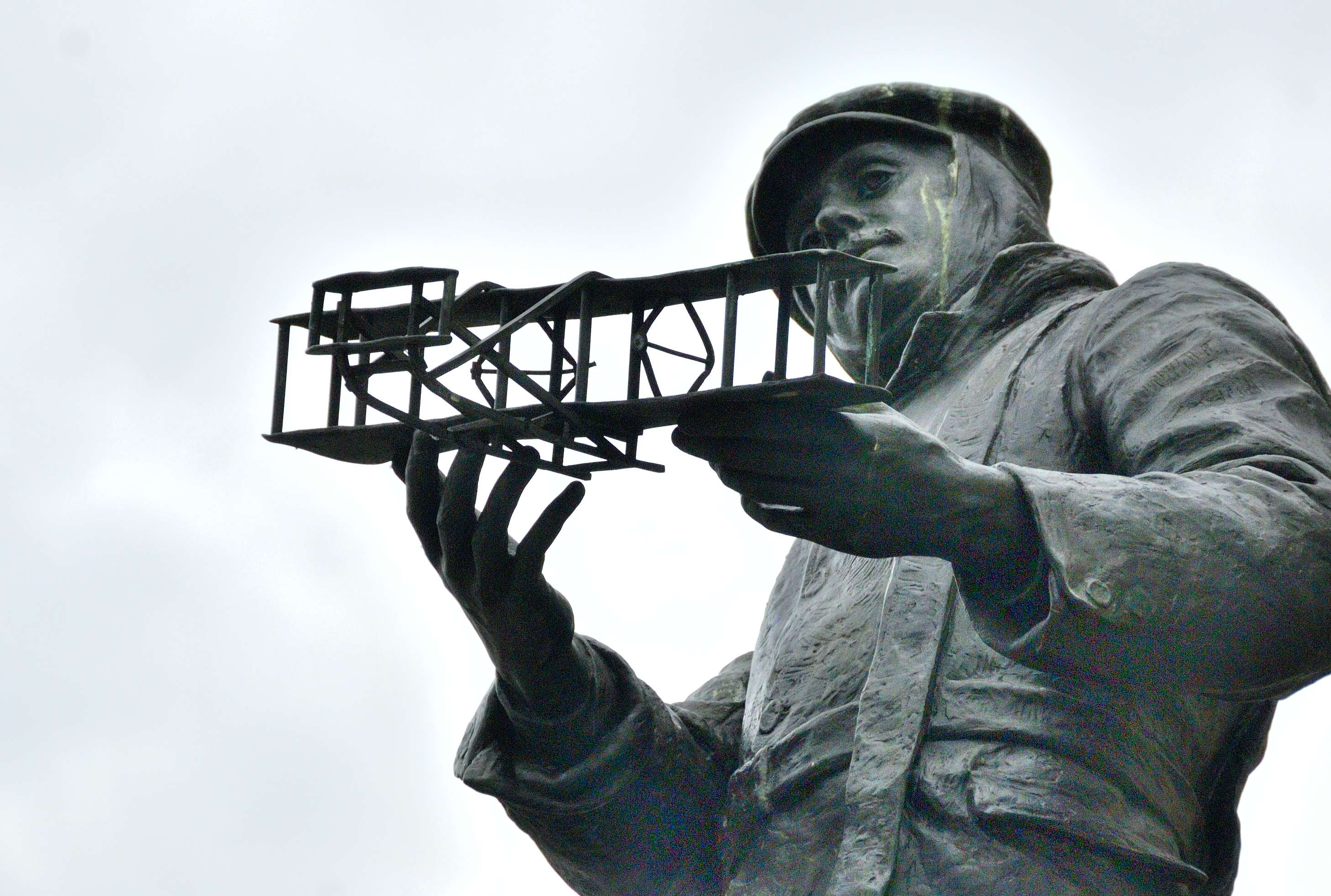
Close up

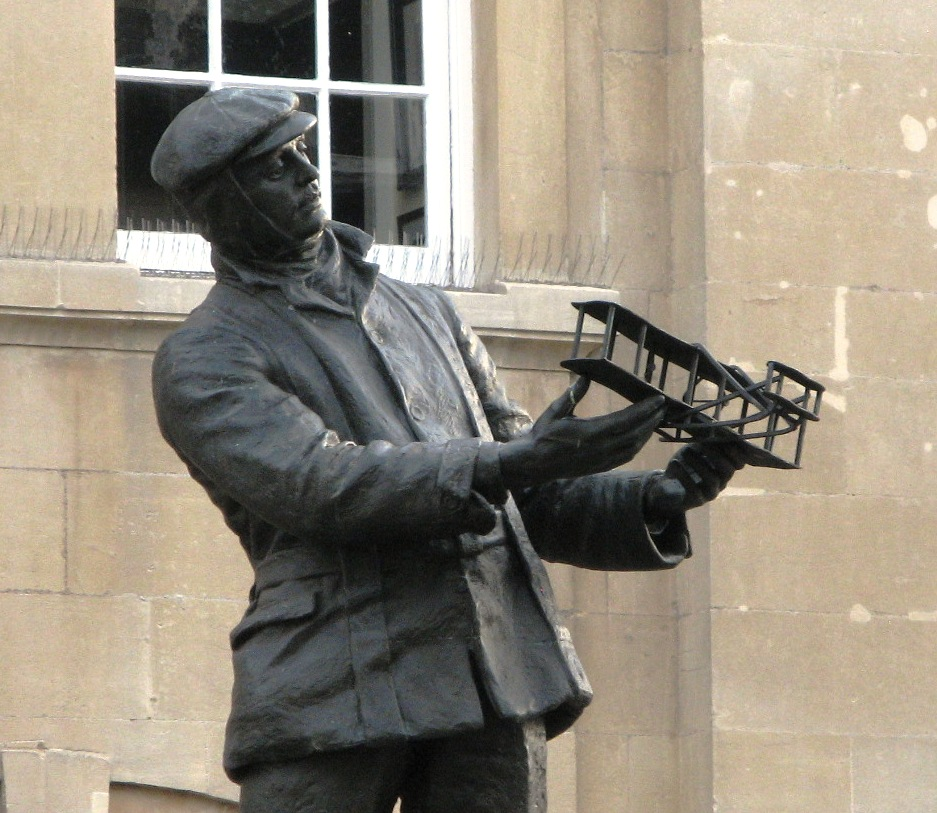
Rolls inspecting the Wright Flyer

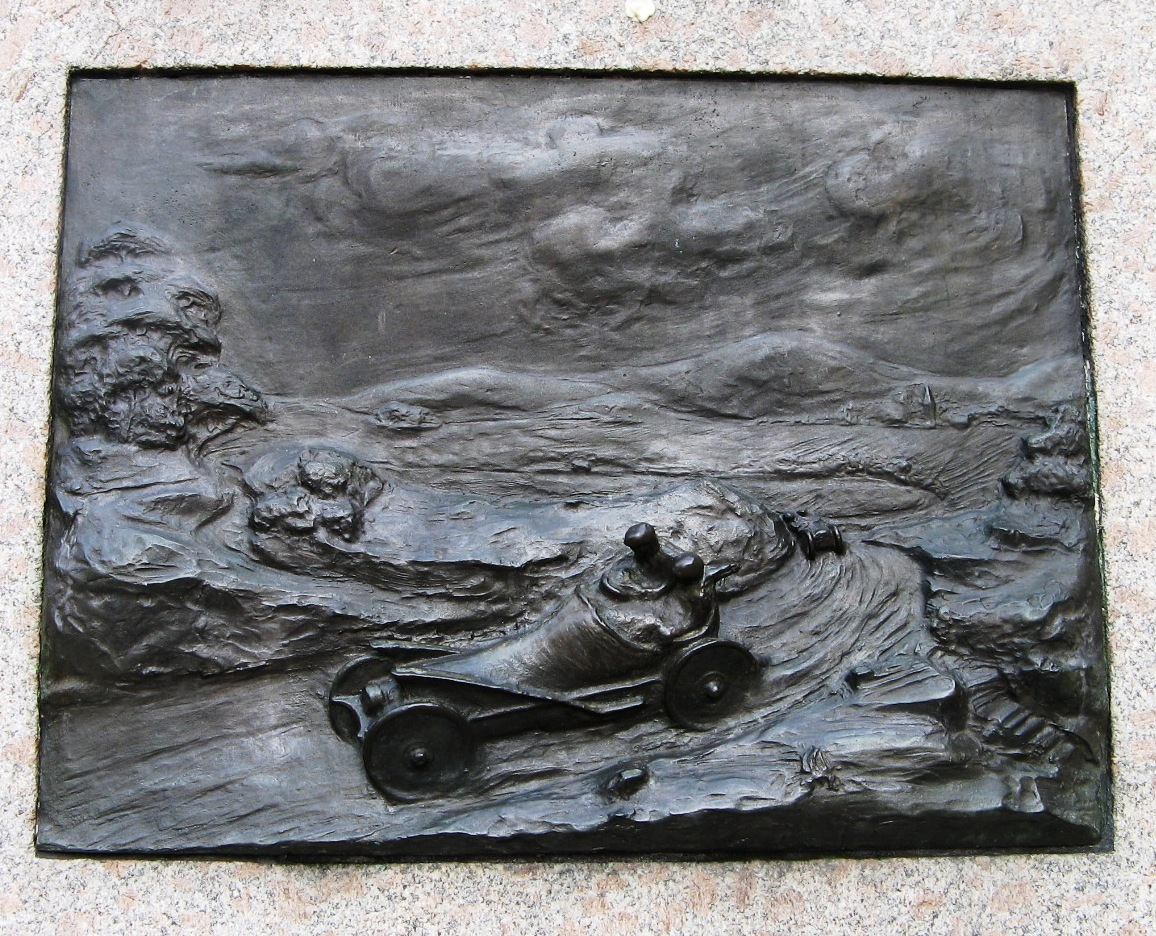
Plaque celebrating his enthusiasm for motor racing. (Bronze)

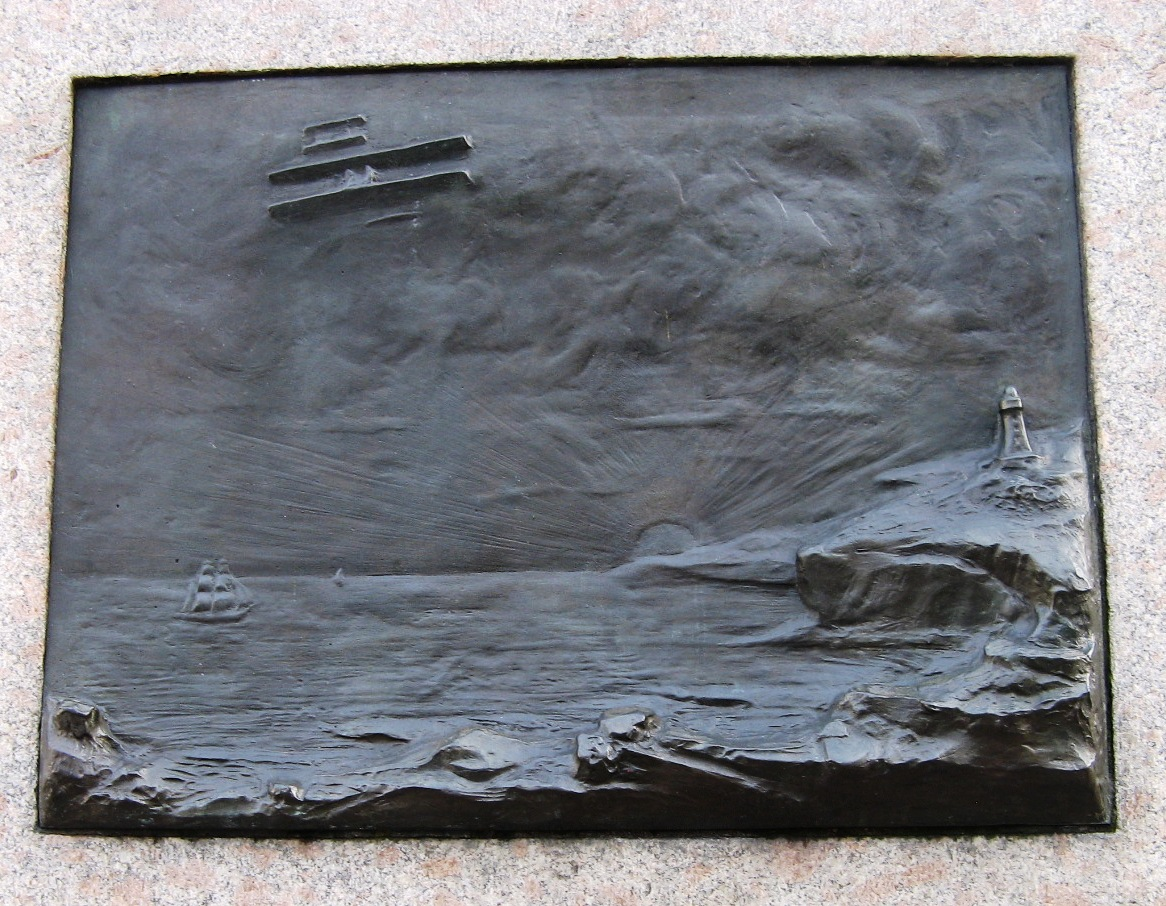
Plaque celebrating his Channel crossing. (Bronze)

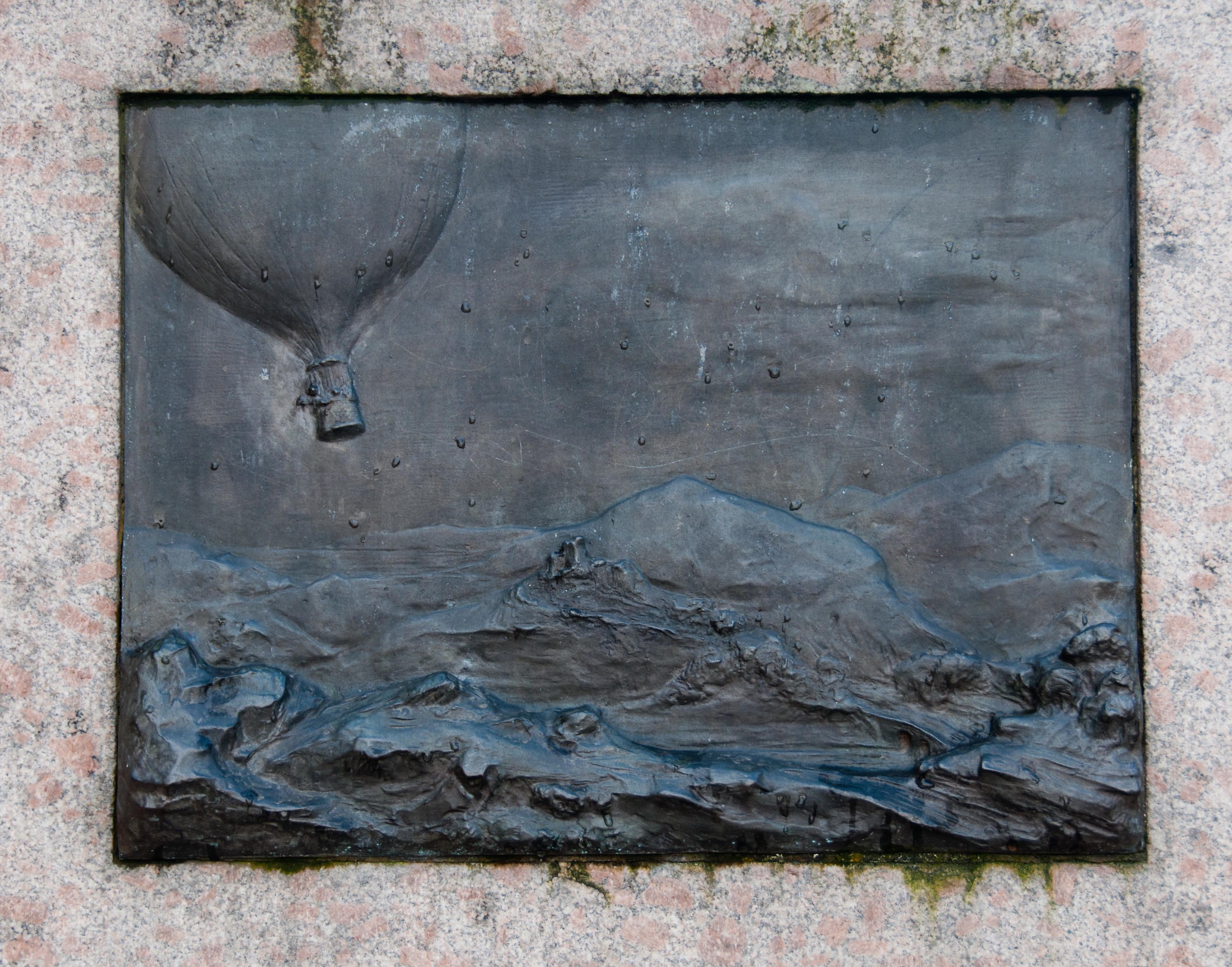
Plaque celebrating his enthusiasm for ballooning. (Bronze)

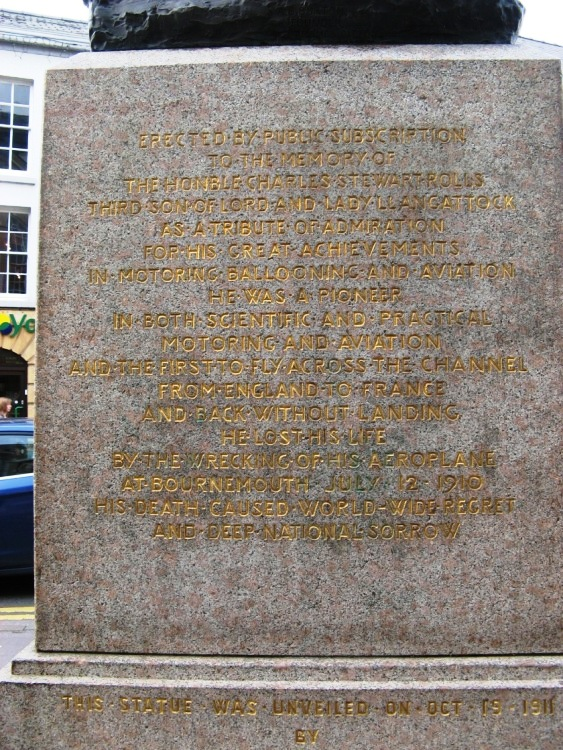
Dedication

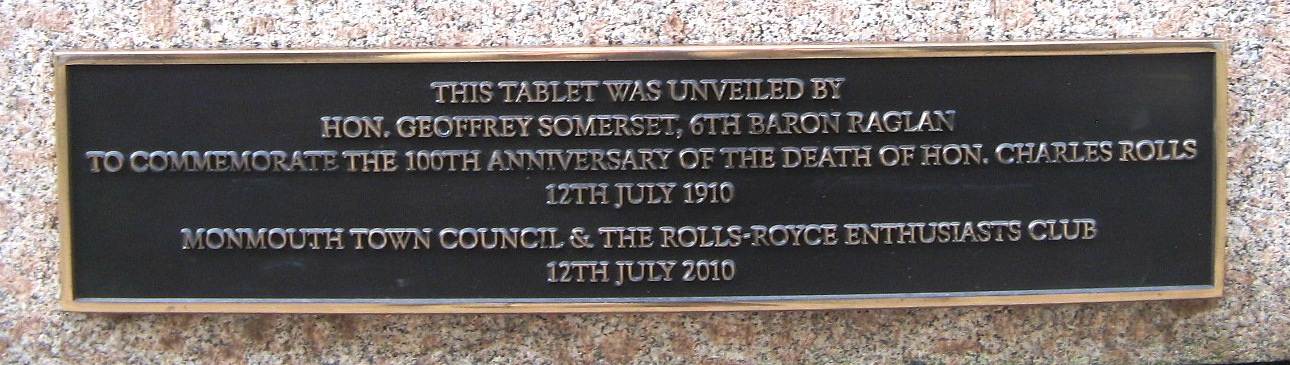
Rolls statue 2010 plaque

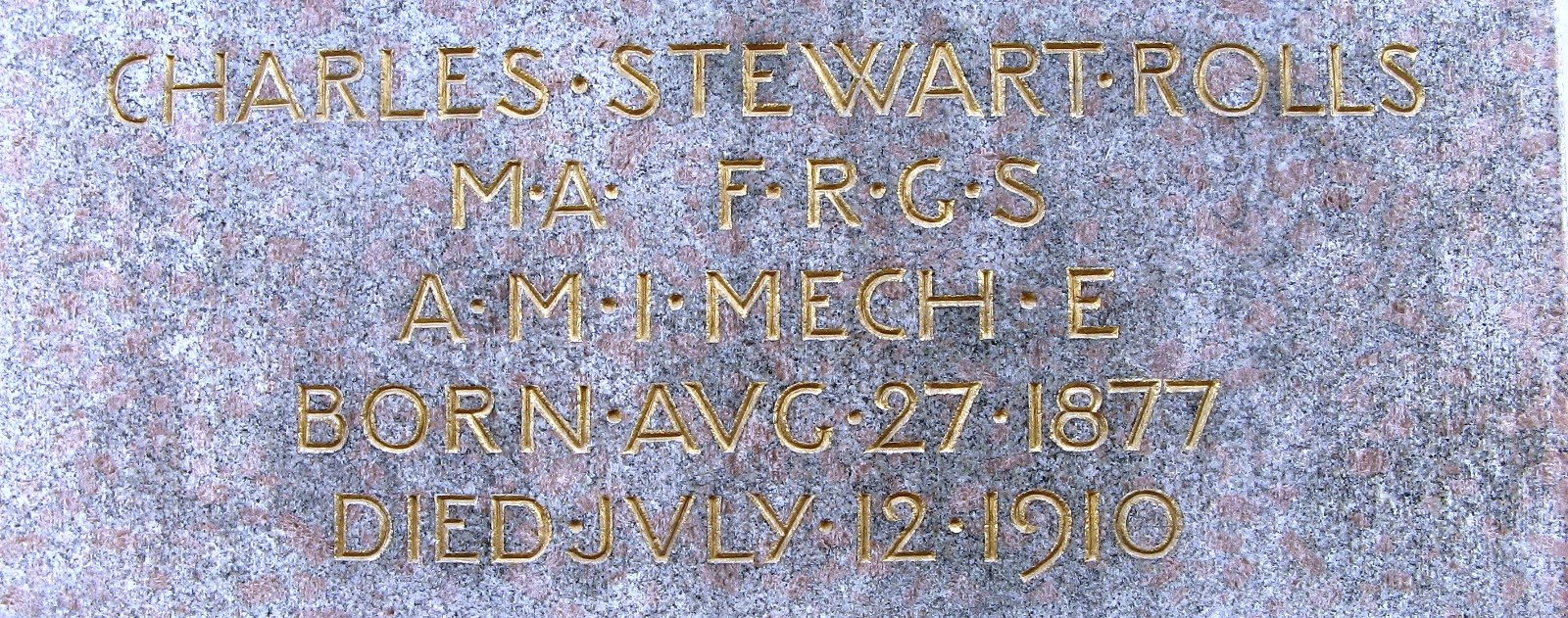
Statue Title

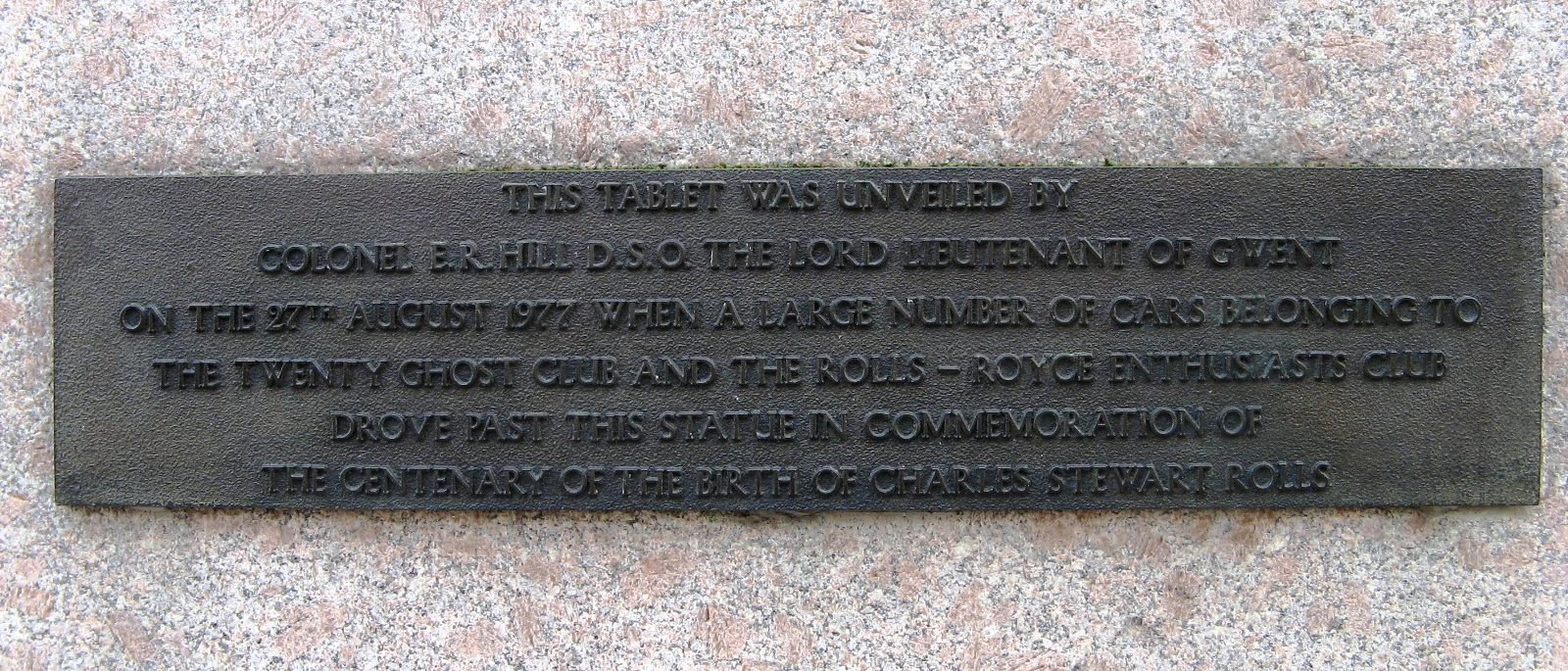
Rolls 1977 Plaque

== Sources ==
- Newman, John (2000). Gwent/Monmouthshire. The Buildings of Wales. Penguin. ISBN 0-14-071053-1.
