= Llangattock-Vibon-Avel =

Human settlement in Monmouthshire, Wales

Coordinates: 51.83726°N 2.78804°W

Llangattock-Vibon-Avel: Welsh: Llangatwg Feibion Afel
- Church of St Cadoc

- Location within Monmouthshire
- Population: 1,024 (2011)
- OS grid reference: SO458157
- Community: Whitecastle
- Principal area: Monmouthshire
- Preserved county: Gwent
- Country: Wales
- Sovereign state: United Kingdom
- Post town: MONMOUTH
- Postcode district: NP25
- Dialling code: 01600
- Police: Gwent
- Fire: South Wales
- Ambulance: Welsh
- UK Parliament: Monmouth

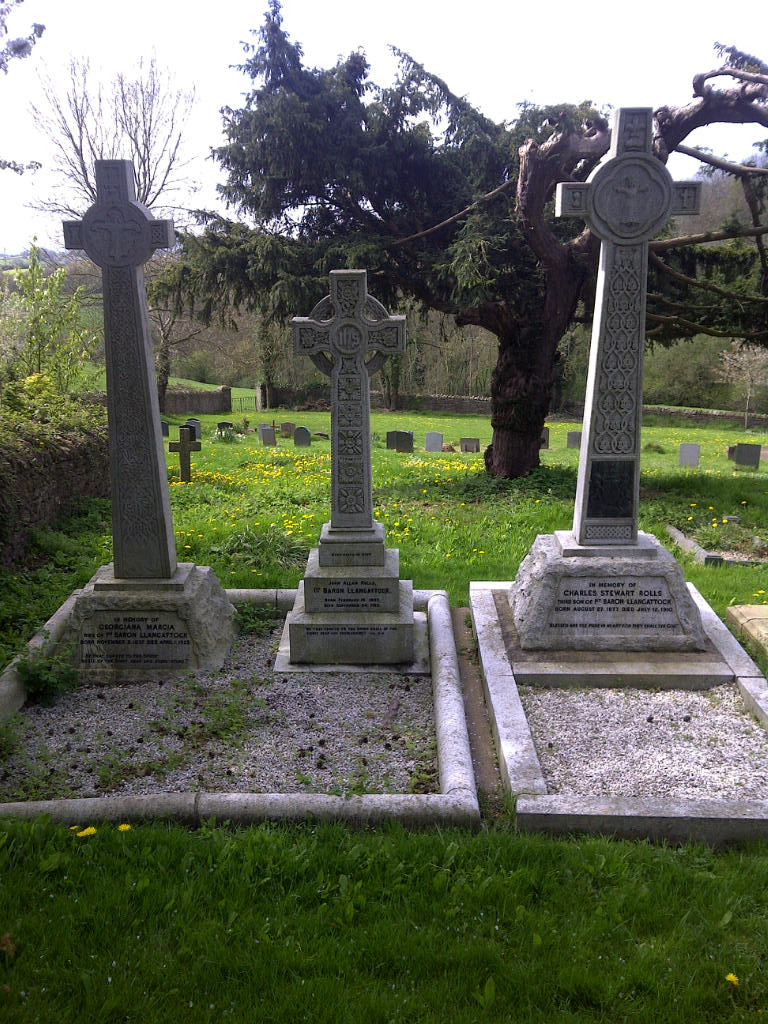
Graves of the Rolls family in St Cadoc's churchyard

Llangattock-Vibon-Avel (Welsh: Llangatwg Feibion Afel) is a rural parish and former community, now in the communities of Whitecastle and Skenfrith in Monmouthshire, south-east Wales, in the United Kingdom. It is located 5 miles (8.0 km) west of Monmouth and some 13 miles (21 km) east of Abergavenny, just off the B4233 old road between the two. Villages within the former community include Llangattock itself, Skenfrith, Rockfield, and Newcastle.

== Name ==
The name means, in Welsh, "Saint Cadoc's church, of the sons (Meibion) of Abel", the latter part to distinguish the village from others in the area with dedications to Cadoc, such as Llangattock Lingoed. The local form, in the dialect of south east Wales, would have been Llangatwg F'ib'on Afel.

== History and architecture ==
St Cadoc's Church is a Grade II* listed building which is of special interest for its association with the Rolls family of nearby The Hendre.

The church has a 15th-century porch tower, but the rest of the building dates from the 19th century. A reconstruction was undertaken first in 1852–53 and then again in 1875 by Thomas Henry Wyatt. The church is constructed of old red sandstone rubble, with roofing in red clay tiles. The interior contains stained glass by Charles Eamer Kempe.

The quiet south-facing graveyard contains five memorial tombs to members of the Rolls family, including Charles Rolls, of Rolls-Royce fame. The churchyard also contains a tall granite war memorial to men of the parish who fell in both World Wars.

Nearby Llangattock Manor was built on the site of an earlier house in 1877, for John Rolls, who later took the title of Baron Llangattock. It is also by Wyatt. Llangattock School, now known as Monmouth Montessori School, is a Montessori school and nursery housed in a school building commissioned by John Rolls at the same time as the manor house, for the children of workers on the family's estate. The Rolls of Monmouth golf club is based nearby at The Hendre.

== Llanfaenor ==
Two miles (3.2 km) to the northwest of the village, at Llanfaenor, is a chapel of ease which was restored in 1859. It has a chancel, nave, south porch and a western turret with one small bell. Originally it could accommodate a seated congregation of 80.
