= St Cadoc's Church, Llangattock Vibon Avel =

Coordinates: 51.837°N 2.790°W

- Church of St Cadoc
- "a fine High Victorian rural church"

- Location in Monmouthshire
- Location: Llangattock Vibon Avel, Monmouthshire
- Country: Wales
- Denomination: Church in Wales

History
- Status: Parish church
- Founded: c.14th century

Architecture
- Functional status: Redundant
- Heritage designation: Grade II*
- Designated: 27 November 1953
- Architectural type: Church

The Church of St Cadoc, Llangattock Vibon Avel, Monmouthshire is a parish church of medieval origins which was heavily restored in the 19th century. The estate church of The Hendre, it is closely connected with the Rolls family and the grave of Charles Stewart Rolls, the motoring and aviation pioneer, is located in the churchyard. The church is a Grade II* listed building and is now in the care of the Friends of Friendless Churches.

== History ==
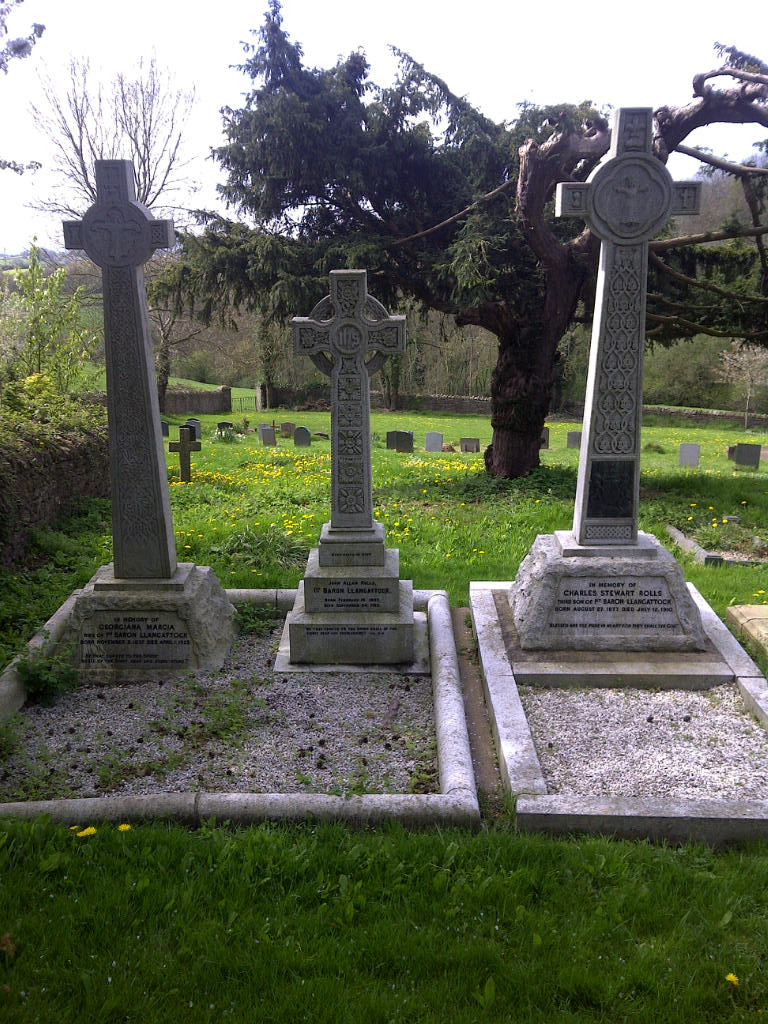
Graves of the Rolls family

The church is dedicated to St Cadoc and is of medieval origin. Early medieval charters describe the church as a clas; that is, a mother church served by a community of priests, with responsibilities for several subordinate churches in nearby villages. It was dedicated to the Welsh saint Cadoc by someone who admired, or knew, Cadoc, not necessarily by Cadoc himself. The first church was probably built of timber, wattle and daub, and was later rebuilt in stone.

The porch tower is all that now remains of the original stone church. The architectural historian John Newman considers the door is circa 1300 in date. In the 19th century, the church became the estate church for the Rolls family of The Hendre, later Barons Llangattock. During their time, the church was extensively restored, first by John Etherington Welch Rolls and subsequently by his son, John Rolls, 1st Baron Llangattock. On both occasions, the architect was Thomas Henry Wyatt. Between the two periods of renovation and rebuilding, a major decoration of the interior was undertaken. Lord Llangattock's eldest son, John Maclean, who inherited the title in 1912, was killed in 1916 and the title died with him. The grave of his younger brother, Charles Rolls, of Rolls-Royce fame, who predeceased him, dying in a plane crash in 1910, stands in the church's graveyard, beside the graves of their mother and father.

The church continued as an estate church until The Hendre was sold in the 1980s. It remained an active parish church until December 2020 when ownership was transferred to the Friends of Friendless Churches charity.

== Architecture and description ==
Apart from the 15th century porch tower, the entire building dates from the 19th century. The first reconstruction was undertaken in 1852–53 and the second in 1875. These works saw the construction of the nave and chancel in what Newman calls a "mixed Decorated and Perpendicular style". The church is constructed of old red sandstone rubble, with roofing in red clay tiles. The interior contains stained glass by Charles Eamer Kempe. (Note: The stained glass is to undergo restoration in 2023.) The church is Grade II* listed, the listing noting it as "a fine High Victorian rural church with a good interior, of special interest for its association with the Rolls family of The Hendre".
