= Charles Rolls =

British motoring and aviation pioneer (1877–1910)

The Honourable Charles Rolls FRGS FRMetS MICE
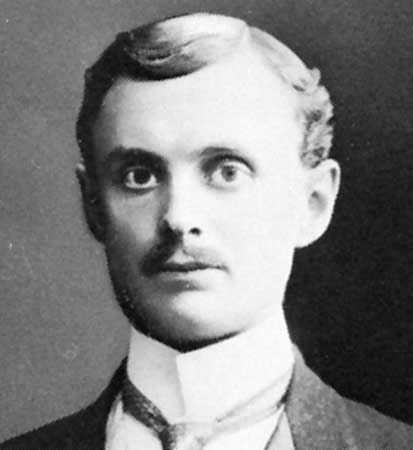
- Born: 27 August 1877; Berkeley Square, London, England
- Died: 12 July 1910 (aged 32); Southbourne, Bournemouth, England
- Cause of death: Air accident
- Education: Trinity College, Cambridge
- Occupations: Motor car promoter and aviator
- Known for: Co-founder, Rolls-Royce
- Parents: The 1st Baron Llangattock (father); Georgiana, Baroness Llangattock (mother)

Charles Stewart Rolls (27 August 1877 – 12 July 1910) was a British motoring and aviation pioneer. With Henry Royce, he co-founded the Rolls-Royce car manufacturing firm. He was the first Briton to be killed in an aeronautical accident with a powered aircraft, when the tail of his Wright Flyer broke off during a flying display in Bournemouth. He was aged 32.

== Early life ==
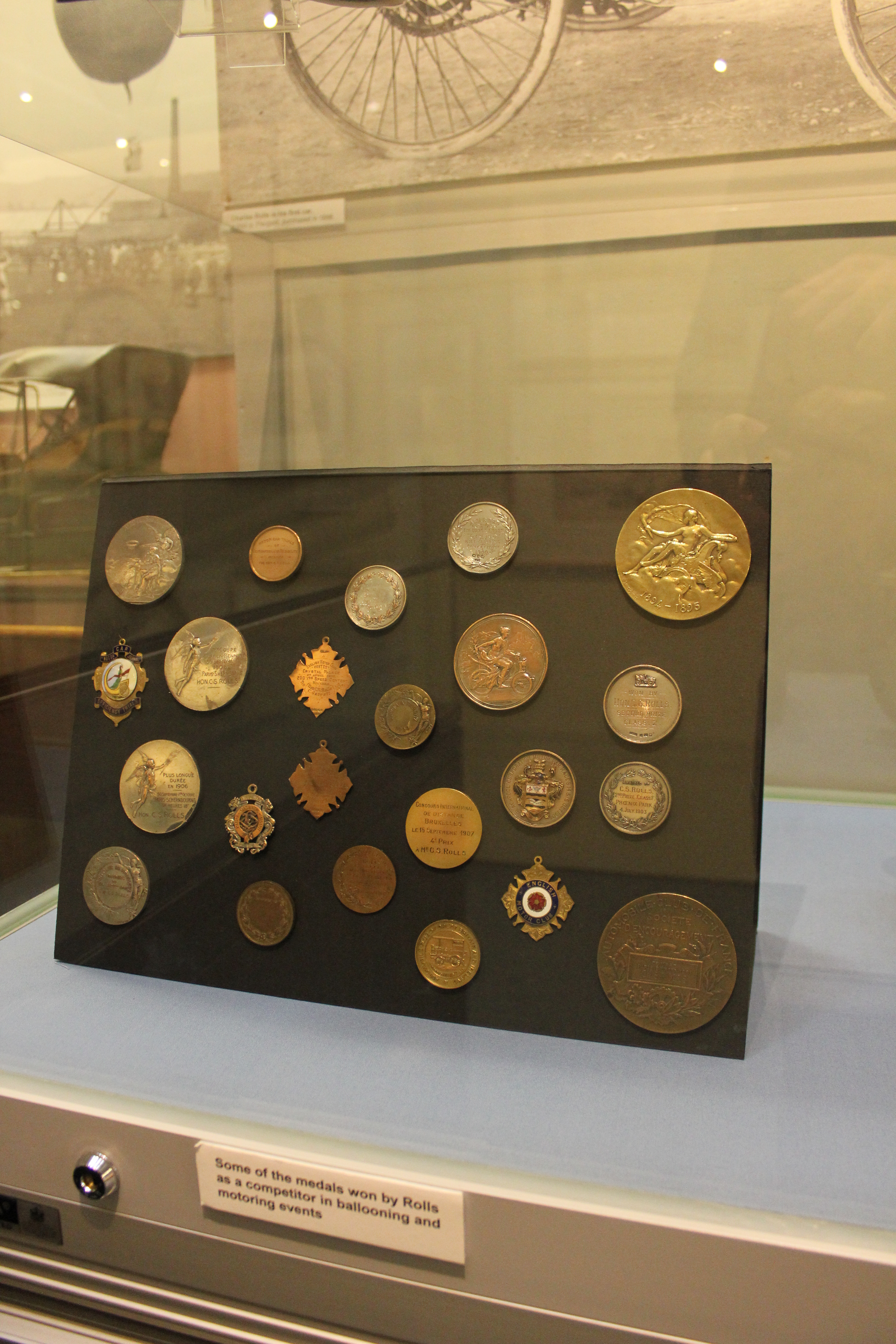
Medals won by Rolls in ballooning and motoring events. Monmouth Museum

Rolls was born in Berkeley Square, London, third son of the 1st Baron Llangattock of the Rolls family and Lady Llangattock. Despite his London birth, he retained a strong family connection with his ancestral home, The Hendre, a country house near Monmouth in Monmouthshire in the south-east of Wales. After attending Mortimer Vicarage Preparatory School in Berkshire, he was educated at Eton College where his developing interest in engines earned him the nickname "dirty Rolls". Although his father disliked his educational choices, Rolls persisted.

In 1894, he attended a private crammer in Cambridge which helped him gain entry to Trinity College, Cambridge, in 1895, where he studied mechanical and applied science. In 1896, at the age of 18, he travelled to Paris to buy his first car, a Peugeot Phaeton, and joined the Automobile Club of France. His Peugeot is believed to have been the first car based in Cambridge, and one of the first three cars owned in Wales. An early motoring enthusiast, he joined the Self-Propelled Traffic Association, which campaigned against the restrictions imposed on motor vehicles by the Locomotive Acts, and became a founder member of the Automobile Club of Great Britain, with which the Association merged in 1897.

Rolls was a keen cyclist and spent time at Cambridge bicycle racing. In 1896, he won a Half Blue and the following year became captain of the Cambridge University Bicycle Club.

Rolls graduated from Cambridge in 1898 and began working on the steam yacht Santa Maria followed by a position at the London and North Western Railway in Crewe. However, his talents lay more in salesmanship and motoring pioneering than practical engineering; in January 1903, with the help of £6,600 provided by his father, he started one of Britain's first car dealerships, C. S. Rolls & Co. based in Lillie Hall, Fulham, to import and sell French Peugeot and Belgian Minerva vehicles.

== Partnership with Royce ==
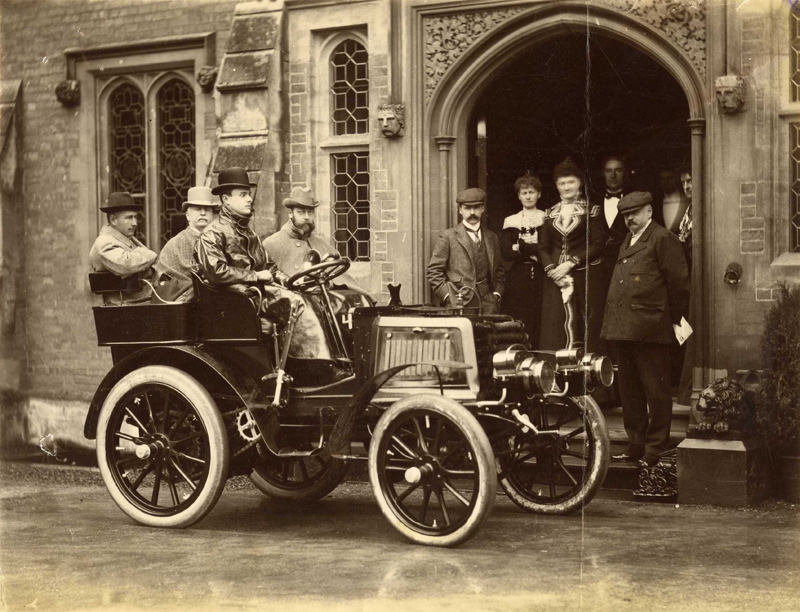
C. S. Rolls driving the Duke of York accompanied by Sir Charles Cust and Rolls' father, Lord Llangattock, at 'The Hendre', 1900

Rolls was introduced to Henry Royce by a friend at the Royal Automobile Club, Henry Edmunds, who was also a director of Royce Ltd. Edmunds showed him Royce's car and arranged the historic meeting between Rolls and Royce at the Midland Hotel, Manchester, on 4 May 1904. In spite of his preference for three or four cylinder cars, Rolls was impressed with the two-cylinder Royce 10 and in a subsequent agreement of 23 December 1904 agreed to take all the cars Royce could make. These would be of two, three, four and six cylinders and would be badged as Rolls-Royces.

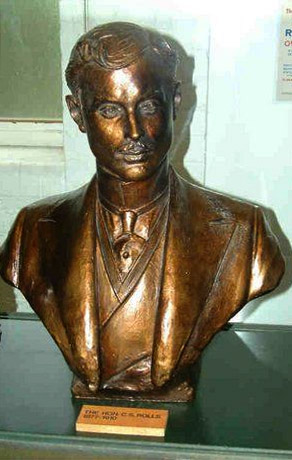
Bronze bust at Derby Industrial Museum

The first Rolls-Royce car, the Rolls-Royce 10 hp, was unveiled at the Paris Salon in December 1904, although in the early advertising it was the name of Rolls that was emphasised over that of Royce. In 1906 Rolls and Royce formalised their partnership by creating Rolls-Royce Limited, with Rolls appointed Technical Managing Director on a salary of £750 per annum plus 4% of the profits in excess of £10,000. Rolls provided the financial backing and business acumen to complement Royce's technical expertise. In 1907 Rolls-Royce Limited bought out C. S. Rolls & Co.

Rolls put much effort into publicising the quietness and smoothness of the Rolls-Royce, and at the end of 1906 travelled to the US to promote the new cars. The company was winning awards for the quality and reliability of its cars by 1907. But by 1909 Rolls' interest in the business was waning, and at the end of the year he resigned as Technical managing director and became a non-executive director.

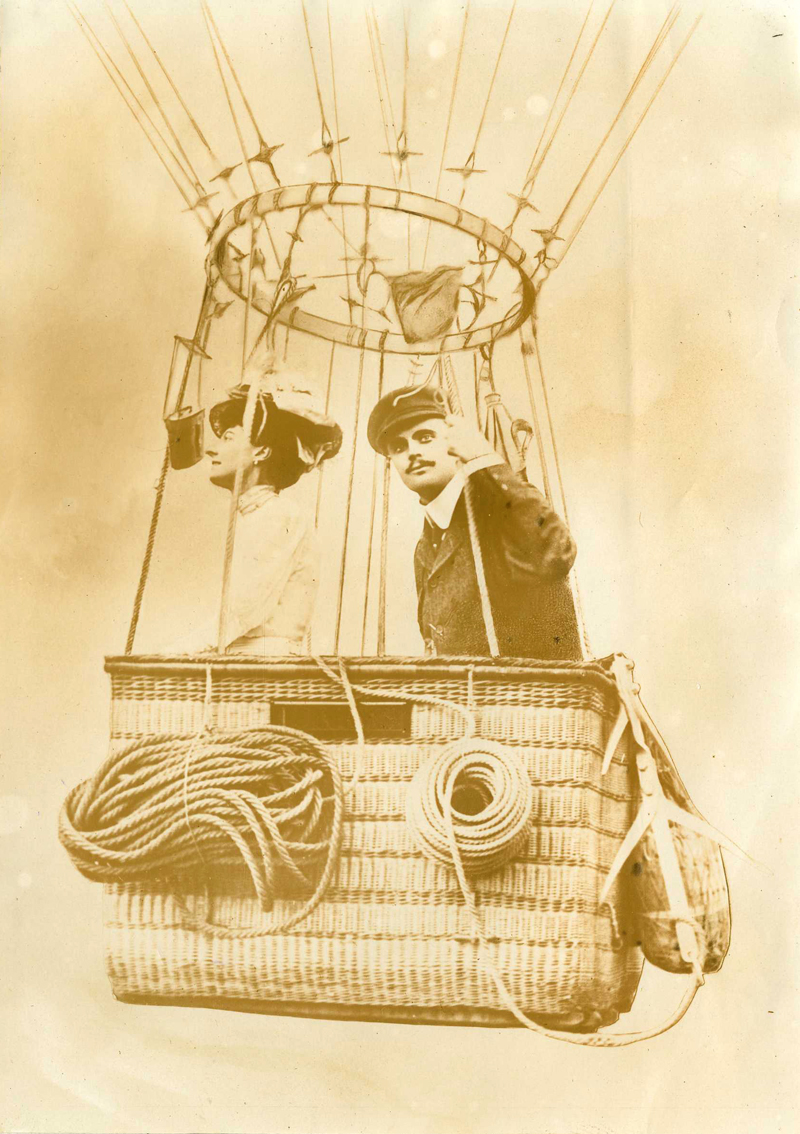
C. S. Rolls in a balloon, probably his 'Midget'

== Pioneer aviator ==
In 1901, with Santos Dumont

Rolls was a pioneer aviator and initially, balloonist, making over 170 balloon ascents. In 1903 he won the Gordon Bennett Gold Medal for the longest single flight time.

By 1907 Rolls' interest turned increasingly to flying and he tried to persuade Royce to design an aero engine. He became the second Briton to go up in an aeroplane. Piloted by Wilbur Wright, their flight on 8 October 1908 from Camp d'Auvours, eleven kilometres east of Le Mans, lasted four minutes and twenty seconds. He bought one of six Wright Flyer aircraft built by Short Brothers under licence from the Wright Brothers and from early October 1909 made more than 200 flights. He co-founded a ballooning club in 1901 with Frank Hedges Butler that later became the Royal Aero Club. In March 1910, he became the second person the club licensed to fly an aeroplane.

Rolls became the first man to make a non-stop double crossing of the English Channel by plane, taking 95 minutes on 2 June 1910. For this feat, which included the first eastbound aerial crossing of the English Channel, he was awarded the Gold Medal of the Royal Aero Club. (Note: Louis Bleriot on 25 July 1909 and Count Jacques de Lesseps on 21 May 1910 crossed West-bound before him) There is a statue in Monmouth to commemorate the flight and another, by Kathleen Scott, in Dover.

== Death ==
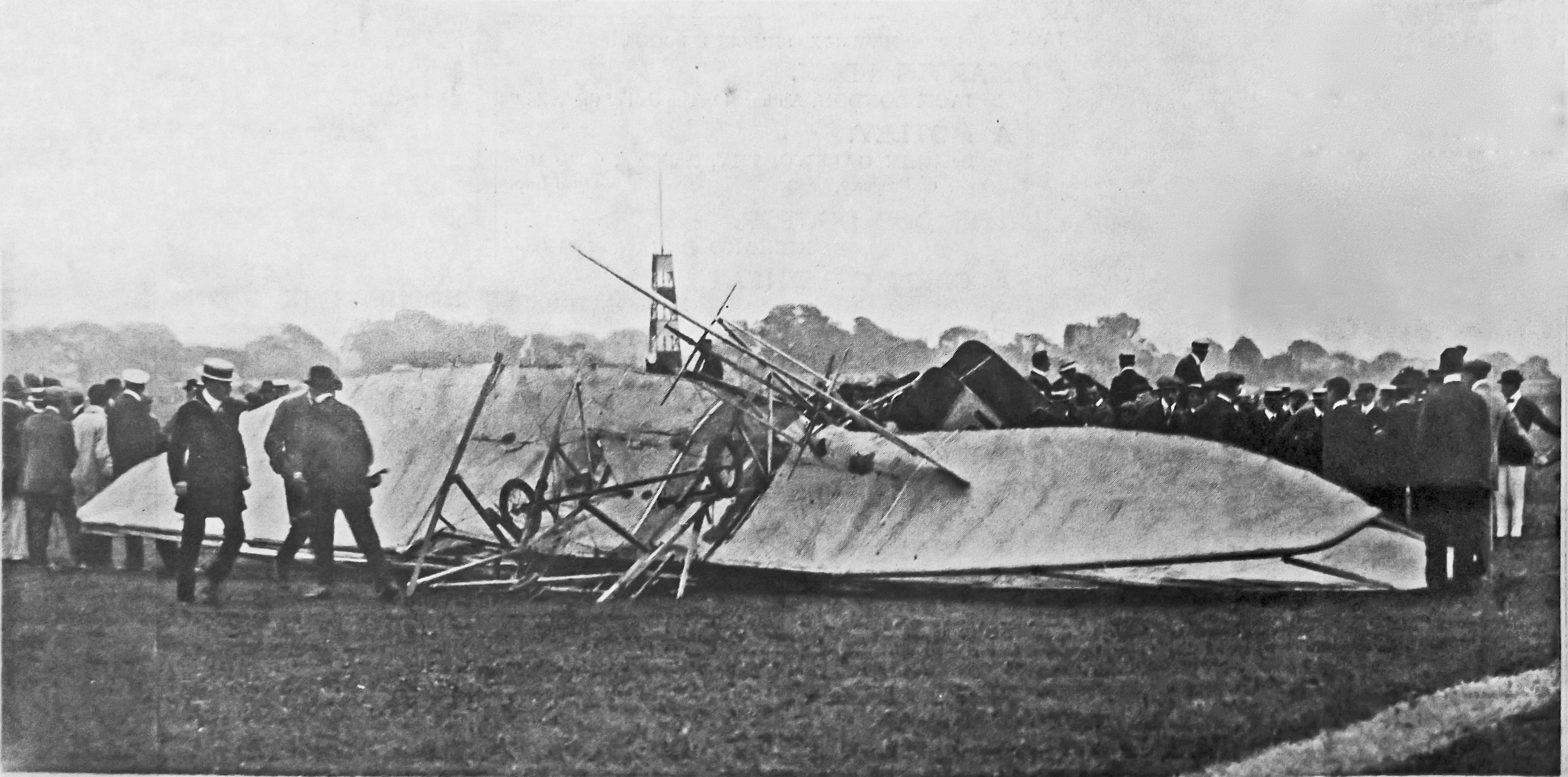
Photograph on the front page of the Illustrated London News, 16 July 1910, showing the wreckage of the plane crash which killed Rolls

On 12 July 1910, at the age of 32, Rolls was killed in an air crash at Hengistbury Airfield, Southbourne, Bournemouth when the tail of his Wright Flyer broke off during a flying display. He was the first Briton to be killed in an aeronautical accident with a powered aircraft, and the eleventh person internationally. His was also the first powered aviation fatality in the United Kingdom. (Note: "Mr. Rolls is the tenth airman who has met with a fatal accident in a motor-driven flying machine, and he is the first Englishman who has sacrificed his life in the cause of modern aviation." (Aeroplane Accident, Mr Rolls Killed at Bournemouth. The Times, Wednesday, 13 July 1910; p. 12; Issue 39323))

His grave lies at the churchyard of St Cadoc's Church, Llangattock-Vibon-Avel, where many of the Rolls family lie buried in various family tombs. His grave is just below Llangattock Manor and bears the inscription:

"Blessed are the pure in heart for they shall see God."

A statue in his memory, in which he is seen holding a biplane model, was erected in Agincourt Square, Monmouth. A further memorial to him was unveiled in 1981 in the bottom playing field of St Peter's Catholic School, Bournemouth, which was developed on the site of Hengistbury Airfield. There is a stained-glass window in All Saints' Church, Eastchurch on the Isle of Sheppey, dedicated jointly to Rolls and to fellow pioneer aviator Cecil Grace.

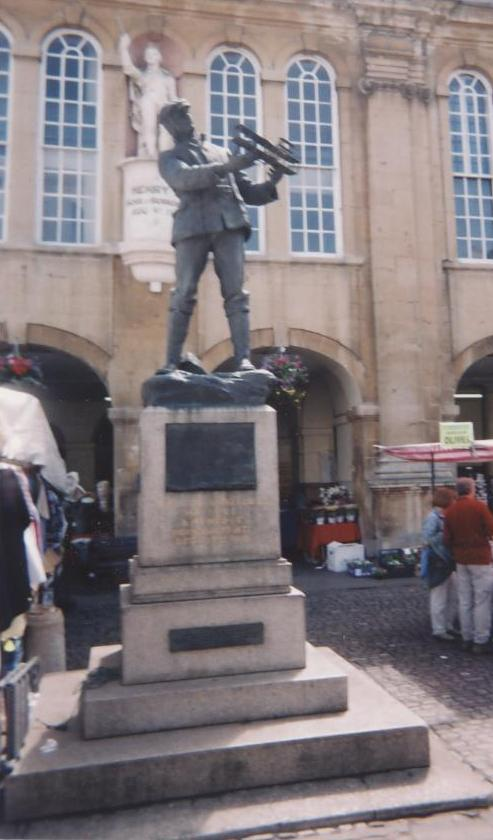
Statue of Charles Rolls, Monmouth

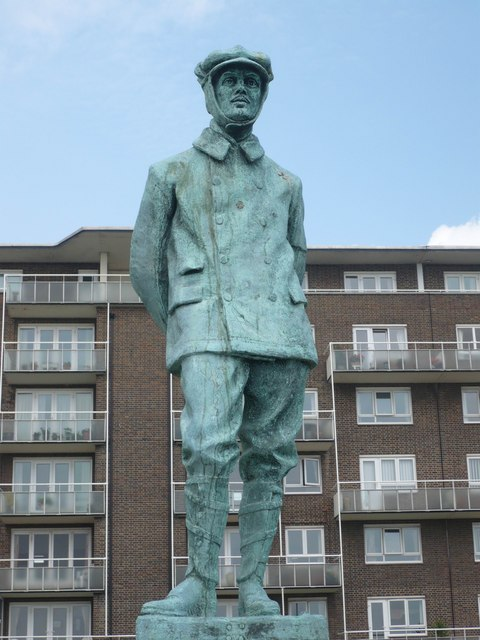
Statue of Charles Rolls in Dover

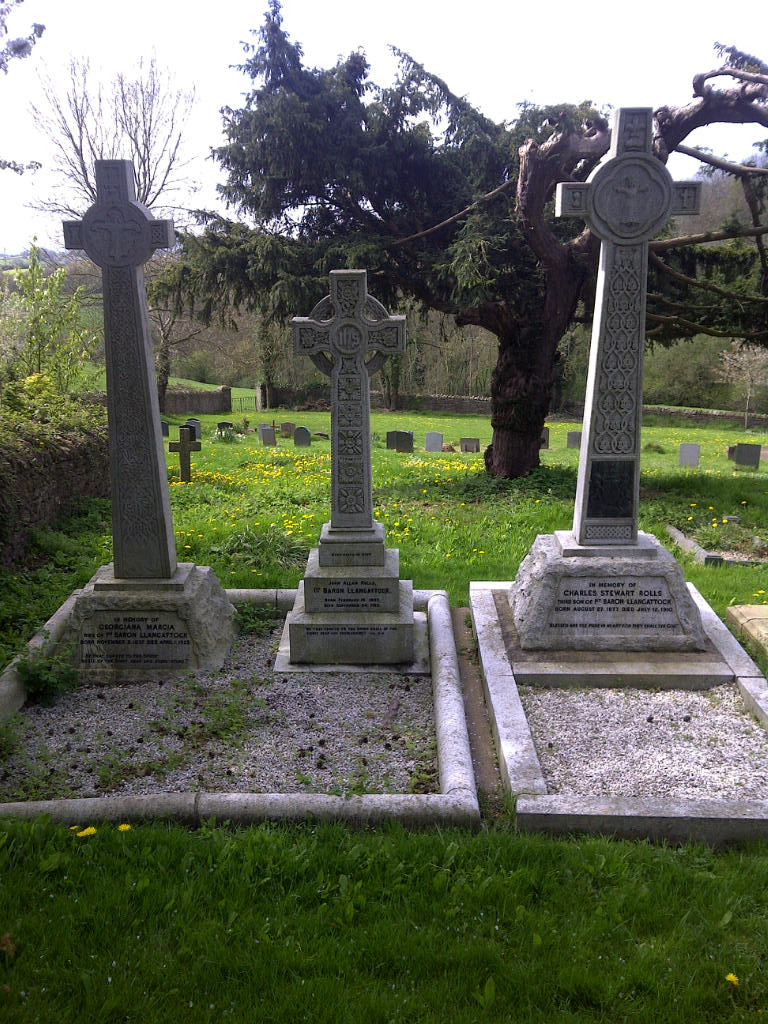
Rolls family graves, Llangattock-Vibon-Avel, Monmouthshire

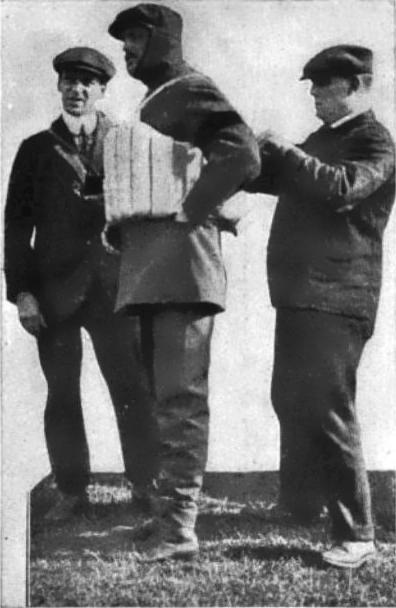
Charles Rolls (centre), 1910

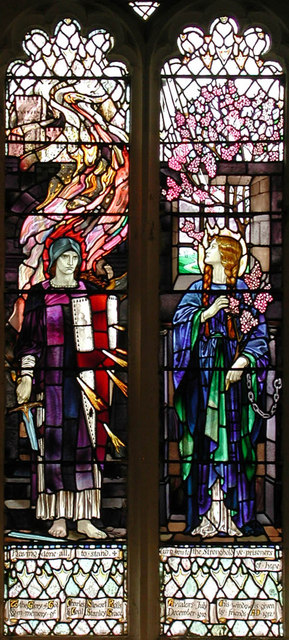
Memorial window by Karl Parsons at Eastchurch, Kent

A memorial to Charles Rolls was dedicated 12 July 2022, at Hengistbury Head, Southbourne, Dorset, between the car park and the Hiker cafe.

This was the same day, date and time as it was in 1910 at the time of his crash at Southbourne, Hampshire [as it was at the time] when the tail came off of his Wright Flyer during a flying display on the airfield at what is now St Peters School.

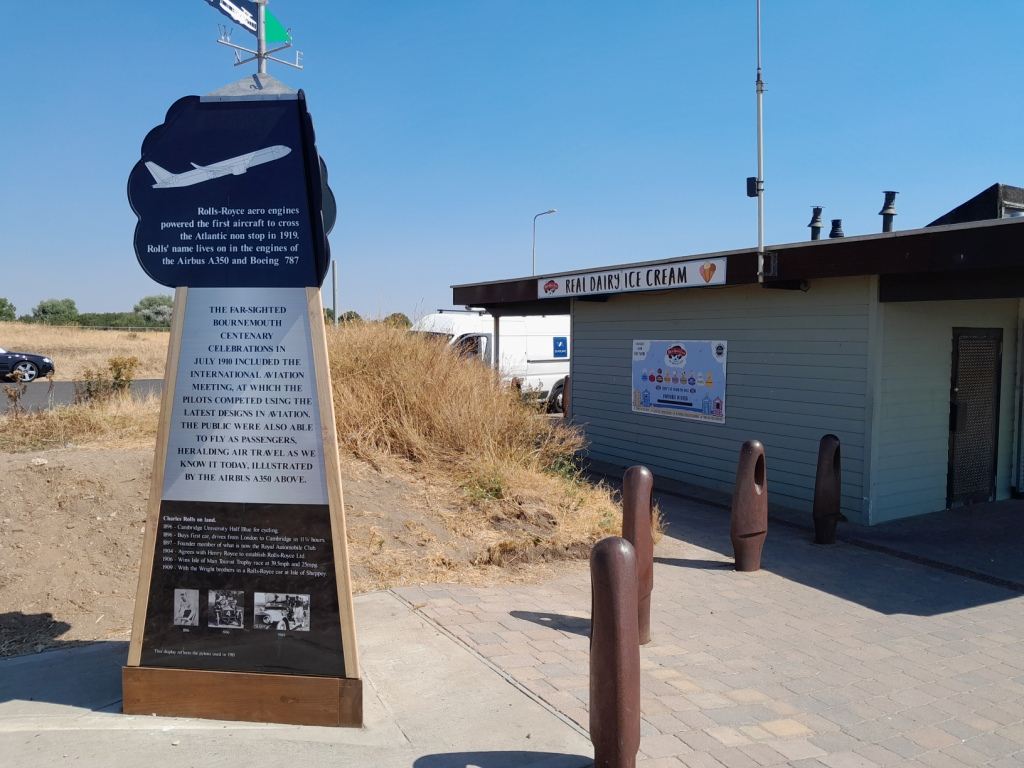
Memorial to Charles Rolls at Hengistbury Head, Southbourne, Dorset

Family tree

John Rolls (1735–1801)	Sarah Coysh (c. 1742–1801)
John Rolls of The Hendre (1776–1837)	Martha
John Etherington Welch Rolls (1807–70)	Elizabeth Mary Long
John Allan Rolls (1837–1912)	Georgiana Marcia Maclean (1837–1923)
John Maclean Rolls (1870–1916)	Henry Alan Rolls (1871–1916)	Eleanor Shelley-Rolls (1872–1961)	Charles Stewart Rolls (1877–1910) (co-founder of Rolls-Royce)

== Cultural depictions ==
- Actor Robert Powell portrays Rolls in the 1972–1973 miniseries The Edwardians.
