= Frank Hedges Butler =

British wine merchant

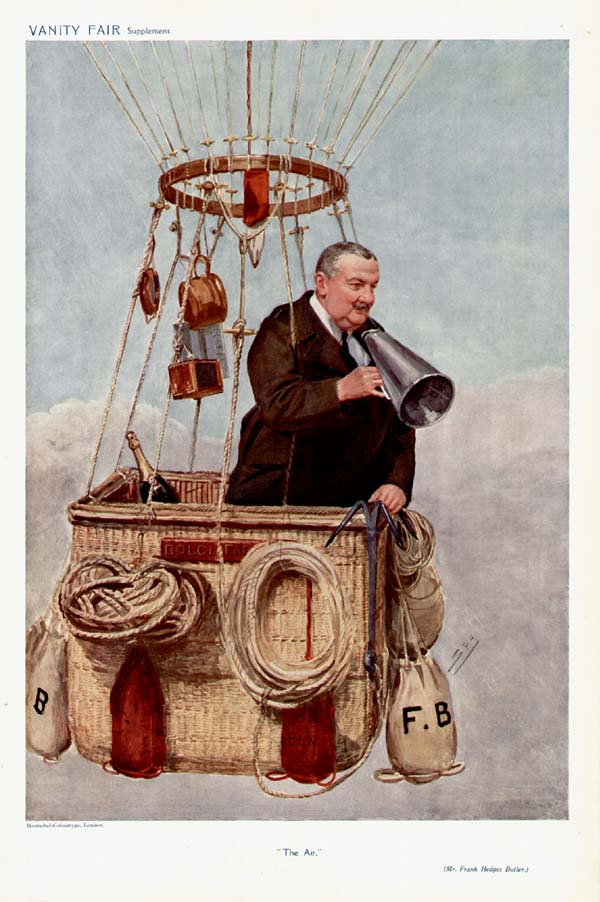
Caricature of Butler by Leslie Ward from Vanity Fair, 1907

Frank Hedges Butler (17 December 1855 – 27 November 1928) was a British wine merchant, and a founding member of the Aero Club of Great Britain.

== Early life ==
Frank Hedges Butler was born in London on 17 December 1855, the fifth son of the wine merchant James Butler and his wife, Frances Mary, the eldest daughter of Butler's business partner, William Hedges. He was educated at a preparatory school in Brighton, and at a boarding school in Upper Clapton. Butler then studied in France and Germany in order to learn the languages.

== Career ==
Butler became a partner in the family business, Hedges and Butler, in 1882. He was one of the first people in Britain to own a motor car, buying a Benz in 1897, and was the first honorary treasurer of the Automobile Club of Great Britain. With Charles Rolls, he helped to organize races from 1898, including the RAC 1000 Mile Challenge, in which he took part, accompanied by his daughter.

He was introduced to ballooning by Charles Rolls. During an ascent from Crystal Palace in London on 24 September 1901 in a balloon named City of York, he was accompanied by Rolls, his daughter Vera Hedges Butler, and Stanley Spencer (aeronaut). While flying over Sidcup, Frank's daughter Vera suggested the formation of an aero club within the Automobile Club. This, the Aero Club of Great Britain, later the Royal Aero Club, would become the regulatory body for aviation in England, responsible for issuing pilot's licenses and also playing an important part in the development of military aviation in Britain. By 1907 he had made more than a hundred balloon ascents, including the longest solo flight made in England in 1902, and what was then the longest cross-channel balloon voyage, from Wandsworth in London to Caen in 1905. This flight had not originated as an attempt to fly the Channel: the intention had been to observe an eclipse of the sun. In 1907 he published an account of his ballooning career, entitled 5000 miles in a Balloon.

Butler was the second English passenger taken aloft by Wilbur Wright during his demonstration flights in France in 1908. He later became the first person to take a flying lesson at the flying school established at Hendon by Louis Blériot, although he never gained a pilot's licence.

He was an enthusiastic traveller, not only frequently visiting France, Spain and Portugal in connection with his business, but also travelling to the Far East, North and South America, Lapland and Russia. An account of his trip to Lapland, Through Lapland with Reindeer and Skis, was published in 1917, and other travel books include Fifty Years of Travel by Land, Water and Air (1920), Round the World (1925) and Wine and the Wine Lands of the World (1927). He was elected a Fellow of the Royal Geographical Society in 1877.

== Personal life ==
He married Ada Tickle, the daughter of a wool merchant, in 1880: the couple had two daughters, Frances, who died in infancy and Vera. Ada died in 1905.

Hedges Butler was an able amateur violinist and played as one of the first violins for the Imperial Institute Orchestral Society, which he founded in 1894. He was also a keen golfer, yachtsman and big-game hunter. He died in a nursing home at 29 Wimpole Street, London, on 27 November 1928 and was buried in Norwood cemetery.
