= Monmouth Festival =

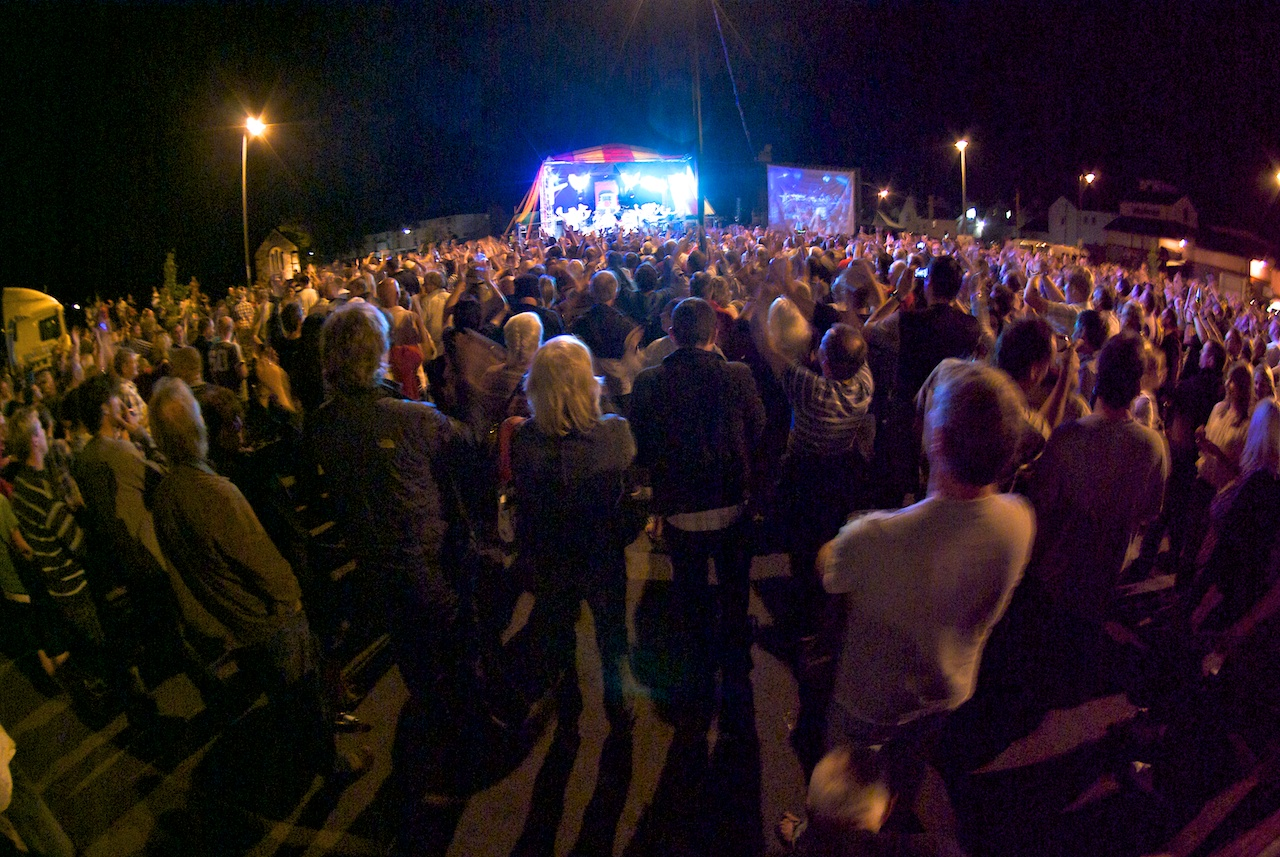
- Pink Floyd tribute band gathers a crowd
- Location: Monmouth
- Years active: 1982–2019; current hiatus
- Website: Monmouth Festival website

Monmouth Festival is an annual nine-day free music festival which takes place in the market town of Monmouth, south east Wales, United Kingdom. It is organised by a non-profit-making small team of volunteers from the local community, and was started in 1982.

It is one of Europe’s few remaining free music festivals, and it attracts visitors from all over the world. Performers include local and national musicians from a range of genres including rock, classical, pop, folk, jazz, ska, punk and world music. Notable recent acts have included Goldie Lookin Chain, Dr and the Medics, Gino Washington, The Animals, Mungo Jerry, The Drifters and Eddie and the Hot Rods.

== Carnival Sunday ==
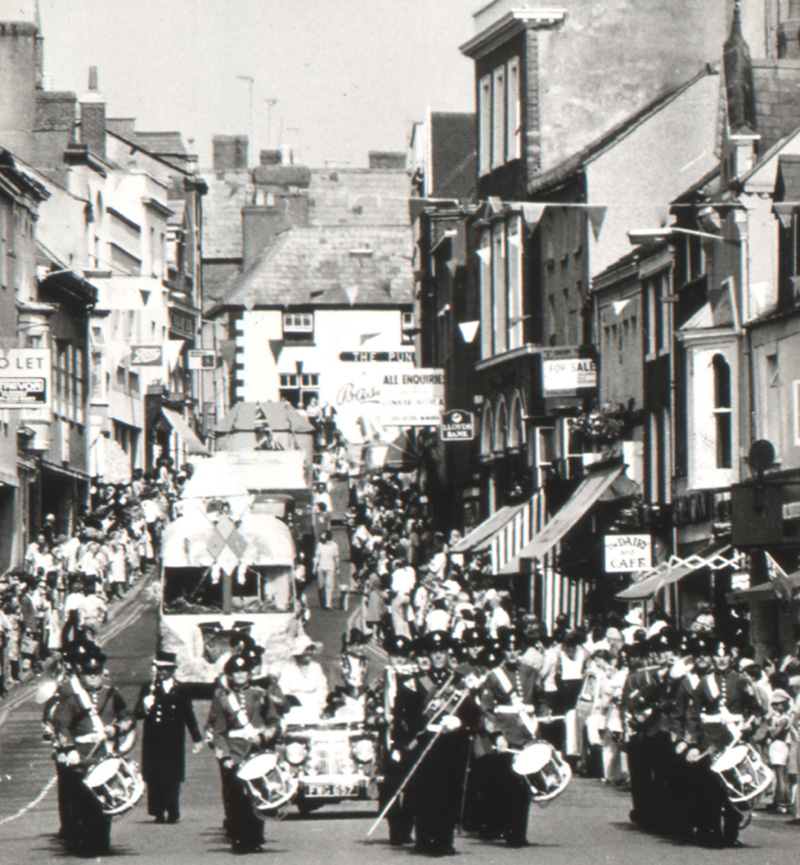
Monnow street in 1976 during the Monmouth Carnival

Monmouth's annual carnival day is also part of the festival. In recent years, the carnival has included stalls, workshops, street entertainers, a funfair, zorbs and chariot races. The highlight is the Carnival Procession, which sees people thronging the streets of Monmouth to watch floats, dancers and walkers organised by local groups and businesses.

== Venues ==
The main performances take place on an outdoor stage which for the last few years has been sited during the festival week in the large car park at the bottom of the town, between the ancient gatehouse and new bridges. Previously it was sited in the centre of the town, in front of the Shire Hall.

Other performances take place at St Mary's Church in the centre of the town, and in local pubs The Three Horseshoes and The Green Dragon.

== Funding ==
There is no regular funding for the festival. It relies on donations from audiences during the week (through 'bucket collections'), sponsorship from local businesses, and occasionally small grants. This money pays for artists, staging, sound and lighting, as well as aspects such as leaflet and T-shirt printing, insurance, security, toilets and traffic management.
