= The Angel Hotel, Monmouth =

Historic building in Wales

The Angel Hotel
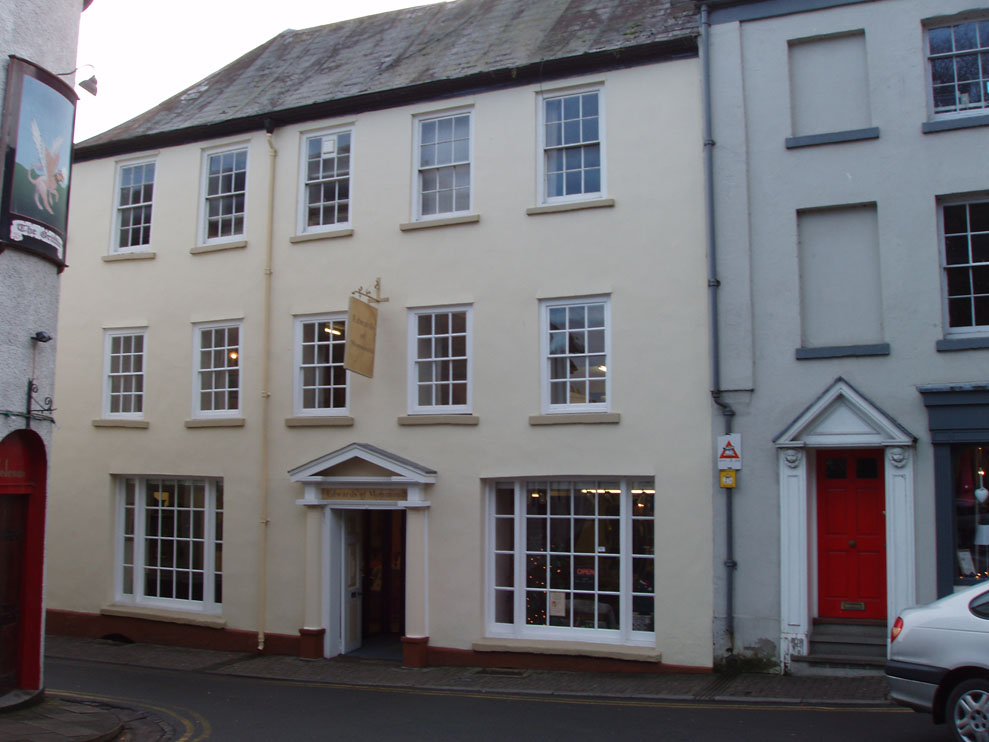
- The former Angel Hotel, now a furniture shop
- Location in Monmouth

General information
- Location: Monmouth, Wales
- Coordinates: 51.8127°N 2.7142°W

The Angel Hotel, Church Street, Monmouth, Monmouthshire, south-east Wales is a Grade II listed building. The building was in use as an inn in 1700 and closed in 1985, the longest period of continuous history of any public house in Monmouth. The building is of three storeys, with a roof of Welsh slate and a wooden Doric doorcase. During the late nineteenth century, the hotel was the headquarters of the Monmouth Branch of the Cyclists Touring Club. It is one of 24 buildings on the Monmouth Heritage Trail and is now the headquarters of international charity Bees for Development.

== History ==
This site began life as Robert le Ffrere's shop around 1240, rented by him for one pound of cumin paid annually. About 40 years later it was acquired by Edmund of Lancaster, (Edmund Crouchback, brother of Edward I), and he granted half a mark yearly, out of the profits, to maintain a lamp burning day and night before the altar of the Holy Cross in the parish church. It was said that the lamp was still burning two hundred years later, but by 1613 the shop had become the brew house for St Mary's Priory Church, Monmouth. By 1700 it was an inn with the appropriate name of The Angel. It remained The Angel Inn until 1965, an extraordinarily long existence for an inn, when it was returned to its former use as a shop.

In 1720, when the landlord was John Roome, one of his customers stole two pewter plates and a flaxen napkin. She was caught and whipped at the cart's tail around the town. In 1804, Charles Heath was plainly impressed by the inn, since he wrote: "The Angel Inn kept by Mrs Pugh, has long been a house of great respectability, and frequented by the mercantile travellers of the kingdom, whose business connects them with the trading part of the borough, - and is but justice to add, that her kind attention to her guests, has long secured her the highest place in their good opinion".

The inn was nearly destroyed in 1857 when a disgruntled jockey, who had been beaten at Monmouth Races, tried to set fire to the winning horse which had been stabled there. He was caught in the act and convicted.

The Angel had several Friendly Societies, and a Society of Tradesmen and Others met there in 1794. Later, the Black Swan Friendly Society transferred to it, and in 1850 the Sons of Equity met there. In 1884, the landlady, Mrs Creeper, advertised the fact that "The omnibus passes the door to meet every train". These were the coaches from the King's Head Hotel and Beaufort Arms Hotel which called at the Angel Hotel to pick up passengers. At one time, cycle touring was a popular pastime along the Wye Valley, and the Angel became the headquarters of the Monmouth Branch of the Cyclists Touring Club. Together with the Beaufort and King's Head, the Angel became a Trust House Hotel in the mid- 20th century and closed around 1965. It remained The Angel Inn until 1985, when it closed and was extensively altered in its conversion to a furniture showroom.

It is one of 24 buildings on the Monmouth Heritage Trail and is now the headquarters of international charity Bees for Development.
