= Judges' Lodgings, Monmouth =

The Judges' Lodgings
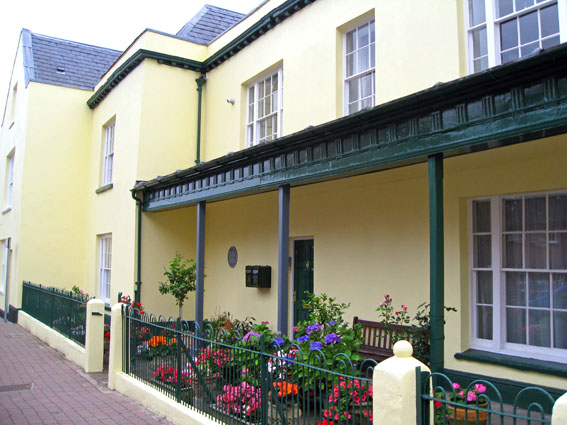
- St James' Mews - used as the Judges' Lodgings in the 19th century
- Interactive map of the The Judges' Lodgings area
- Former names: Labour in Vain; Somerset House

General information
- Location: Whitecross Street, Monmouth, Wales
- Coordinates: 51.81306°N 2.71193°W
- Completed: <1756

Design and construction
- Designations: Grade II listed

The Judges' Lodgings, located in Whitecross Street, Monmouth, south east Wales, is an eighteenth-century building, with earlier origins, on the edge of St James' Square. It has its origins as an early 16th-century town house, becoming the 'Labour in Vain' inn around 1756. It was in use as the Judges' Lodgings for the Monmouth Assizes before 1835, and as the Militia Officers' Mess in the 1870s. Today it is a private house, with modern mews cottages built into the rear. It is a Grade II listed building and is one of 24 blue plaque buildings on the Monmouth Heritage Trail.

== History ==
Although there were earlier houses on this site, the earliest recorded building is the Labour in Vain inn in 1756, when it also had a malthouse and stables. It was known as Somerset House in the late eighteenth century, but was still the Labour in Vain in 1822, when it was used by officers of the Monmouth and Brecon Militia as a Mess, as an alternative to the Beaufort Arms, then the town's premier inn.

The building lodged the judges for the Monmouth Assizes held in the Shire Hall, including the trial of the Chartists, where John Frost and two other leaders of the Newport Rising were condemned to death in 1840. "Respectable" society and those in authority were much in fear of Chartism, or indeed of giving any political power to the lower classes, and to guard against sedition Militia were stationed in Monmouth at the White Swan Inn.

In 1926 the Lodgings became a motor garage, with cars served across the footpath from fuel pumps. At one time it was a Conservative Club, before being converted back to private houses, with smaller mews houses behind, in the 1970s.
