= Judges' Lodgings =

Judges Lodgings may refer to:

- Judges' Lodgings, Lancaster, a Grade I listed building
- Judges' Lodgings, Monmouth, a Grade II listed building
- Judges' Lodgings, York, also a Grade I listed building
- Judges' Lodgings, Northampton, a Grade II* listed building
- Judge's Lodging, Presteigne, a Museum in Powys, Wales
- The Judges Lodgings, Gloucester, a Grade II listed building
