= Monmouth Heritage Trail =

Town walk through Monmouth, Wales

The Monmouth Heritage Trail is a walking route which connects various sights in the town of Monmouth, Wales.

== History ==
In 2009 Monmouth Civic Society identified 24 historic and interesting buildings in the town, and organised the production and fixing of ceramic blue plaques to them. The plaques were made by Ned Heywood of Chepstow, with a stoneware body and raised text in both English and Welsh, set off by a blue glaze. The space for text was limited, and each plaque contained a brief summary of the importance of the building to the town. Some choices were obvious, such as the Monnow Bridge and Shire Hall, both symbols of the town and listed buildings. Others were less well known, such as The Nelson Garden or Monmouth Methodist Church, even though townspeople passed them every day. The map and list of Blue Plaque buildings is shown below.

The guide information is available in Welsh, but a larger number of languages are available in Wikipedia. The "MonmouthpediA" project provides visitors with information about all aspects of the town via QRpedia QR codes.

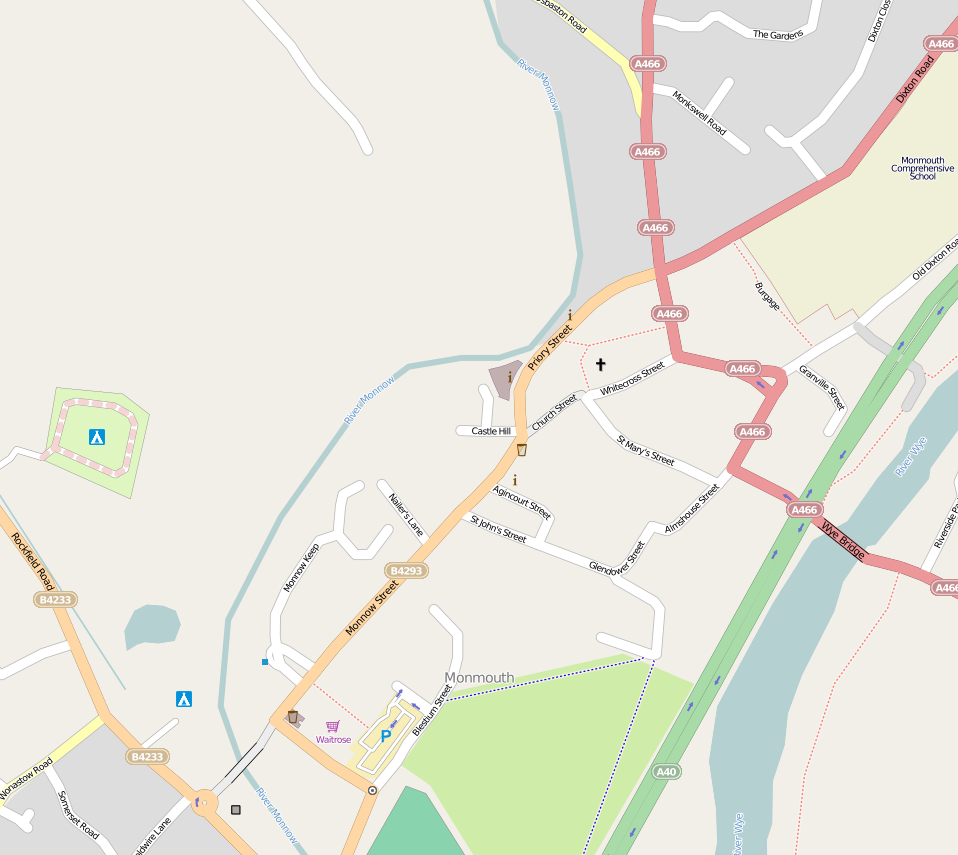
The Heritage Trail

== Key ==
Grade	Criteria
Grade I	Buildings of exceptional interest, sometimes considered to be internationally important.
Grade II*	Particularly important buildings of more than special interest.
Grade II	Buildings of national importance and special interest.

== The buildings ==
No.	Name	Photograph	Grade	Date	Location^{[A]}	Description
1	Drybridge House	Drybridge House	II*	1671	51.809°N 2.7233°W	Drybridge House is a large 17th-century Grade II* listed building in Monmouth, south-east Wales. It is located to the southwest of the town, close to the “dry bridge” over a small stream, which is now buried beneath a nearby roundabout. It is now managed as the Bridges Community Centre.
2	St Thomas the Martyr Church	St Thomas The Martyr's Church	II*	c.1170	51.8084°N 2.720408°W	The Church of St Thomas the Martyr is located beside the medieval Monnow Bridge across the River Monnow. At least part of the building dates from around 1180, and it has a fine 12th-century Norman chancel arch, though the exterior was largely rebuilt in the early 19th century.
3	Monnow Bridge	Monnow Bridge	I	13 C	51.809°N 2.7200°W	Monnow Bridge is the only remaining mediæval fortified river bridge in Great Britain with its gate tower still standing in place. It crosses the River Monnow some 500m above where it joins the River Wye. It is a scheduled ancient monument.
4	Robin Hood Inn	Robin Hood Inn	II*	late medieval	51.8095°N 2.7193°W	The Robin Hood Inn, Nos. 124 and 126, Monnow Street is a public house of "late medieval" origins. It is constructed in stone, with a wide, fifteenth-century four-centre doorway and is a rare medieval survival in Monmouth.
5	Roman Fort (Plaque at 12 Monnow Street)	Blestium	na	c. 55AD	51.80447°N 2.7233°W	Blestium (also Blestio in the Antonine Itinerary (Iter XIII)) was a small fort and iron working centre in the Roman province of Britannia Superior, part of Roman Britain. It has been identified with the site of the later town of Monmouth in south east Wales, located adjoining the confluence of the River Monnow with the River Wye.
6	King's Head Hotel	King's Head Hotel	II*	17 C	51.811935°N 2.715721°W	The King's Head Hotel is opposite the Shire Hall in Agincourt Square. It dates from the mid-17th century, and as one of the major inns in Monmouth was reputedly visited by Charles I of England in 1645. It has a fine black-and-white painted stone façade and became an important posting inn in the late 17th century.
7	Shire Hall	Shire Hall	I	1724	51.811973°N 2.715404°W	The Shire Hall is a prominent Grade I listed building in the town centre. It was built in 1724, and was formerly the centre for the Assize Courts and Quarter Sessions for Monmouthshire. In 1840, the court was the location of the trial of the Chartist leader John Frost and others for high treason for their part in the Newport Rising. The building was also used as a market place.
8	Great Castle House	Great Castle Househ	I	1673	51.8127°N 2.7164°W	Great Castle House is a former town house built on the site of part of Monmouth Castle. It is arguably the town's most significant building in architectural terms. The house is located on Castle Hill, off Agincourt Square in Monmouth town centre.
9	Market Hall	Market Hall	II	1830s	51.813°N 2.7154°W	The Market Hall, Priory Street, is an early Victorian building by the prolific Monmouth architect George Vaughan Maddox. It was constructed in the years 1837–1839 as the centrepiece of a redevelopment of part of Monmouth town centre. After being severely damaged by fire in 1963, it was partly rebuilt and is now the home of Monmouth Museum (formerly the Nelson Museum). At the rear of the building are original slaughterhouses opening onto the River Monnow.
10	Monmouth Priory	Monmouth Priory	II*	1075	51.8135°N 2.71413°W	Monmouth Priory is a building that incorporates the remains of the monastic buildings attached to St Mary’s Priory Church. The priory was a Benedictine foundation of 1075, and parts of the medieval buildings remain. The buildings were substantially redeveloped in the nineteenth century for use as St Mary's National School, and now form a community centre.
11	St Mary’s Priory Church	St Mary's Church	II*	18 - 19 C	51.8132°N 2.714°W	St Mary's Priory Church, in Whitecross Street, is an Anglican church founded as a Benedictine priory in 1075. The current church dates mostly from the 18th and 19th centuries. It was designated a Grade II* listed building in 1952.
12	Monmouth County Gaol	County Gaol	II	1780s	51.817°N 2.713°W	The County Gaol was Monmouthshire's main prison when it was opened in 1790. A castellated medieval fortress, it served as the county jail of Monmouthshire and criminals or those who fell foul of the authorities were hanged here until the 1850s and some 3,000 people viewed the last hanging. The jail covered an area of about an acre, with a chapel, infirmary, living quarters and a treadmill. It was closed in 1869.
13	Rolls Hall	Rolls Hall	II	1887	51.813°N 2.711°W	The Rolls Hall, Whitecross Street, is a Victorian hall, now public library, donated to the town in celebration of Queen Victoria's Golden Jubilee by John Rolls, the future Lord Llangattock. It is a Grade II listed building as of 8 October 2005.
14	Judges' Lodgings	Judges' Lodgings	II	18c	51.81306°N 2.712°W	The Judges' Lodgings, located in Whitecross Street, is an eighteenth-century building, with earlier origins, on the edge of St James' Square. It has its origins as an early 16th-century town house, becoming the 'Labour in Vain' inn around 1756. It was in use as the Judges' Lodgings for the Monmouth Assizes before 1835, and as the Militia Officers' Mess in the 1870s.
15	The Dispensary	Dispensary	na	1860s?	51.8130°N 2.7106°W	The Dispensary, Monmouth is a Georgian town house which is fairly typical of many town-centre houses in Monmouth, dating from the mid-18th century, but with early 19th-century additions. It stands in St James' Square, opposite the Catalpa Tree.
16	Monmouth Methodist Church	Methodist Church	II*	1837	51.812°N 2.710°W	Monmouth Methodist Church is set well back from St James' Street between buildings. Designed by George Vaughan Maddox and built in 1837, it retains its original galleries, organ loft and sophisticated pulpit.
17	St Mary's Roman Catholic Church	St Mary's Roman Catholic Church	II	1793	51.812306°N 2.713°W	St Mary's Roman Catholic Church, in St Mary's Street near the centre of Monmouth, is the earliest post-Reformation Catholic public place of worship to be permitted in Wales. The church is a late Georgian Roman Catholic church with later Victorian additions by the Catholic convert architect Benjamin Bucknall. It is a Grade II listed building as of 15 August 1974.
18	Angel Hotel	Angel Hotel	II	17 C	51.8127°N 2.7142°W	The Angel Hotel, Church Street, is a Grade II listed building. The building was in use as an inn in 1700 and closed in 1985, the longest period of continuous history of any public house in Monmouth. The building is of two storeys, with a roof of Welsh slate and a wooden Doric doorcase. During the late nineteenth century, the hotel was the headquarters of the Monmouth Branch of the Cyclists Touring Club
19	Savoy Theatre	Savoy Theatre	II*	19C	51.81284°N 2.7145°W	The Savoy Theatre is a theatre and cinema in a town of some 9,000 residents in south east Wales. It is a Grade II* listed building, which was refurbished in 1928 in traditional style, and is reputedly the oldest working theatre site in Wales. It has a capacity of 360 seats and is now run by a charitable trust.
20	The White Swan Inn	White Swan Inn	II*	rebuilt 1839	51.809°N 2.723°W	The White Swan Inn, White Swan Court, Church Street, is an eighteenth-century former coaching inn. The building is of three storeys, with a prominent bay window on the ground floor, and faced with white stucco which dates from the early nineteenth century. There was an earlier inn, the Swan and Falcon, on this site from at least 1709.
21	Agincourt House	Agincourt House	II*	17-19C	51.812472°N 2.715°W	Agincourt House, No. 1 Agincourt Square is a notable early seventeenth-century half-timbered building. The building has been much restored, but the bargeboard over the gable onto Agincourt Square gives a date of 1624. The initials either side of the date are those of William Roberts.
22	Beaufort Arms Hotel	Beaufort Arms Hotel	II*	1830s	51.812°N 2.715°W	The Beaufort Arms Hotel, Agincourt Square, is a former coaching inn dating from the early eighteenth century, though the frontage may have been modified by the prolific early Victorian architect George Vaughan Maddox in the 1830s. A stone cornice on the central block still carries the inscription "The Beaufort Arms". It is a Grade II* listed building as of 27 June 1952
23	Hyam's Mineral Water Works	Hyam's Mineral Water Works	na	1866	51.811°N 2.714°W	Hyam's Mineral Water Works is a nineteenth-century building at 23 Glendower Street. Formerly a mineral water works, it is currently used as residential apartments. This mineral water works for the manufacture of soda water, lemonade and ginger beer, was established in Glendower Street in 1866 by Thomas E. Hyam, a leading figure in nineteenth-century Monmouth.
24	The Nelson Garden	Nelson Garden	II*	nom.1802	51.811°N 2.7156°W	The Nelson Garden, on 13 Chippenhamgate Street, at the rear of No.18 Monnow Street is a nineteenth-century garden that was the scene of a tea party held to honour Lord Nelson in 1802. It is bounded on the south by the line of the medieval town wall through which it is entered via a short underground passageway.
