= Nelson Garden =

Garden in Monmouth, Wales

The Nelson Garden
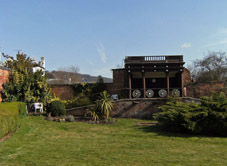
- Nelson's Seat
- Interactive map of The Nelson Garden
- Type: Garden
- Location: Chippenhamgate Street
- Nearest city: Monmouth
- Coordinates: 51°48′40″N 2°42′56″W
- Created: 19th century
- Status: Grade II* listed (structures) / Cadw/ICOMOS Register of Parks and Gardens of Special Historic Interest in Wales

The Nelson Garden, on 13 Chippenhamgate Street, Monmouth, Monmouthshire is a 19th-century garden that was the scene of a tea party held to honour Lord Nelson in 1802. It is included on the Cadw/ICOMOS Register of Parks and Gardens of Special Historic Interest in Wales.

A narrow, east–west section of the garden, to the west of the main area, links it to no.18 Monnow Street, the house with which the garden is associated. However, public access is now via a short underground passageway. The garden is managed by a trust.

== History ==
The walled garden was the site of a real tennis court in the 17th century and was a bowling green by 1718. It then became an orchard; an example of an 18th-century hypocaust (heated) wall still survives, where fruit trees would have been 'espaliered' (trained flat) against the warm brickwork. There are traces of the stoking chamber for this wall in a neighbouring garden. Roman and Norman remains lie deep beneath the lawn.

The Nelson Garden commemorates Lord Nelson's visit to Monmouth on August 19, 1802, with Sir William and Lady Emma Hamilton on the occasion of their tour of the Wye Valley. Having been entertained at the Beaufort Arms, the party adjourned "accompanied by Colonel Lindsay to the beautiful summerhouse in his garden there to enjoy the refreshment of tea or coffee and to pass the rest of the evening in that charming retreat". Although the 'charming retreat' has vanished, in about 1840 the present Memorial Pavilion was erected, possibly to the design of George Vaughan Maddox, the Monmouth architect. Being of timber, various parts have had to be replaced over time and it is not known how much of the current structure is original. "Lord Nelson's Seat" remains an attractive feature, bearing a plaque commemorating Nelson's visit. (Note: The RCAHMW records the plaque as bearing the date "August XIX. MDCCCII" (August 14th. 1802).) The Royal Commission on the Ancient and Historical Monuments of Wales describes the summerhouse as "important and unusual."

Until 1950 the garden was maintained by the resident managers of the adjoining bank (Lloyds Bank occupied 18 Monnow Street, a listed building). This changed when their families were allowed to live elsewhere, but the garden continued to be maintained by resident tenants. Thereafter the garden deteriorated, but in 1994 the Nelson Society and Monmouth Archaeological Society, began restoration. In 1996 the Welsh Historic Gardens Trust became involved and in 1997 set up a restoration committee to care for the garden. In 2001 the committee negotiated a 10-year sub-lease from Lloyds Bank, funded conservation work on the entrance tunnel, and installed a decorative iron screen to separate the garden from the rest of the bank property.

== Architecture ==
The garden structures, including the pavilion, are Grade II* listed.

== Access and conservation ==
The garden is listed at Grade II on the Cadw/ICOMOS Register of Parks and Gardens of Special Historic Interest in Wales.

The garden is on the Monmouth Heritage Trail which frames 24 sites of historic interest. The garden is now managed by the Nelson Garden Preservation Trust which aims to establish a comprehensive historic restoration scheme and ensure its long-term future. The garden is usually open to the public between April and September on Fridays between 2–4 p.m.

== Gallery ==
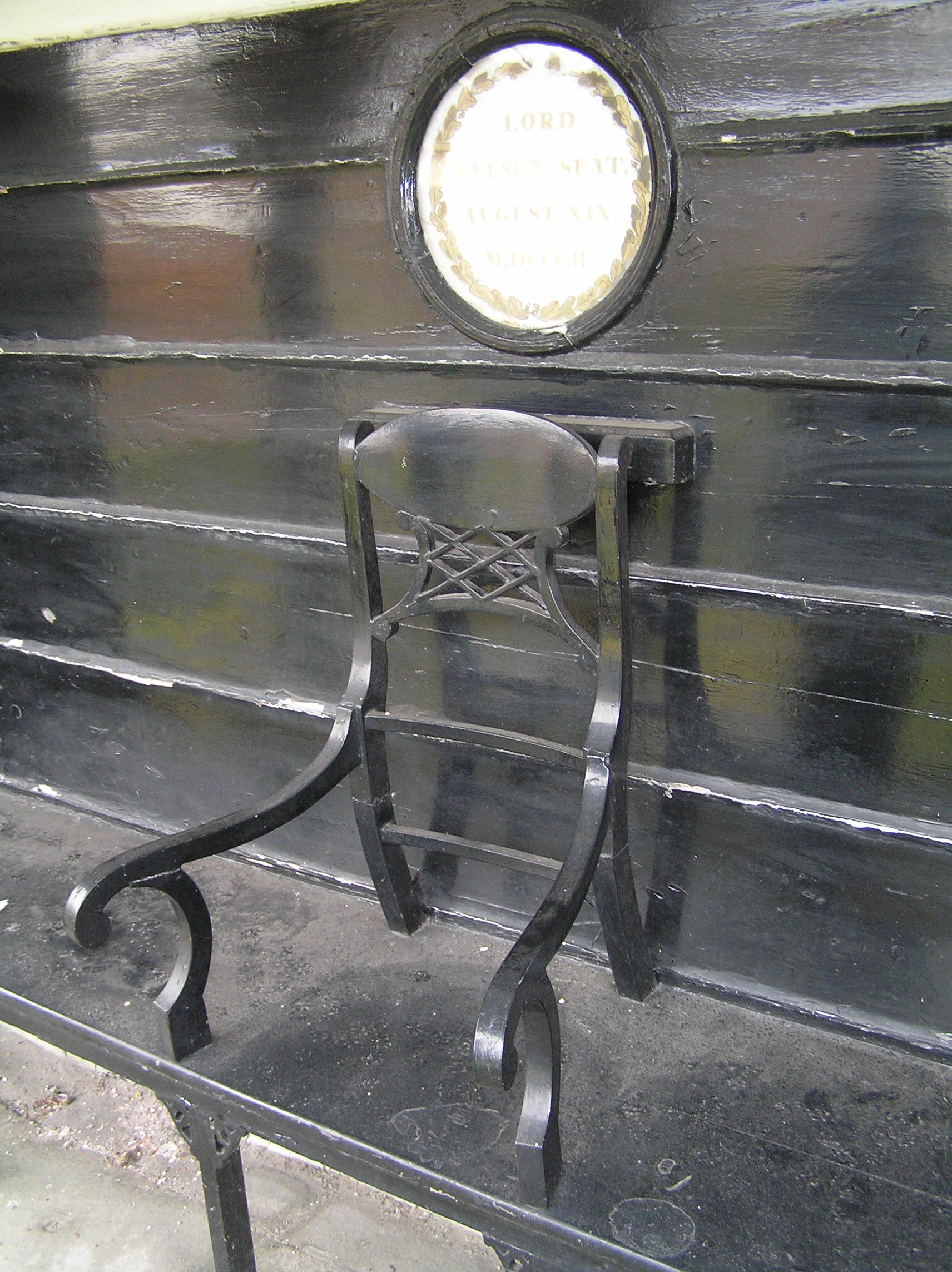
The seat where Nelson sat to take tea in 1802

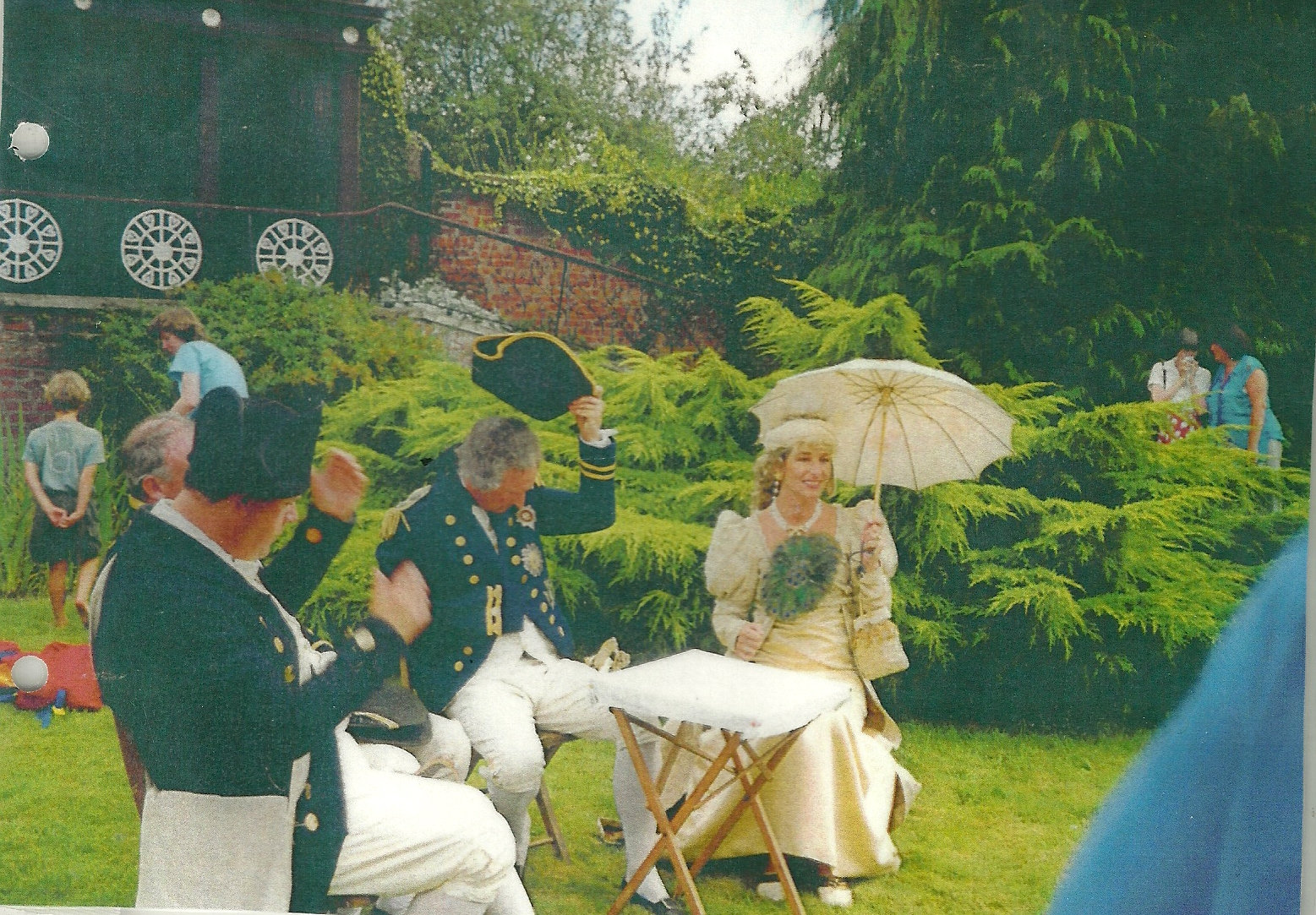
In 2002 it was the bi-centenary of the Nelson's visit to the garden

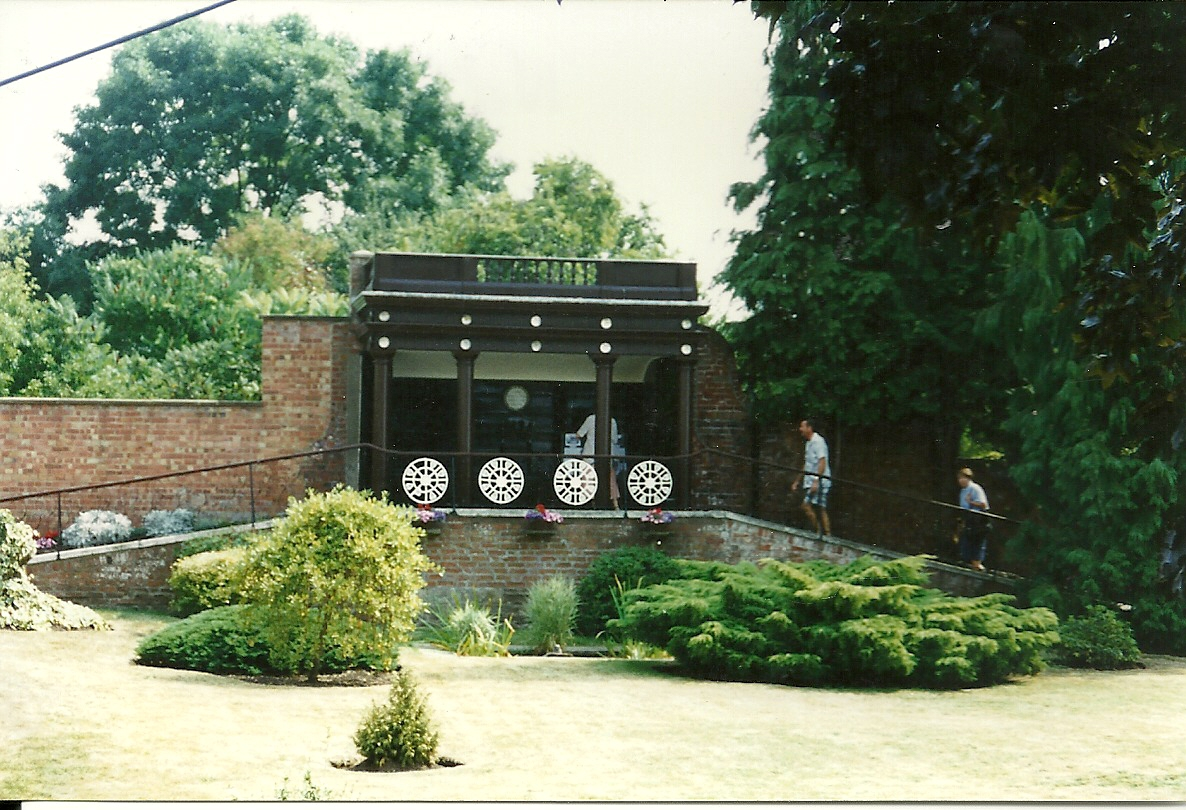
The Nelson pavilion

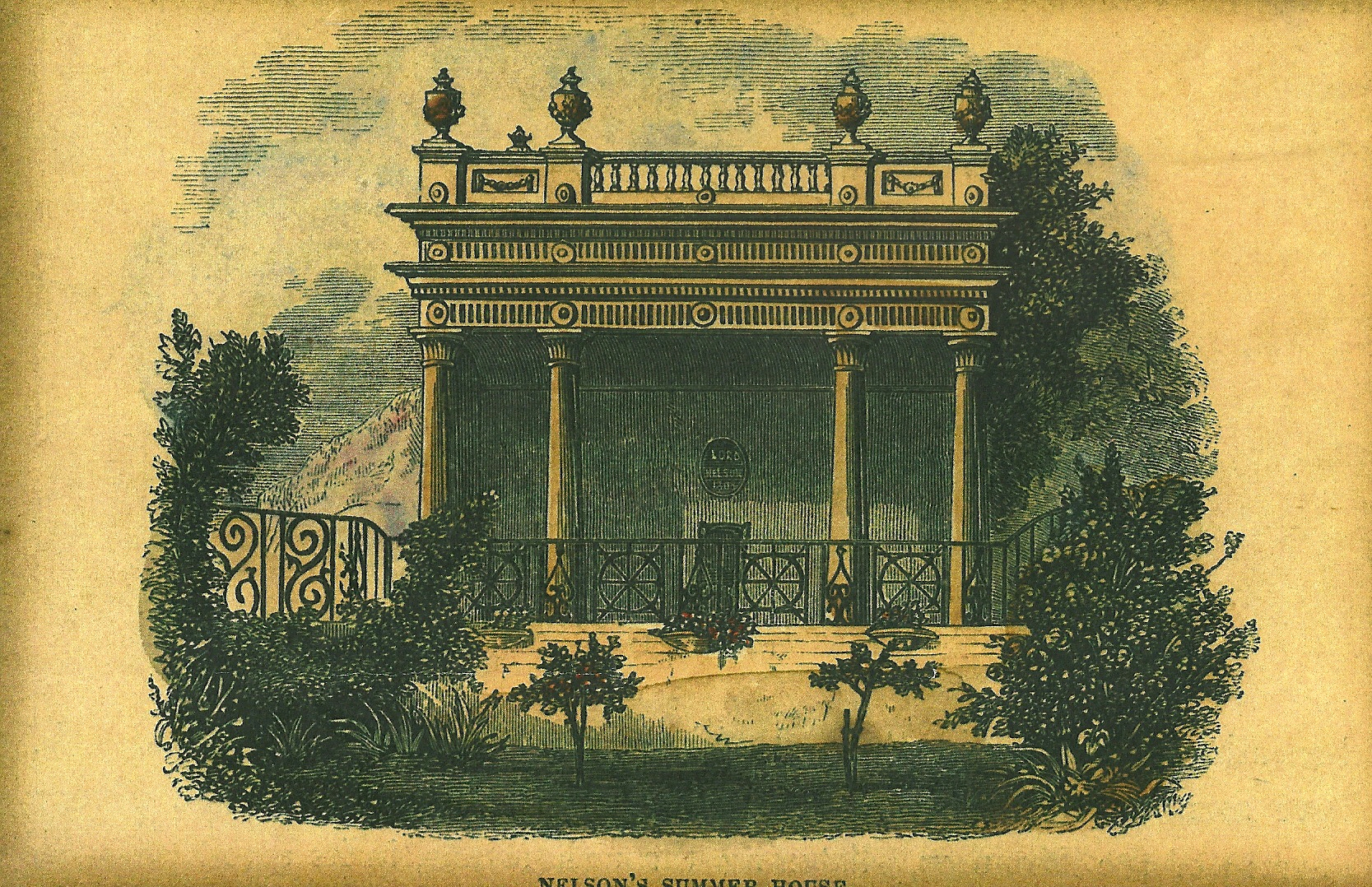
C.19th engraving of the pavilion

== Sources ==
- Bly, Phil (2012). Guide to the complete Monmouth Heritage Blue Plaque Trail. Monmouth: Monmouth Civic Society. OCLC 797974800.
- Newman, John (2000). Gwent/Monmouthshire. The Buildings of Wales. London: Penguin. ISBN 978-0-300-09630-9.
