= 9 Agincourt Street, Monmouth =

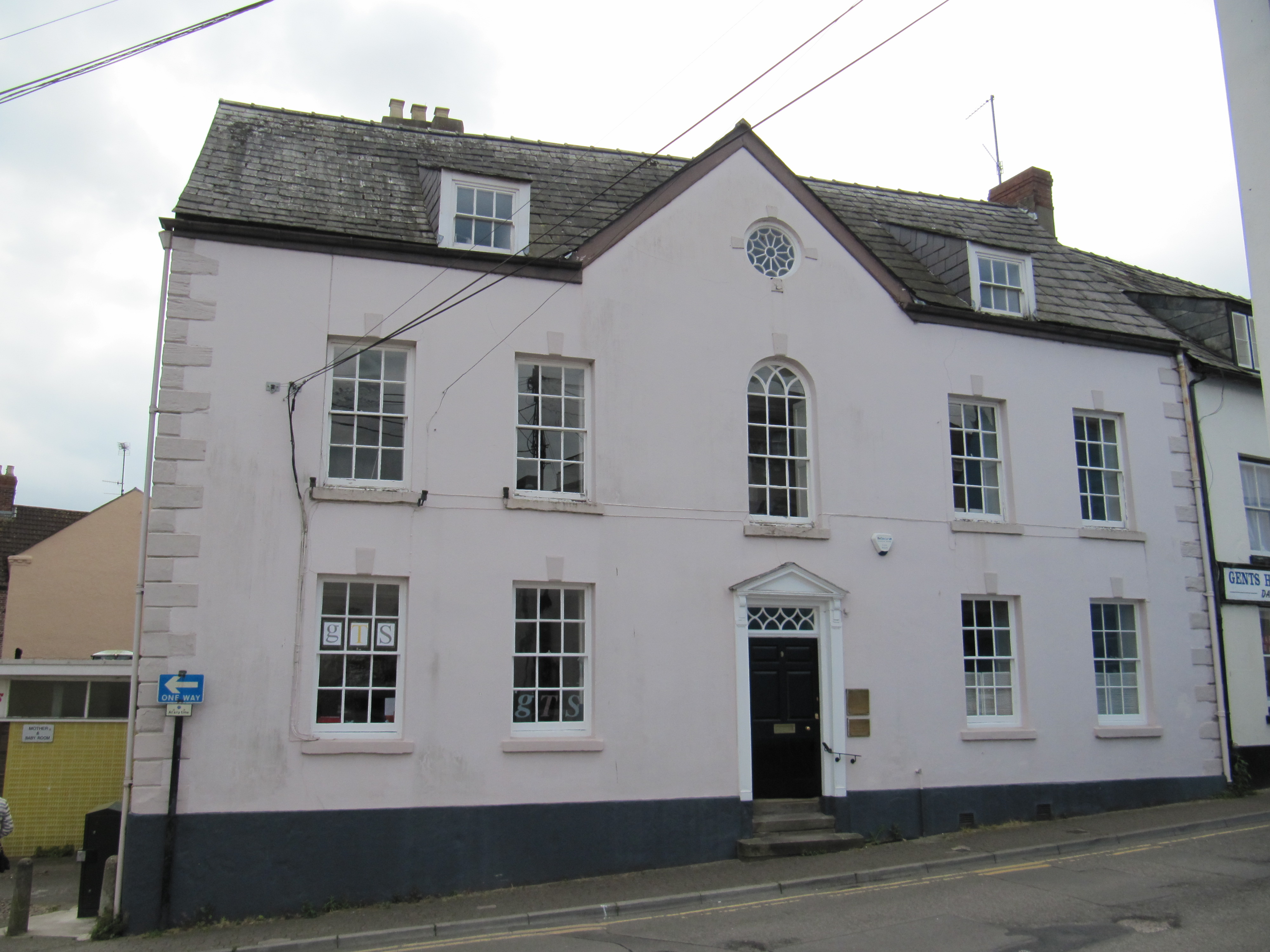
- "No.9, its pediment botched"

- Location within Monmouthshire
- 51.8116°N 2.715°W
- Type: Commercial
- Location: Monmouth, Monmouthshire

History
- Built: C.17th century

Site notes
- Architectural style: Georgian
- Governing body: Privately owned

Listed Building – Grade II*
- Official name: No.9 Agincourt Street
- Designated: 27 June 1952
- Reference no.: 2242

9 Agincourt Street, Monmouth, Wales is a late 17th century townhouse which became the estate office of the agent of the Dukes of Beaufort in the mid 19th century. It is a Grade II* listed building. In commercial use since its construction, it now houses a firm of architects.

== History ==
Cadw suggests a construction date close to 1700. The building was refaced in the 19th century and has since been unaltered externally. During the mid-19th century, the building was owned by the Dukes of Beaufort and used as the estate office for their substantial Monmouthshire land holdings. It was converted by a firm of architects in the late 20th century and now houses their offices. The architects were responsible for the conversion of the nearby Beaufort Arms Hotel.

== Architecture and description ==
The building is rendered, under a roof of Welsh slate. Of two storeys, with an attic, it has a double-front plan. The architectural historian John Newman noted the "botched" pediment while the Monmouth historian Keith Kissack recorded its Grecian fanlight. The interior has a notable dog-leg staircase dating from the late 17th century and a complete early 19th century strong-room, installed when the building was used as a solicitors' office. The building is listed Grade II*.
