= Monmouth Cricket Club =

Personnel
- Captain: Matt Jones
- Chairman: Mike Maguire

Team information
- Founded: 1838 or earlier
- Home ground: Monmouth Sports Ground, Monmouth
- Official website: monmouth.play-cricket.com

Monmouth Cricket Club is based at Monmouth Sports Ground, Chippenham Fields, in Monmouth, Wales.

The club runs junior sides, an U15s, U13s and U11s, which play in the Gwent League.

In 2012, Monmouth rejoined the Cricket Wales pyramid after 20 years having been accepted into the Glamorgan and Monmouthshire League (now the South East Wales Cricket League) in Division Three.

== History ==
Monmouth has had a cricket club since at least 1838. Monmouth was fielding a cricket team from 1835 its members were drawn from the local Monmouth wealthy and their employees. In 1839, when Monmouth played the Forest Of Dean, both sides agreed to draw players from subscribing members only, ending the practice of bringing in crack players for individual matches.

Matches were played on alternate Thursdays. In the early days, it was customary for the home team to entertain and the visitors and also provide a meal between innings. This had a detrimental effect on the players' abilities. After the 1850s the food was served following the game.

The bowling was performed with under arm throwing during the early years. In 1856 Monmouth secured the bowling services of James Lillywhite as a coach and bowler who introduced overarm bowling and according to Keith Kissack was probably related to the Sussex round arm bowler W Lillywhite who pioneered such bowling in the 1830s.

In 1866 Gloucestershire went on tour in to play Ross, Hereford and Monmouth. The tour was intended to encourage Cricket in the Area. The Match was played on the Beaufort Field. The Gloucestershire team included three of the Graces:- G.F. Grace aged 16, W.G. Grace aged 18 and E. M. Grace aged 25. W.G. Grace had recently scored 224 not out against Surrey and the bat he used against Monmouth had a Silver Shield on it recording the achievement. W.G. Grace was bowled first ball by J.S.Hood. According to the Monmouth Beacon, the ball was bowled Knee-high ne plus ultra which implied the ball was bowled under arm.

In 1870 Agincourt Cricket Club was the main Monmouth cricket club in Monmouth which was formed by a breakaway group of the Monmouth Cricket Club. Charles Henry Crompton-Roberts established Monmouth's first cricket ground in Drybridge Park in 1874. In 1874 they beat the Combined Universities XI. In 1875, he staged the first of his Annual Cricket Weeks. The event became very popular and in 1883, thanks to the recent arrival of the railways, Drybridge Park hosted a game between the Combined Universities and the world.

The death of Crompton Roberts in 1891 meant that the ground at Drybridge Park became unavailable. Colonel Walwyn made an unsuccessful attempt to open a ground on Chippenham Park. The Monmouth team then returned to Beaufort Meadow. Interest in Cricket began to wane until 1910 when a local ladies team beat the town team by 55 runs. The Monmouth (Agincourt) Cricket Club was disbanded in March 1914 but friendly Monmouth games continued.

== More recent history ==
Monmouth Cricket Club celebrated back-to-back Marches League Division One titles and Marches Cup crowns in 2003, 2004, and 2005.

After an unprecedented treble double, the club moved to the Worcestershire County League in 2006, achieving promotion from Division Three (South) in its first year.

The club consolidated its place in Division Two for five seasons, narrowly missing out on promotion to Division One in 2010.

Monmouth's members voted to rejoin the Cricket Wales pyramid – after a 20-year exile – for the benefit of its growing junior section.

Having been accepted into the Glamorgan and Monmouthshire League (now the South East Wales Cricket League) for the 2012 campaign, Monmouth finished top of Division Three but the season was declared null and void owing to a rain-ravaged summer.

With support from parents, Cricket Wales and local MP David Davies, then chairman Martin Newell and vice-chairman Ian Morgan secured substantial grant funding for a two-bay outdoor net facility which was built at Monmouth Sports Ground in July 2015.

After a succession of near misses, the club finally gained promotion from the South East Wales Cricket League Division Three in 2017.

The return of experienced players David Teague and Jonathan Roberts from Chepstow, coupled with mature performances from Wales Under-15s duo Harry Friend and Joe Harris and Glamorgan Academy leg-spinner Sam Swingwood, helped Monmouth to a golden summer in 2018. The club clinched promotion from Division Two by winning the title at its first attempt and then managed to achieve a respectable 8th-place finish out of 12 teams in its first season in the top flight.

In 2012, the Kings Head Hotel (J D Westherspoons) sponsored the Monmouth Cricket Club. There is a framed shirt on the wall and the club holds its monthly meetings at the pub.

The children train on Wednesdays throughout the summer at Monmouth Sports Ground.

== Gallery ==
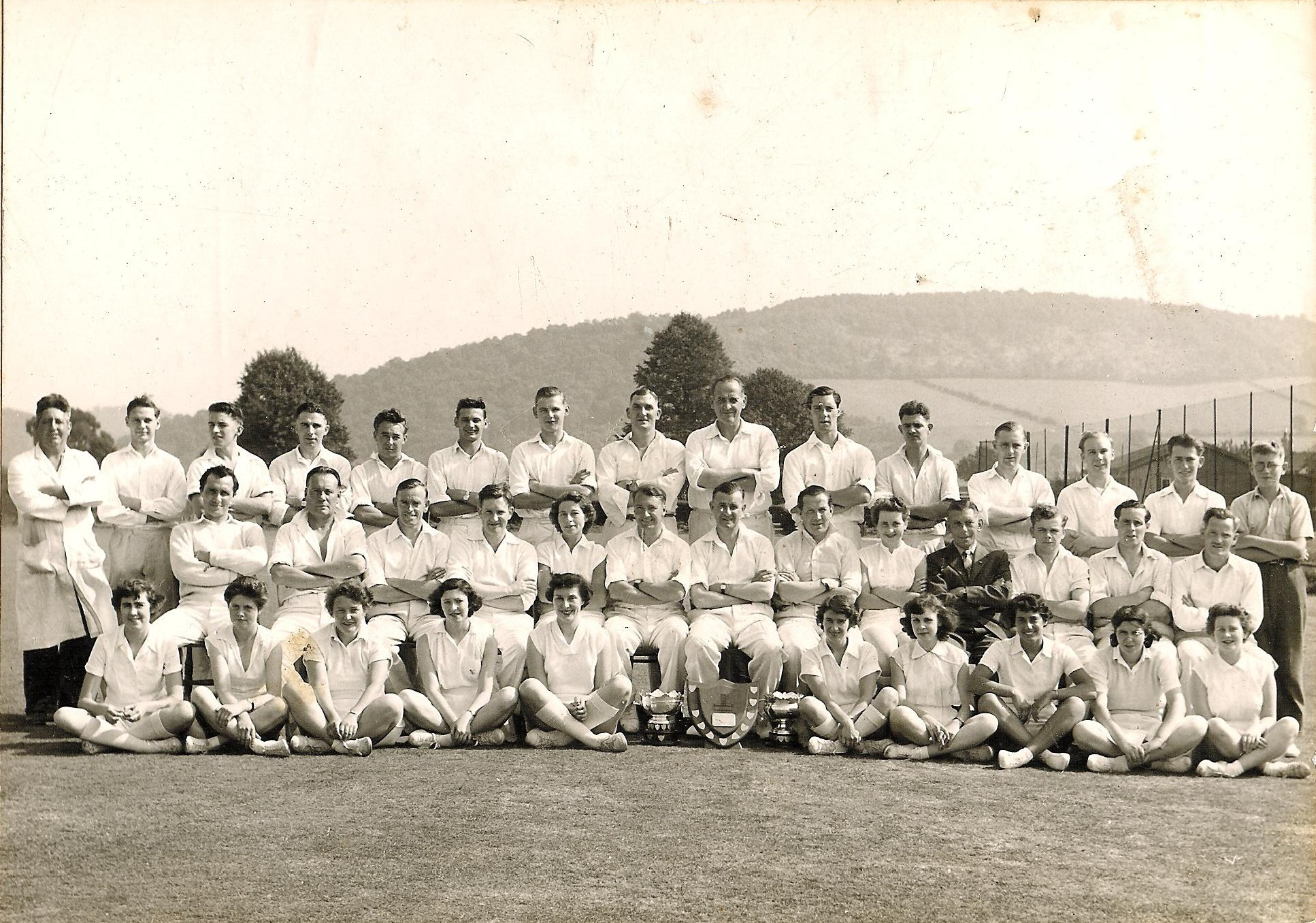
Monmouth Cricket Club Men's and Ladies' Team sometime early to mid-1950s

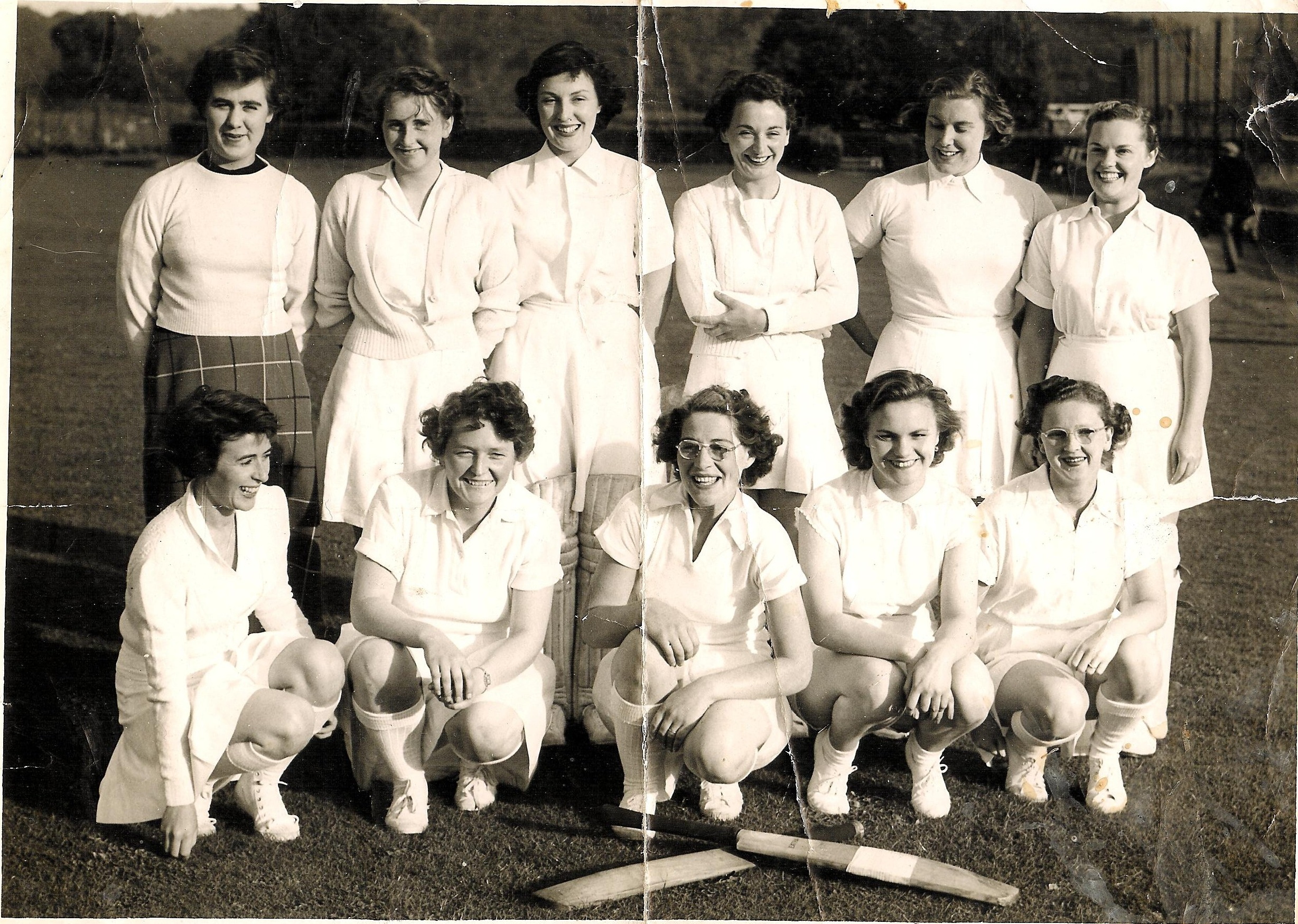
Ladies Cricket Team sometime during the 1950s

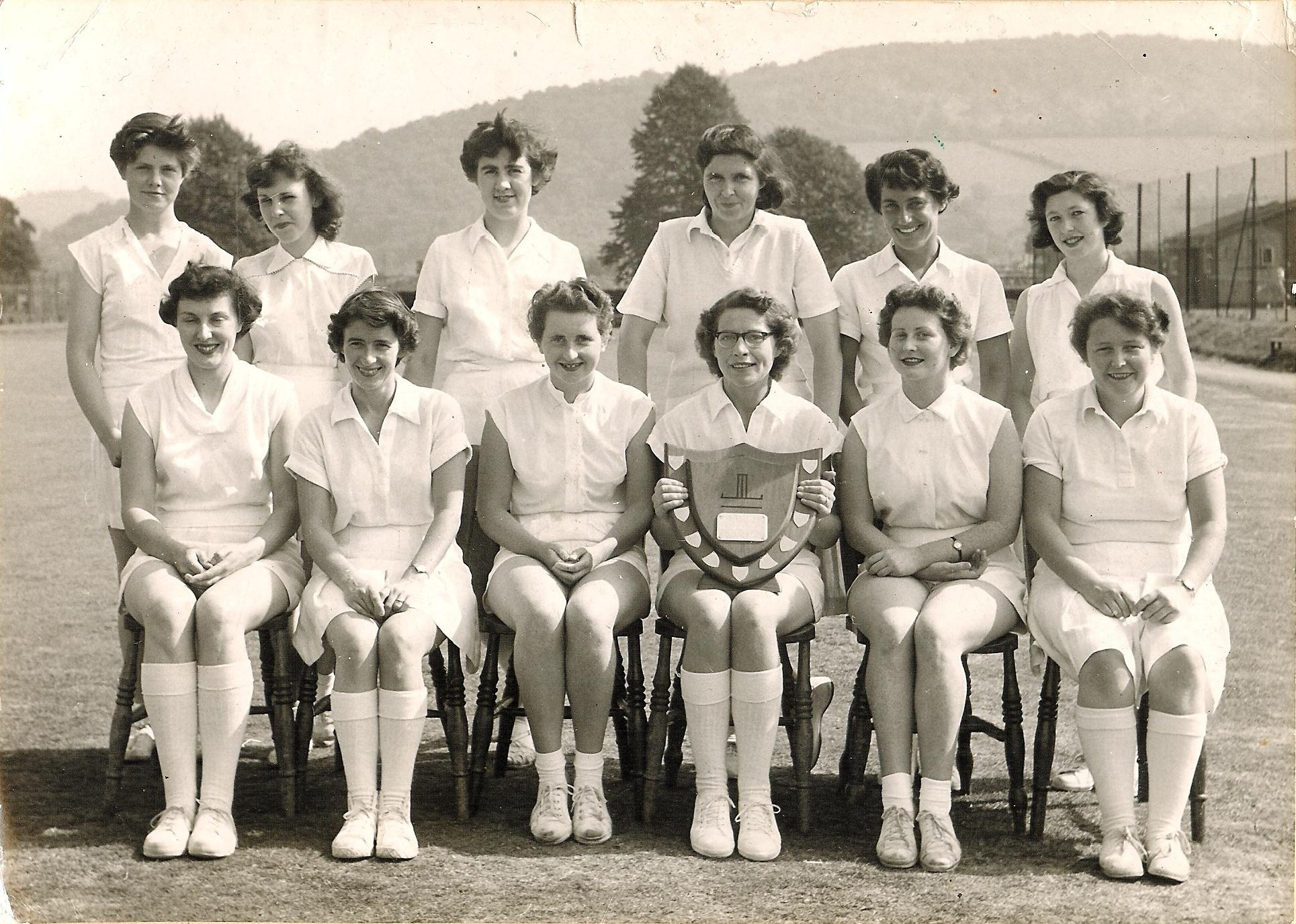
Another Picture of the Ladies Cricket Team sometime during the 1950s

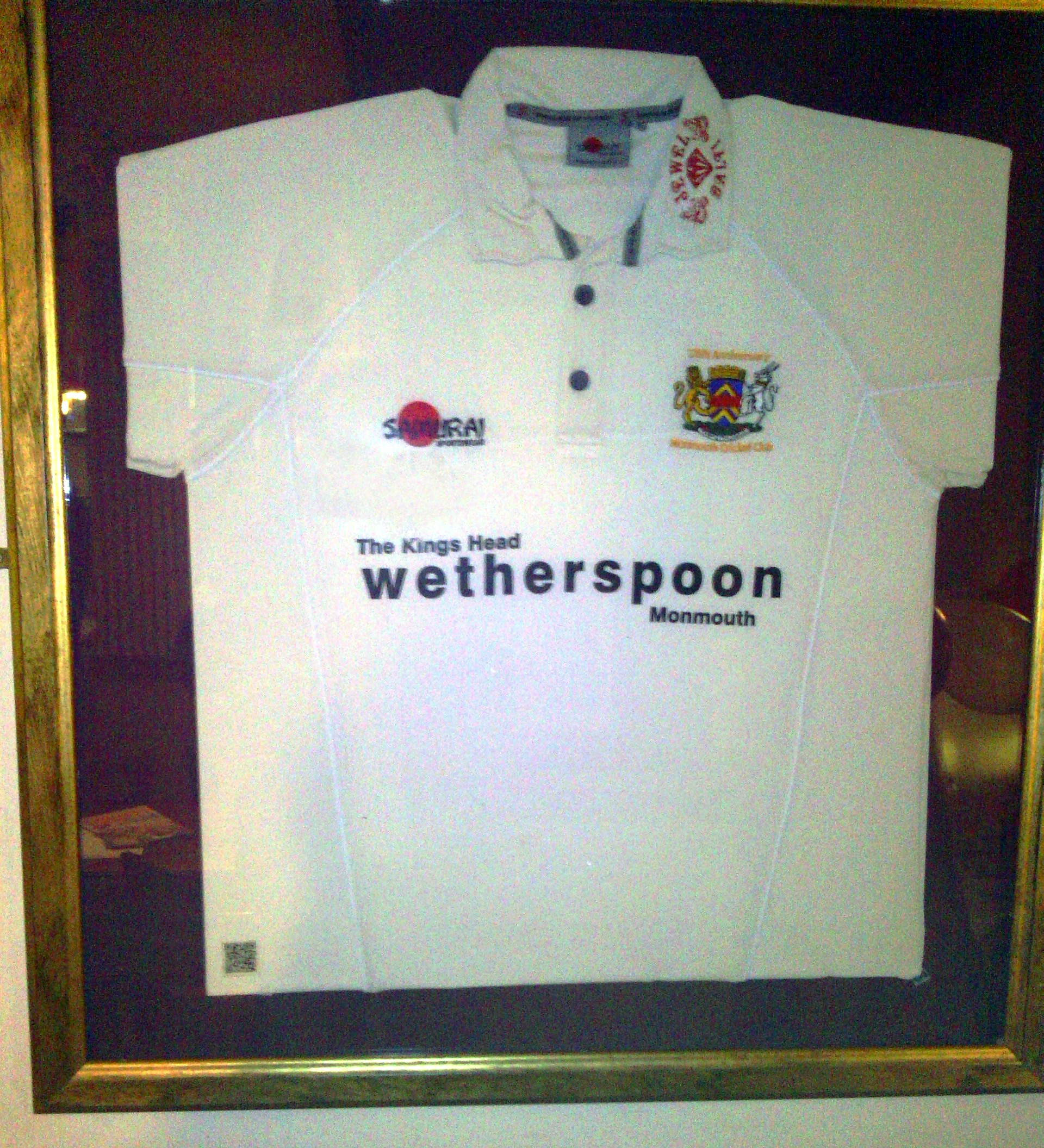
Monmouth Cricket Club shirt displayed at the Kings Head Hotel

== See also ==
- Cricket in Wales
