= Kings Head Hotel, Monmouth =

Kings Head Hotel
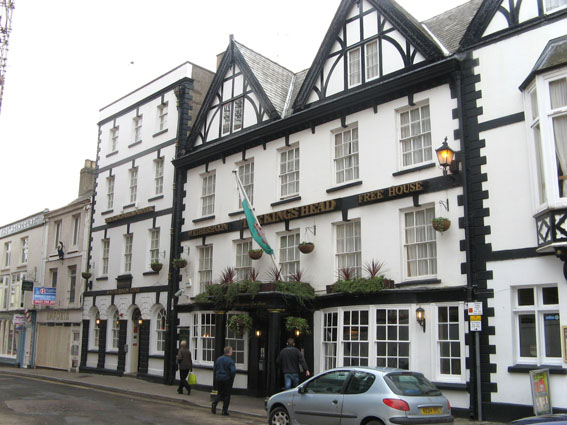

General information
- Type: Posting inn
- Location: Agincourt Square, Monmouth, Wales
- Coordinates: 51.81179°N 2.71575°W
- Current tenants: J D Wetherspoon pub
- Construction started: mid-17th century

Design and construction
- Designations: Grade II* listed

Website
- www.jdwetherspoon.co.uk/home/pubs/the-kings-head

The King's Head Hotel is a hotel standing opposite the Shire Hall in Glyndŵr Street, Agincourt Square, Monmouth, Monmouthshire, Wales. It dates from the mid-17th century, and as one of the major inns in Monmouth was reputedly visited by Charles I of England in 1645. It has a fine black-and-white painted stone façade and became an important posting inn in the late 17th century, with a yard through an archway where visitors' horses could be stabled and where regular coach services called. In the 18th and 19th centuries, stagecoaches for London left from the inn. The range of buildings along Agincourt Street now includes the former Monmouth Bank and the County Club, while the inn itself is now part of the J D Wetherspoon pub chain. It is one of 24 buildings on the town's Heritage Trail and is a Grade II* listed building.

== Architecture and History ==
The bottom side of Agincourt Square is dominated by the 17th century coaching inn, and its attendant buildings form a range along Agincourt Street, although the decorative facades of the former Monmouth Bank (c 1740) on the left, and the County Club (c 1877) are much later buildings. The County Club by Thomas Henry Wyatt has an oriel window. The King's Head runs through to St John's Street, where it had its stabling, and since this spans the outer bailey ditch of the castle it drops a storey from front to back. It became an important posting inn under its landlord Richard Ballard, who was Mayor of Monmouth in 1675 and also its postmaster. An ardent Royalist, Ballard issued brass tokens bearing the head of Charles II with the inscription "God Preserve our Gracious King", and later erected a plaster bas-relief of Charles, above the fireplace in the left-hand bar. Charles I was reputed to have visited it in 1645, during a stay at Raglan Castle. Both John Newman and Keith Kissack describe the bust as being of Charles II, rather than his father, although Kissack concedes that it appears to be an "amalgam" with features of both. Kissack also notes that the bust is a "rather crude, vernacular" copy of a more "professional" version at Great Castle House.

In 1820, William Cobbett, the pamphleteer spoke at the hotel. Cobbett had just stood unsuccessfully as M.P. for Coventry. He was noted for his opposition to paper money and the corn laws and his enthusiasm for parliamentary reform and the rural Englishmen.

In 1835 there were 15 inns and pubs in Agincourt Square, giving rise to the rhyme; "A gin court here, a gin court there, no wonder they call it A-gin-court Square". However, the King's Head Hotel was a degree or two elevated from a gin court, being Monmouth Borough's pre-eminent hostelry until the construction of The Beaufort Arms Hotel on the other side of the Shire Hall. Regular stagecoach services left for Ross, Gloucester, Cheltenham, Oxford and London: even then London was only eighteen hours away. When the railways came to Gloucester in 1840, coach services left the Agincourt Square hotels and reached Gloucester in three hours. Through fares to London at that time were 14s (shillings) 7 d (pence). The railways finally reached Monmouth itself in 1857, to Newport, and in 1873 to Ross and 1875 to Coleford, finally killing off the stagecoach services. In 1840 the hotel had 18 bedrooms, and kept 16 coach horses and several coaches. It caught fire in 1870, but survived in essentially its present form. By the start of the 20th century the hotel still offered posting and livery stables, but also facilities for cycling and motor cars. As at 2025 the Kings Head operates as a Wetherspoons pub and hotel.

In 2011, the Kings Head (J D Westherspoons) sponsored the local cricket club. There is a framed shirt on the wall and the club holds its monthly meetings at the pub. Like dozens of other objects in the pub the cricket team's display is accompanied by a QRpedia code which allows visitors to obtain information on the club in their own language. These were installed in 2012 as part of the "MonmouthpediA" project which provides visitors with information about all aspects of the town.

== Gallery ==
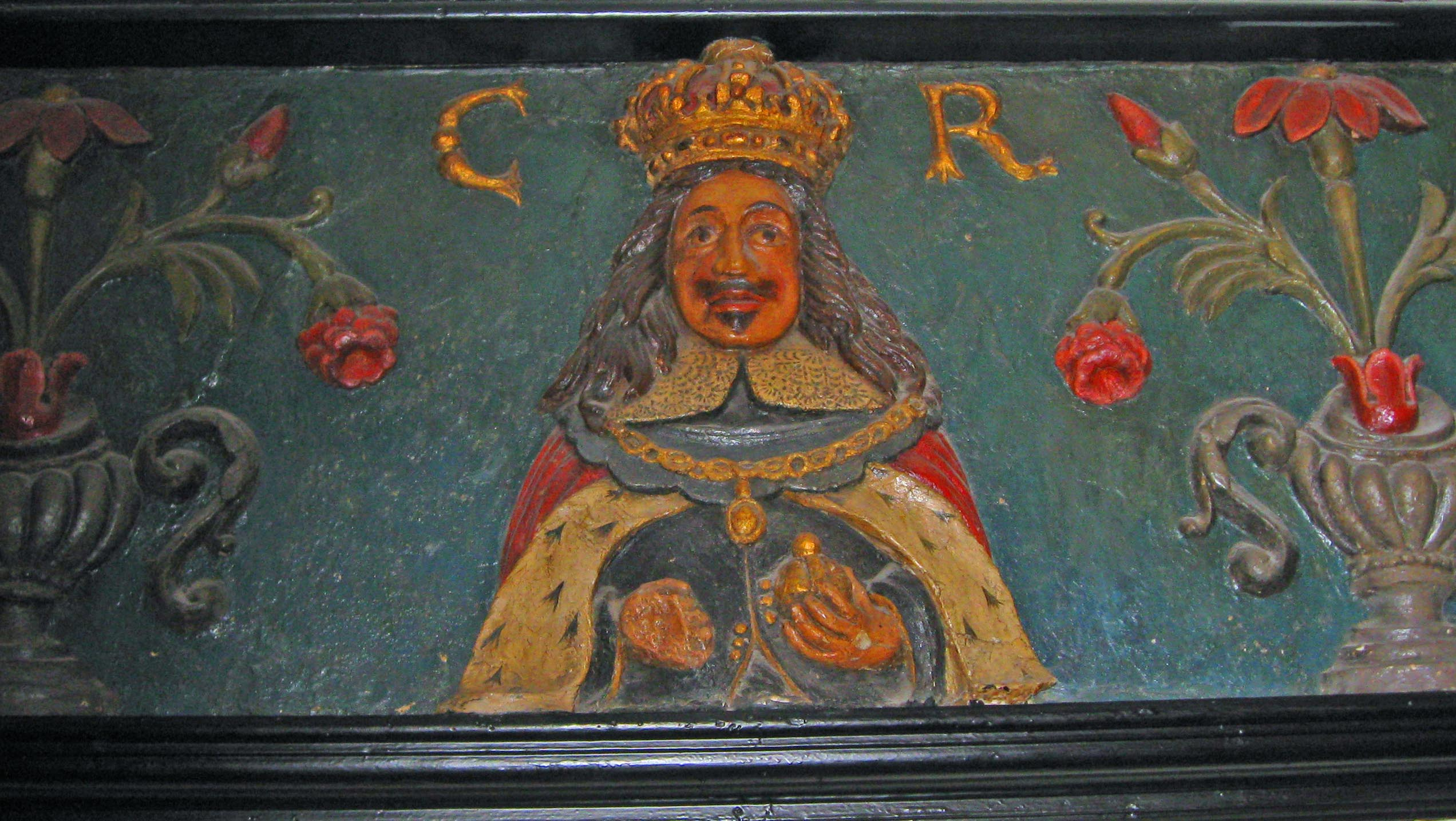
Bust of "Charles II" in the bar

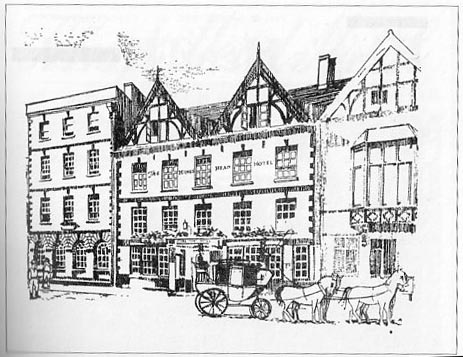
King's Head c. 1900

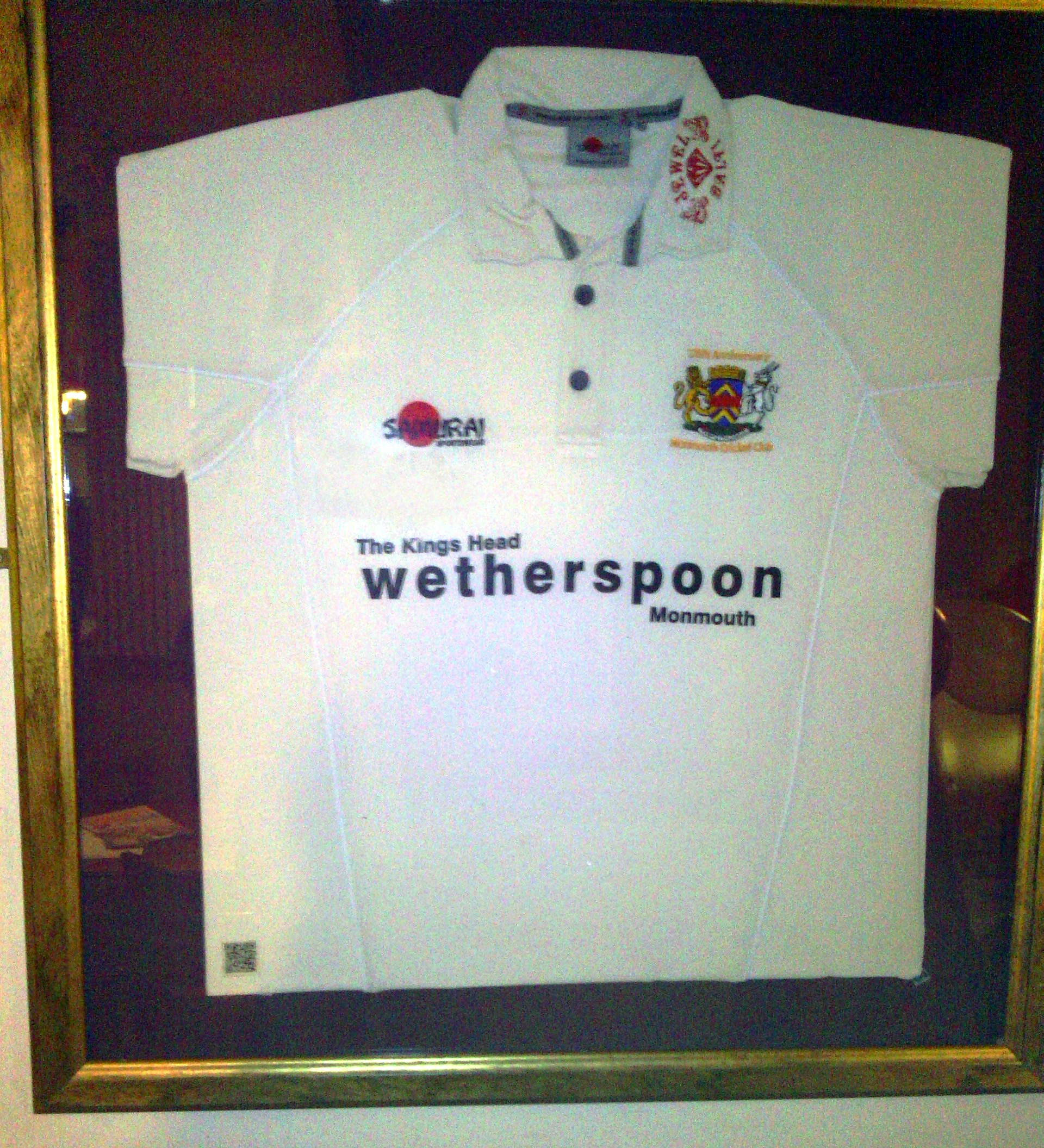
Monmouth Cricket Club shirt in the hotel with a QRpedia code
