= Agincourt House, Monmouth =

17th century building in Monmouth, Wales

Agincourt House
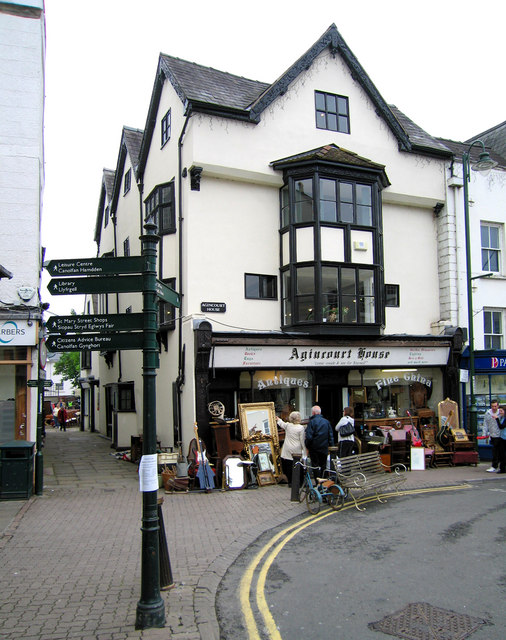
- Agincourt House in 2009; the antiques business has since closed
- Interactive map of the Agincourt House area

General information
- Location: No. 1 Agincourt Square, Monmouth, Wales
- Coordinates: 51°48′44.9″N 2°42′55.0″W
- Construction started: 1624

Agincourt House, No. 1 Agincourt Square, Monmouth, Monmouthshire, Wales is a notable early seventeenth century half-timbered building.

== History ==
The building has been much restored, but the bargeboard over the gable onto Agincourt Square gives a date of 1624. The initials on either side of the date are those of William Roberts, whose grandson rebuilt Drybridge House in Monmouth. John V. Hiling, in his study The Architecture of Wales: From the first to the twenty-first century, considers it one of the two notable Tudor buildings in the town, and notes the two-storey oriel window. Agincourt House is Grade II* listed as at 27 June 1952. It is one of 24 buildings on the Monmouth Heritage Trail.

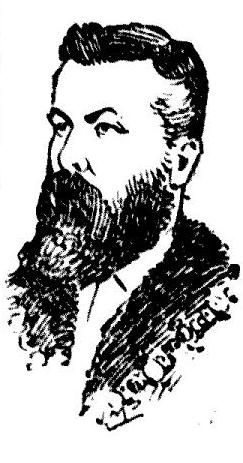
William Honeyfield

A house on the site is shown on John Speed's map of Monmouth Town dated 1610, the street plan on which was to remain unaltered until the 19th century. The present shop frontage is late nineteenth century. From around 1830 to the end of the 19th century it was an ironmongers. In 1830 the proprietor was Josiah Coates, who was also a blacksmith, brazier, and tinplate worker. From the early 1860s to 1883 the proprietor was Joseph Coates, with the words 'Furnishing' and 'Ironmonger' on the shop fascia to either side of the name 'Coates'. He also undertook the duties of blacksmith, but he was also a nailmaker, locksmith, and bellhanger. Joseph Coates (d. 1883) was a chorister and churchwarden at St Mary's Priory Church.

From 1884 the premises were occupied by another Ironmonger, namely William Honeyfield, a prominent citizen in Monmouth who served as mayor between 1891 and 1895. He was also a mason and a member of the bellringers at St Mary's Priory Church, and took part in a 10-part peal of bells recorded on a plaque in the bell tower (Thursday July 1, 1896). In 1919 the premises were occupied by the YMCA, and in the early 1920s by Cash & Co. (boot and shoe makers). The name Cash & Co. may still be seen in the mosaic floor to the front entrance doorway. By 1934 the premises had been taken over by W. & E. Turner Ltd., shoe retailer. 'Le Gourmet', the butchers currently in Church Street, occupied the shop in the 1980s when it closed as a shoe shop. After the butchers moved out the premises were extensively restored and were given an award by Monmouth Civic Society on 16 October 1991. From 1992 up to March 2010 the premises were an antiques shop, and it is now (2012) a clothes shop, with offices on the upper floors.
