= The White Swan Inn, Monmouth =

Building in Monmouth, Wales

The White Swan Inn
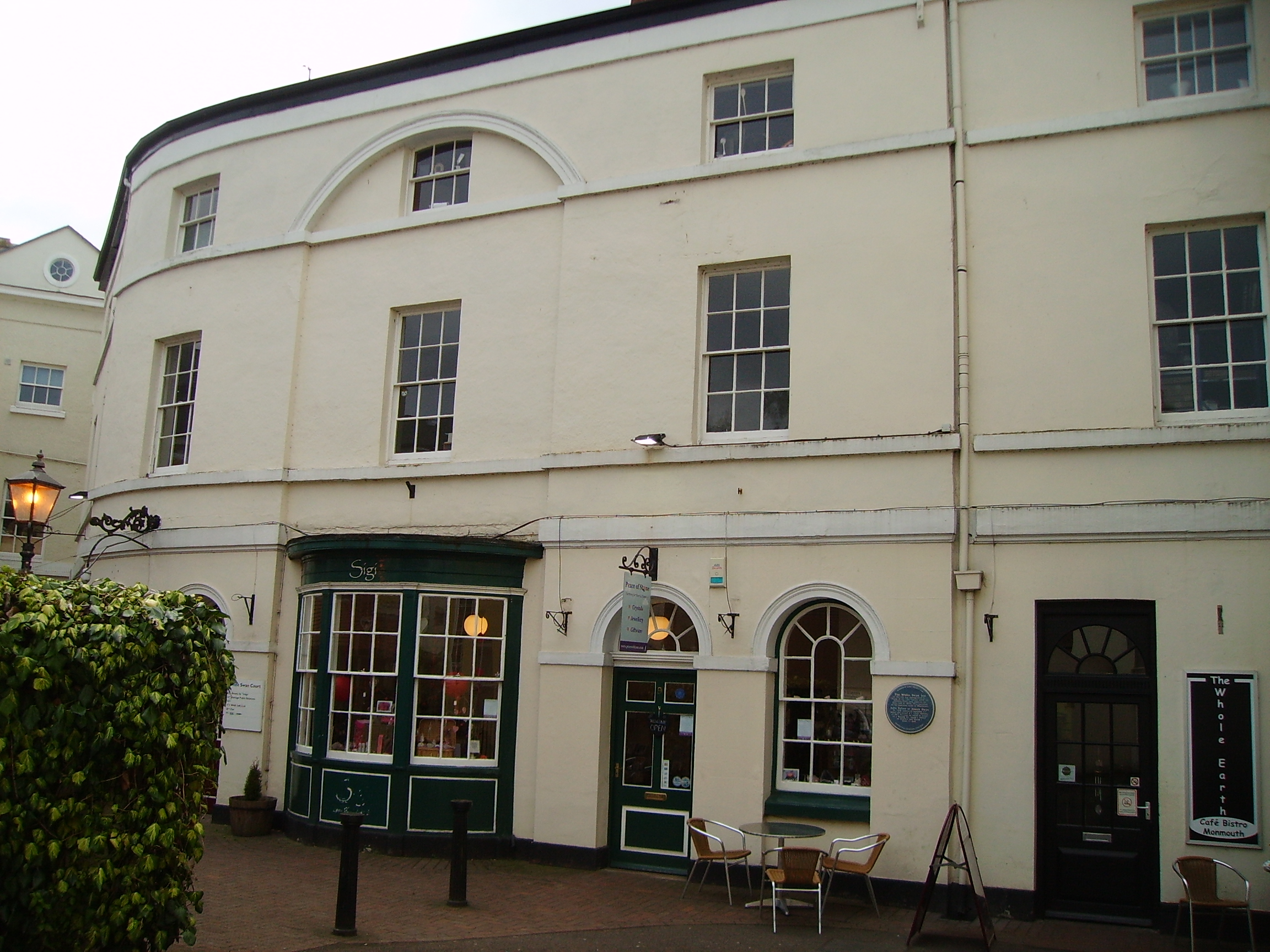
- White Swan Inn
- Interactive map of the The White Swan Inn area

General information
- Location: Monmouth, Wales
- Coordinates: 51°48′46.44″N 2°42′53.86″W
- Completed: 1671

Design and construction
- Designations: Grade II* listed

The White Swan Inn, White Swan Court, Church Street, Monmouth, Monmouthshire, south-east Wales, is an eighteenth-century former coaching inn. The building is Grade II* listed as of 27 June 1952. It is one of 24 buildings on the Monmouth Heritage Trail.

== History ==
The building is of three storeys, with a prominent bay window on the ground floor, and faced with white stucco which dates from the early nineteenth century. There was an earlier inn, the Swan and Falcon, on this site from at least 1709, but by 1774 it was known as the White Swan. The inn, and surrounding court, were rebuilt in 1839, following the redevelopment of Priory Street, a reconstruction to which the prolific Monmouth architect George Vaughan Maddox contributed. It had a coach entrance from Priory Street when the new by-pass was built, and this archway provides one entrance to what is now White Swan Court, with the other entrance from narrow Church Street. The name probably refers to Mary de Bohun, who gave birth to Henry V in Monmouth Castle – the heraldic badge of the Bohun family was the Bohun swan, a swan collared and chained.

The White Swan was appropriated for a billet by a Troop of the 12th Lancers when the Chartist Trials took place in the Shire Hall in 1840. This event caused great consternation amongst the "respectable folk" of the town who feared a revolution and thought that the Lancers were there to protect them. The hotel continued until the late 1950s, and its lead sign of a swan was still displayed here until stolen some years ago. Now the courtyard provides for a pleasant collection of shops, a coffee house and a cafe bistro. In Church Street, the rather irregular bow window to the chemists by the entrance to White Swan Court, which the poet laureate John Betjeman said "must never be demolished".
