= Shire Hall, Monmouth =

Shire Hall
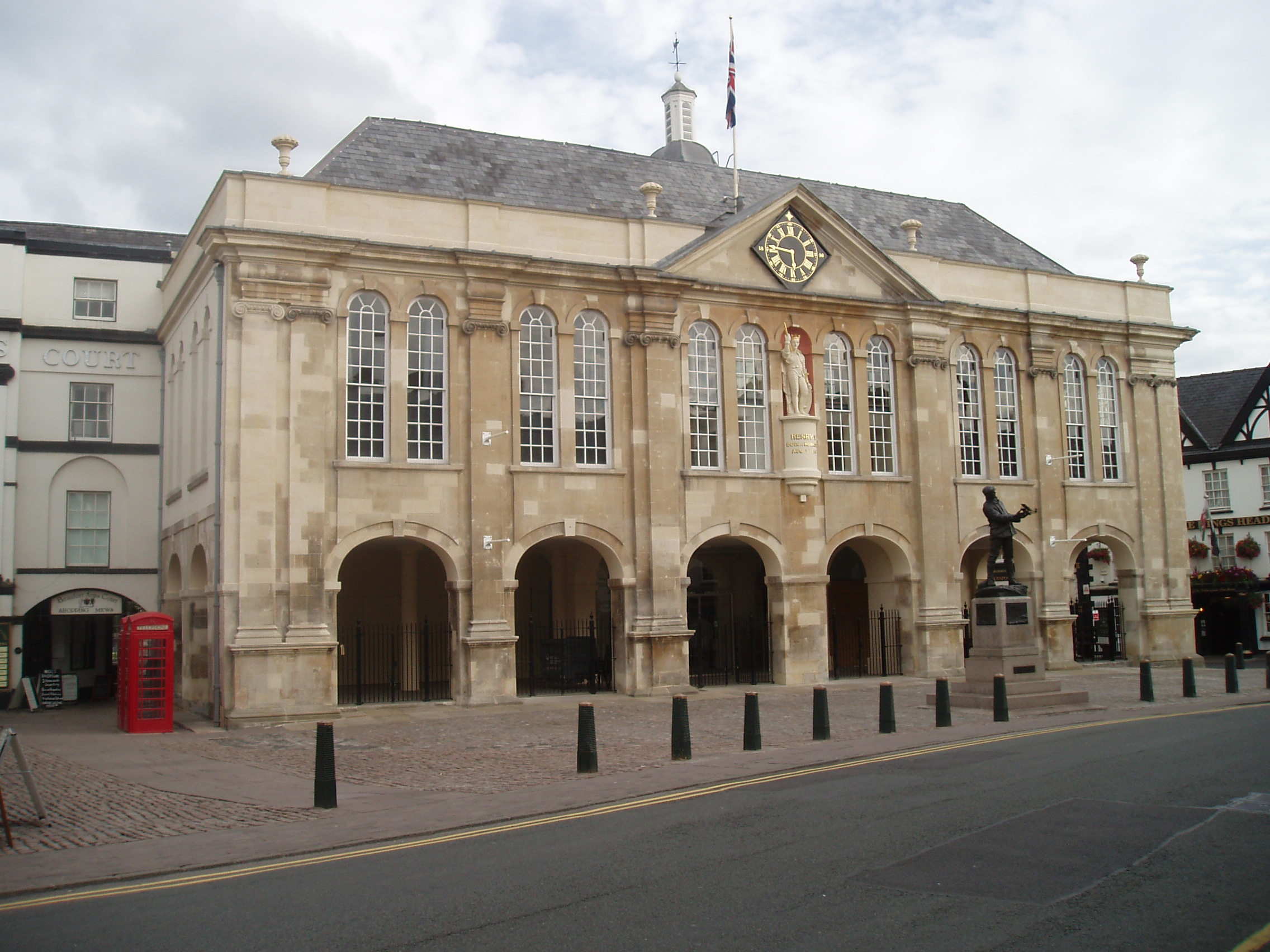
- Shire Hall, Monmouth
- Interactive map of the Shire Hall area

General information
- Architectural style: Baroque
- Location: Agincourt Square, Monmouth, Wales
- Coordinates: 51.811973°N 2.715404°W
- Completed: 1724
- Cost: £1,700

Design and construction
- Architects: Philip Fisher, Bristol
- Designations: Grade I listed

The Shire Hall, Monmouth, Wales, is a prominent building on Agincourt Square in the town centre. It was built in 1724, and was formerly the centre for the assize courts and quarter sessions for Monmouthshire. The building was also used as a market place. In 1839–40, the court was the location of the trial of the Chartist leader John Frost and others for high treason for their part in the Newport Rising.

The building is attributed to Philip Fisher (1702-1776). Fisher is not a well-documented architect, and Cadw notes that the Shire Hall is his only recorded building. The hall was extended by Thomas Hopper and Edward Haycock Sr. in the middle of the 19th century. Cadw describes the building as a “exceptionally fine example of provincial Baroque”. It is a Grade I listed building.

The Shire Hall is owned by Monmouthshire County Council. It is currently used as a tourist information centre and as the offices for Monmouth Town Council, and parts are open to the public. Following the COVID-19 pandemic in the United Kingdom, the council announced that the Shire Hall would be the new location for the Monmouth Museum. At the time, the museum was located in the Market Hall on Priory Street. The five-year project, supported by the National Lottery Heritage Fund, will see a new museum open at the hall by 2027.

== History ==
The current building was erected in 1724, and is at least the fourth building on the site. It had earlier been the site of an Elizabethan court built in 1536, which in turn was replaced in 1571 by a timber-framed construction. The timbers from the original building were used in the construction of the Shire Hall, which provided an open trading area on the ground floor with rooms above. The building, described in Buildings of Wales as "a mighty affair", was designed by a little-known architect, Philip Fisher (d. 1776) of Bristol at a cost of £1,700. The Courts of Assize were transferred to the building in 1725, with the court room itself located on the first floor above the open arches which were used as a market area. The clock in the pediment was made by Richard Watkins in 1765.

The building was extended and remodelled by Thomas Hopper and Edward Haycock Sr. in 1828.

=== Sculpture of King Henry V ===
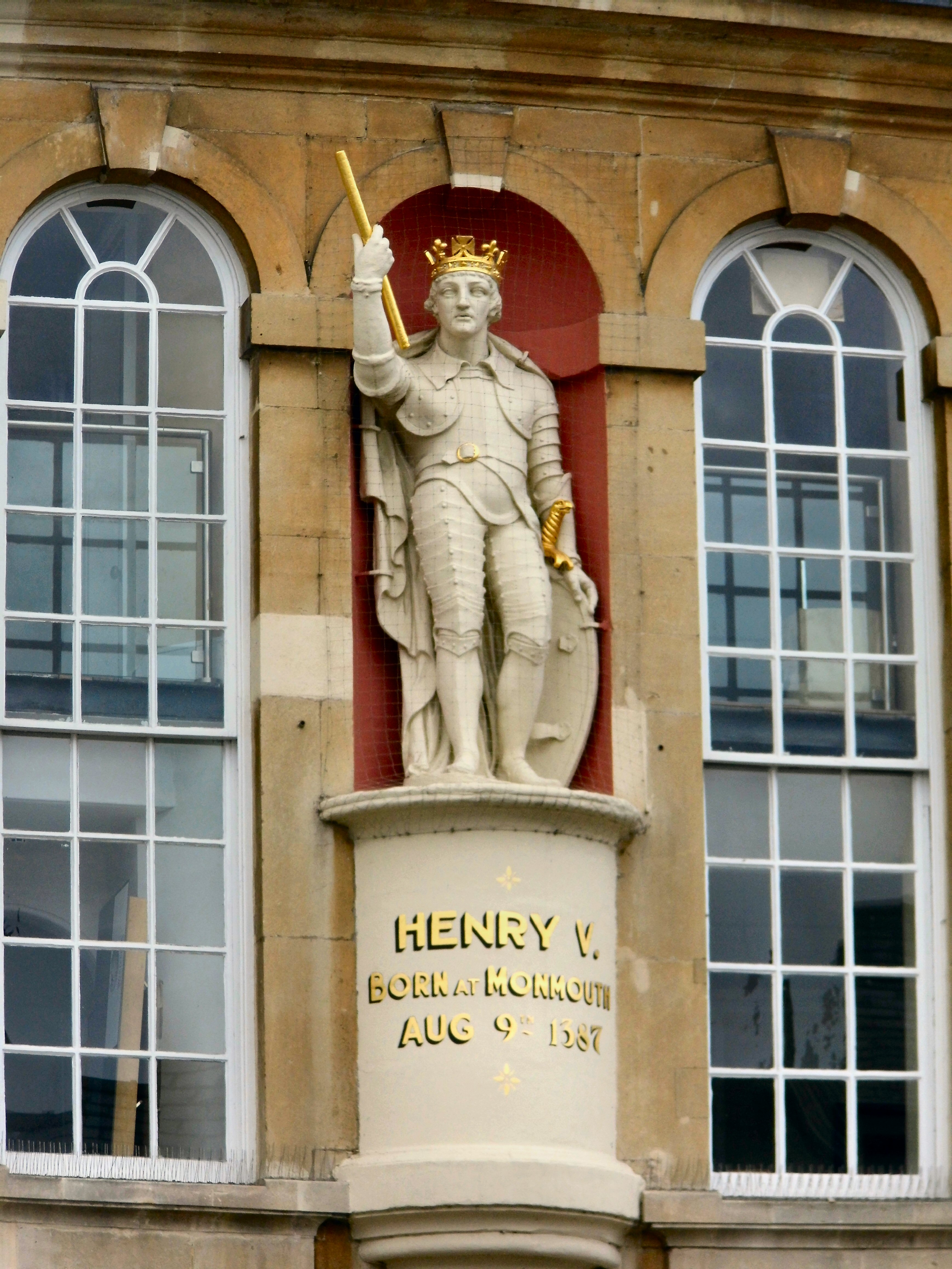
Statue of Henry V

The sculpture of King Henry V, in a niche above the front entrance and below the clock, was added in 1792. The sculptor was Charles Peart, who was born at nearby English Newton. It is generally thought to be of decidedly poor quality; John Newman considered it "incongruous", Jo Darke called it "decidedly-bad", while the local historian Keith Kissack attacked it in two separate books, describing it as, "rather deplorable", and "pathetic...like a hypochondriac inspecting his thermometer". The inscription reads: HENRY V, BORN AT MONMOUTH, AUG 9TH 1387. The carved birth date is now recognised as incorrect.

=== Trial of the Chartist leaders ===
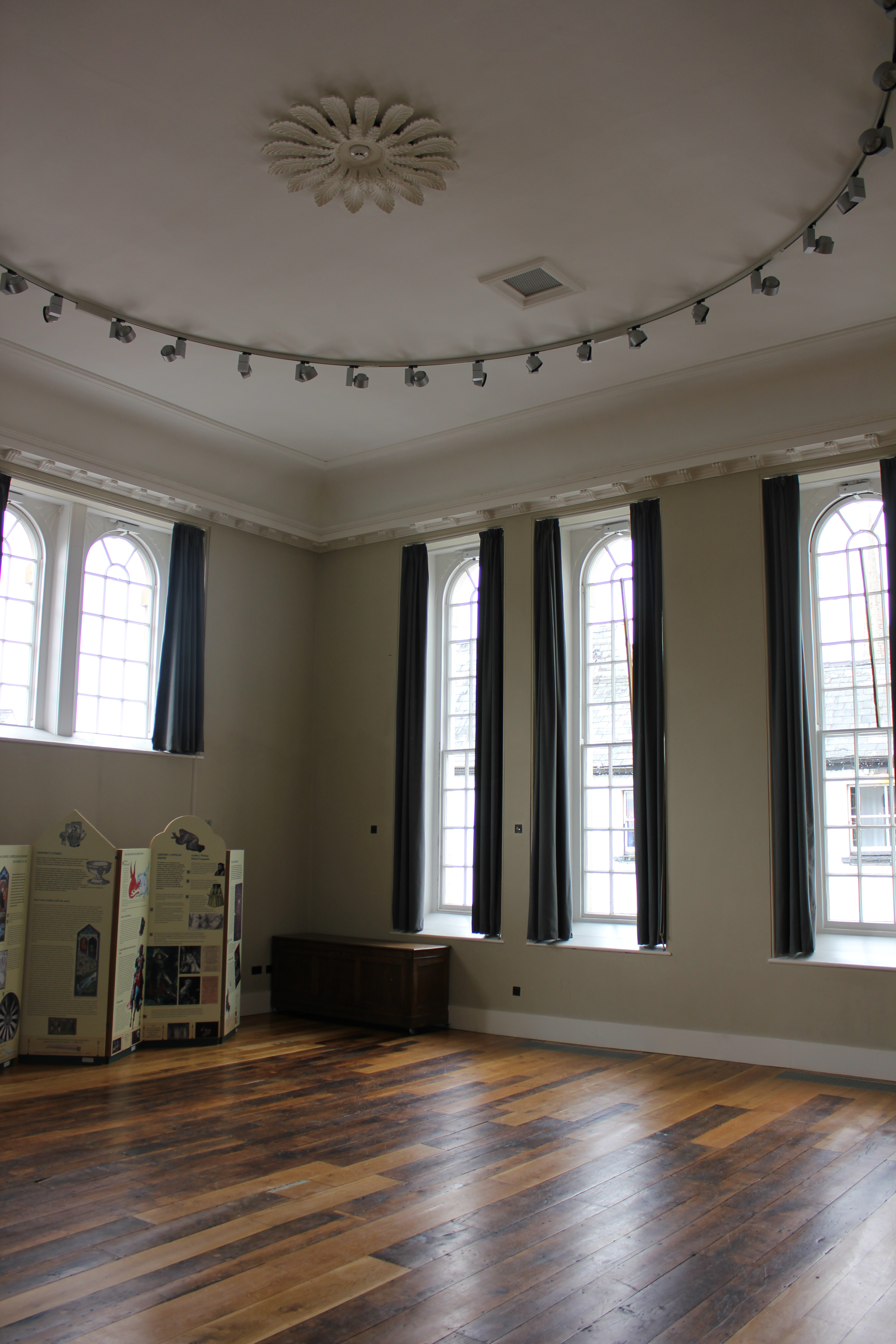
Courtroom two

The County Gaol was located a short distance from the court rooms. It was here that the Chartist leader Henry Vincent, who had sought the right of all men to vote in parliamentary elections, was imprisoned before being tried at the assizes. Vincent was convicted, but the unpopularity of the verdict led to protests that eventually led to miners being killed in a clash with the military at Newport on 4 November 1839. John Frost was arrested in Newport shortly after the riot, followed by other leaders of the group. A Special Commission opened at Shire Hall on 10 December 1839, and an appointed Grand Jury considered what charges to bring against them. The Grand Jury included Lord Granville Somerset, brother of the Duke of Beaufort; John Etherington Welch Rolls; Octavius Morgan; and four Members of Parliament, Joseph Bailey, William Addams Williams, Reginald James Blewitt, and Sir Benjamin Hall. Frost, William Jones, Zephaniah Williams and five others were duly charged with high treason, and their trial began on 31 December. It has been described as "one of the most important treason trials in the annals of British law". The judges were the Lord Chief Justice, Sir Nicholas Tindal; Sir James Parke; and Sir John Williams, who was notorious for sentencing the Tolpuddle Martyrs to transportation in 1834. Counsel for the Crown was the Attorney General, Sir John Campbell; Frost's counsel was Sir Frederick Pollock.

While the trial was taking place, measures were taken to protect Monmouth against Chartist insurgents. Troops were billeted at the White Swan, and some were stationed at the gatehouse on the Monnow Bridge. Granville Somerset and Benjamin Hall spoke in Frost's defence, and, in his summing up, Lord Chief Justice Tindal drew attention to the complete certainty needed for a conviction, suggesting his desire for an acquittal. All eight men were found guilty, but the jury added a recommendation for mercy. On 16 January 1840, the judge sentenced Frost, Jones and Williams to be hanged, drawn and quartered; they were the last men in Britain to be sentenced to that punishment. The other five men were sentenced to transportation. On the day before they were due to be executed, 29 January, the Cabinet under Lord Melbourne took the advice of Lord Chief Justice Tindal, and asked Queen Victoria to reduce all the sentences to transportation. On 2 February 1840, the prisoners were escorted to Chepstow, and put on the steamer Usk for Portsmouth, where they were transferred to the ship Mandarin with over 200 other prisoners and taken to Van Diemen's Land.

=== 20th and 21st centuries ===
When Monmouthshire County Council was formed in 1889, most of its functions were based at Shire Hall, Newport, which by then was the county's main centre of population, rather than at Monmouth.

The magistrates' court at Shire Hall, Monmouth, closed in 1997, and the county court closed in 2002. Monmouthshire County Council then applied to the Heritage Lottery Fund for resources, and secured a grant of £3.2 million towards the building's complete refurbishment, with further funding of over £1 million provided by the county council. Renovation started in late 2008, and the restored building was opened in September 2010. Among the areas open to visitors is the courtroom in which the trial of Frost and others took place in 1840. A key element of the refurbishment was the installation of a lift, which makes the whole building accessible for all. The building now contains a Tourist Information Centre and offices, it is open to the public seven days a week from 10am – 4pm from April to September and is closed on Sundays in winter.

Following the COVID-19 pandemic in the United Kingdom, the council announced that the Shire Hall would be the new location for the Monmouth Museum. At the time, the museum was located in the Market Hall on Priory Street The five-year project, supported by the National Lottery Heritage Fund, will see a new museum open at the Shire Hall by 2027. The Market Hall site will be let as commercial premises. The Shire Hall was closed in December 2025, at the commencement of the redevelopment programme, with the town council relocating to the library at the Rolls Hall.

== Architecture ==
The new Shire Hall was built in 1724. The design is attributed to Philip Fisher, of whom little is known. (Note: Cadw notes that a portrait of Fisher is held at the Shire Hall and that a memorial plaque exists at St Mary's Priory Church.) Cadw suggests that the Shire Hall is his only recorded building, and notes that he would have designed it aged only 22. It is constructed of Bath stone ashlar in a style described as Wren Baroque. (Note: Cadw suggests that the style is old-fashioned for its date, Christopher Wren having died in the year before the building's construction.) A rectangular block of two storeys, the ground floor level is open under an arcade, for the accommodation of market stalls. A clock is set centrally in a decorated pediment. The roof is of Welsh slate with a cupola.

The interior of the building was remodelled in 1828, and a new exterior stair tower with a glazed lantern was added, enclosing a grandiose new staircase. The work was undertaken by Thomas Hopper and Edward Haycock Sr. who extended the Shire Hall building along Agincourt Street, creating room for a new staircase and larger courts. Hopper took up residence in Monnow Street in Monmouth while this was happening.

The Shire Hall is a Grade I listed building. Its Cadw listing record describes it as an "exceptionally fine example of provincial Baroque architecture and one of the two finest secular buildings in Monmouth". (Note: The other is Great Castle House.)

== Surroundings ==
Immediately in front of the Shire Hall stands a Statue of Charles Rolls, the locally born motoring and aviation pioneer to commemorate his life achievements, it was unveiled in 1911. The Kings Head Hotel stands opposite, which dates from the mid-17th century and was reputedly visited by Charles I of England in 1645. Other notable buildings in the square include the Beaufort Arms, a former coaching inn dating from the early eighteenth century, the Punch House, another former coaching inn and Agincourt House, a notable early seventeenth century half-timbered building. The Shire Hall and surrounding area were used as a filming location for the 2008 Doctor Who Christmas special.

== Gallery ==
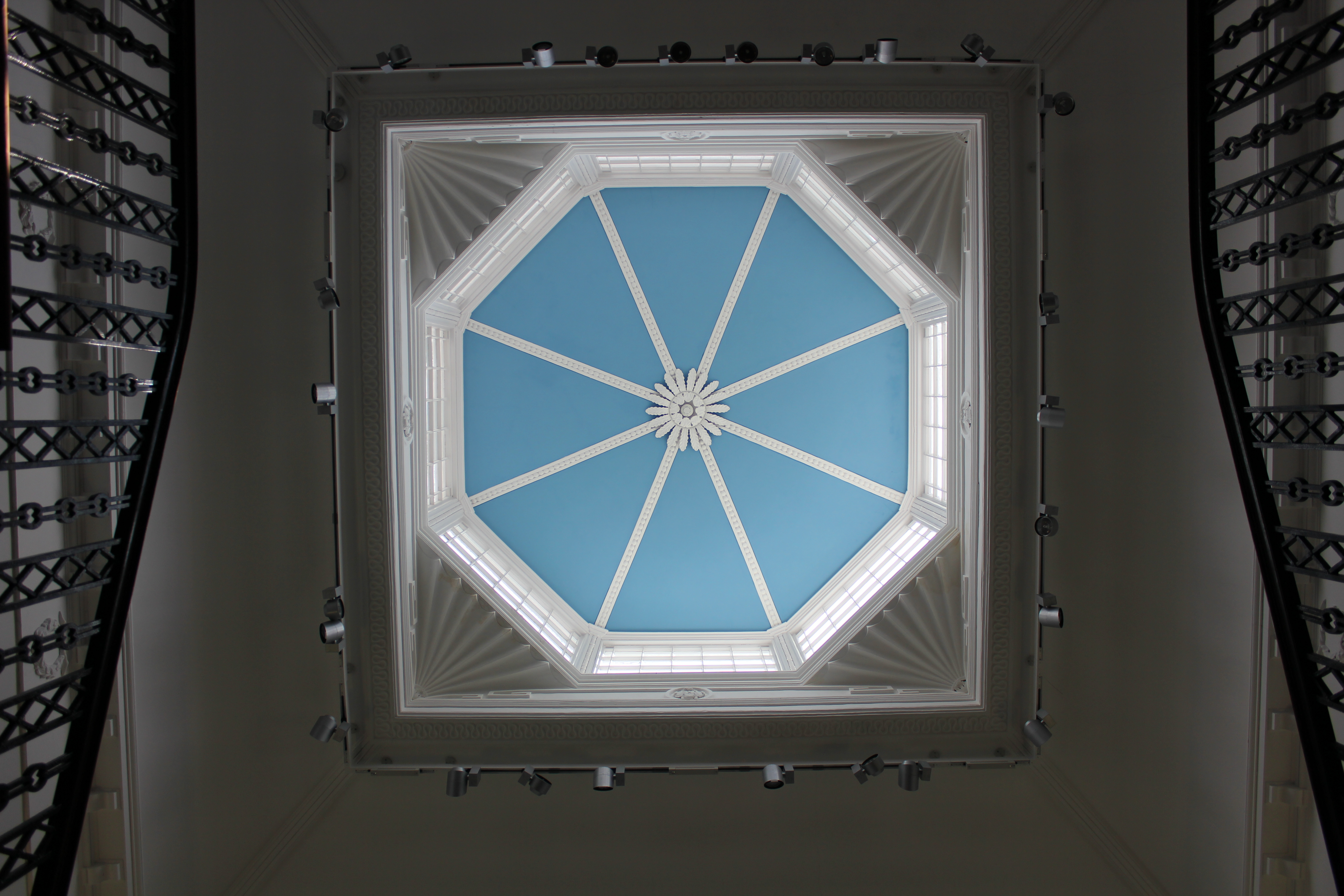
The lantern from below

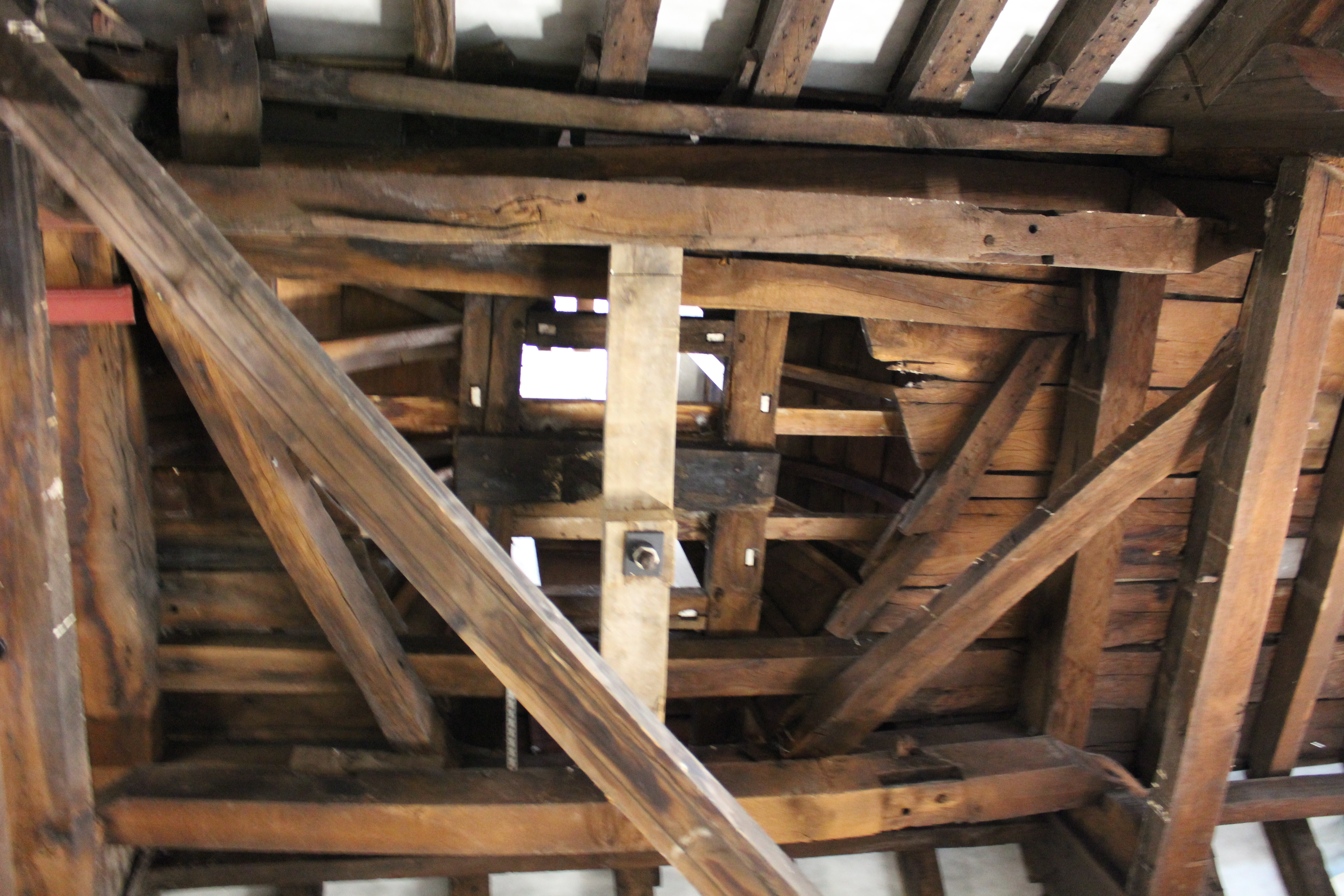
The loft

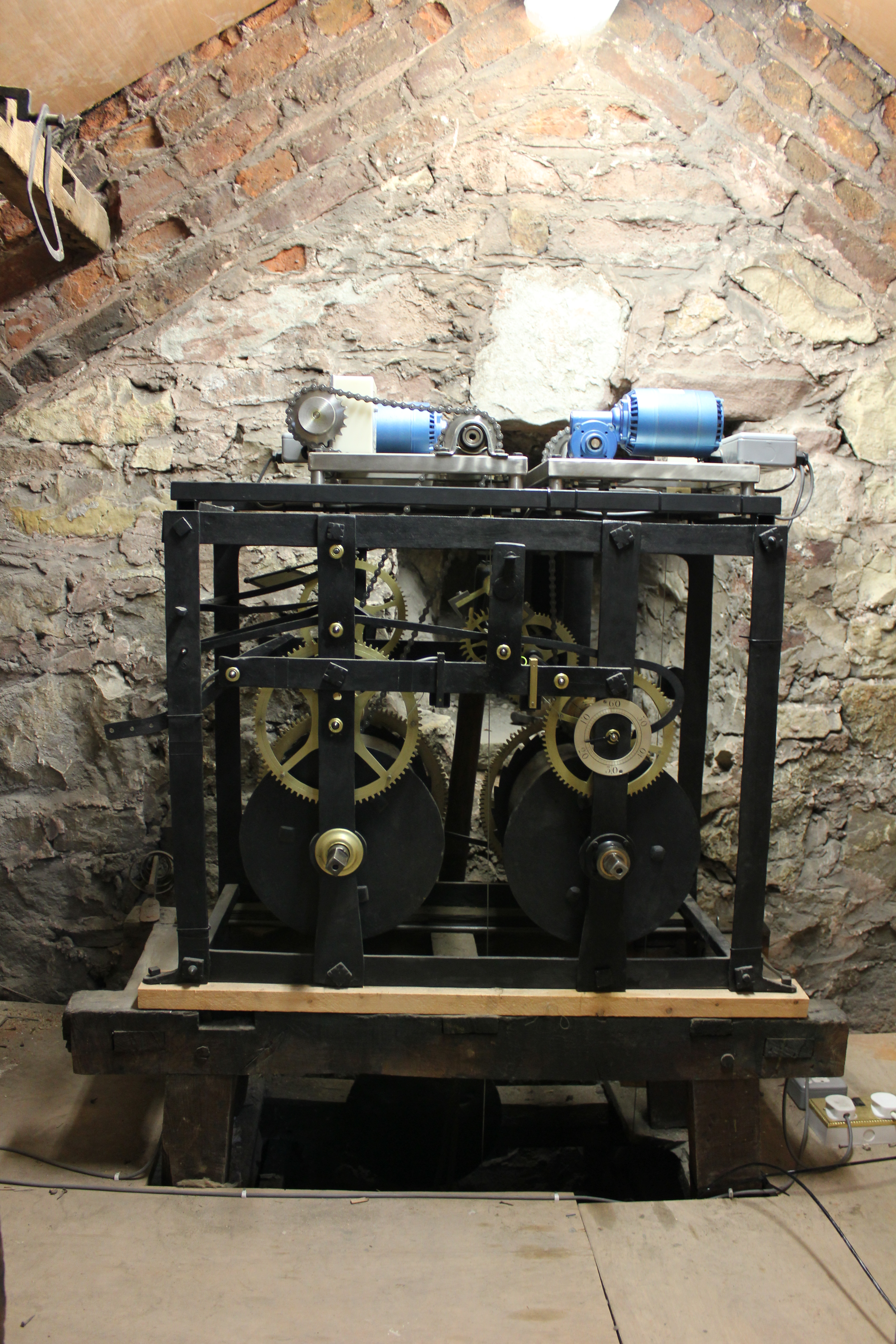
clock mechanism

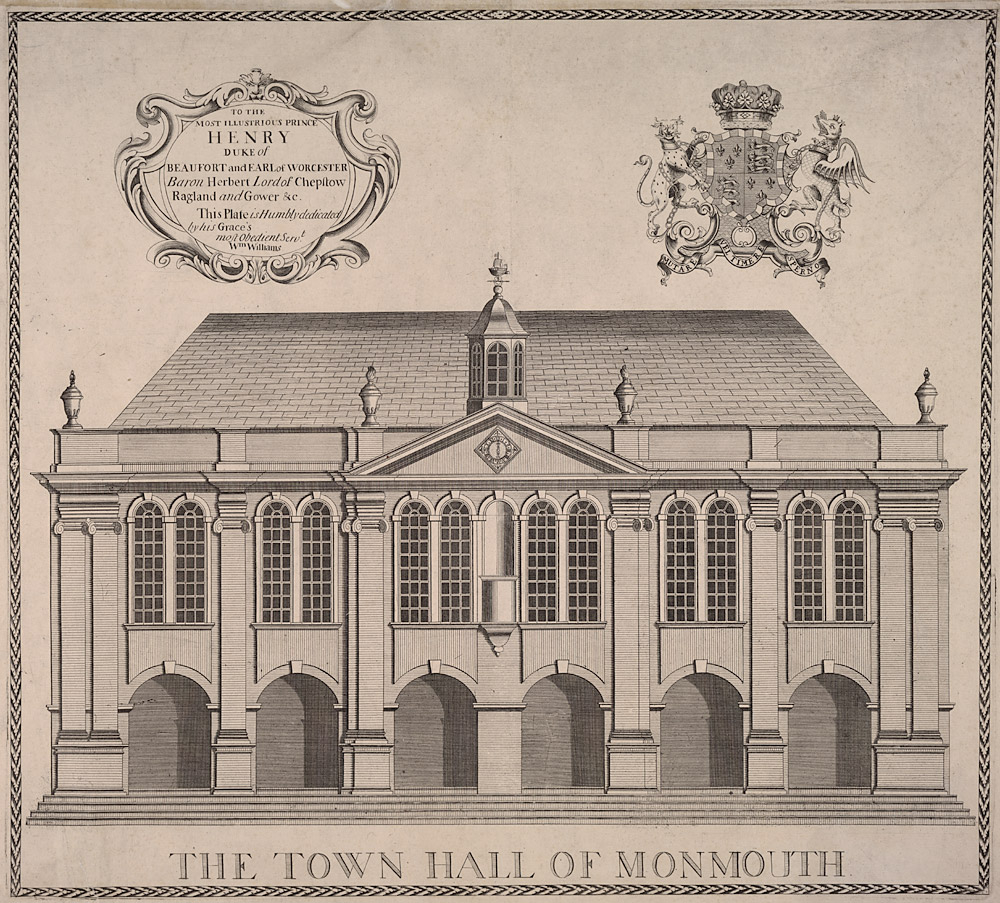
Plate / plan by William Williams c. 1750

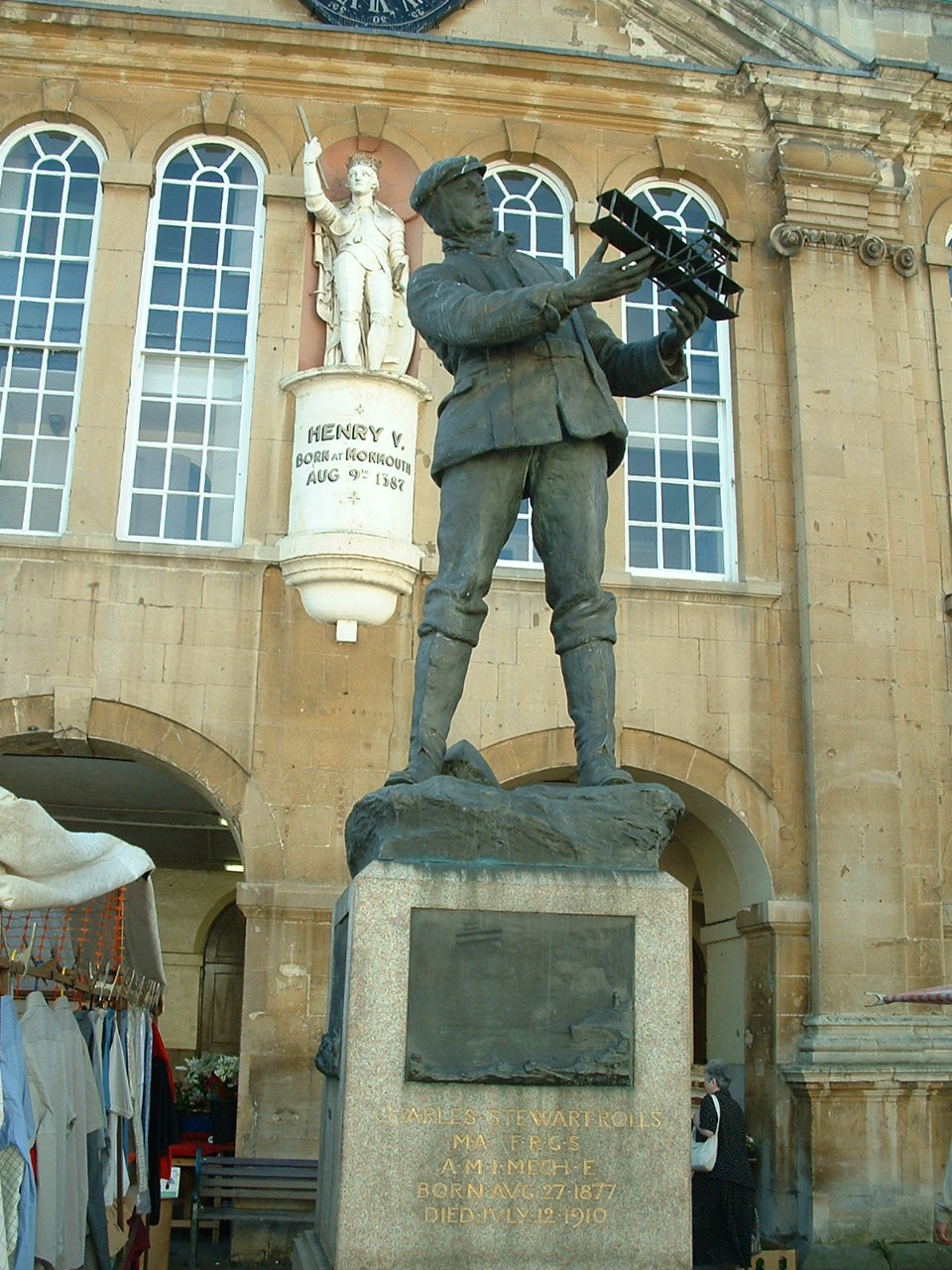
The Charles Rolls memorial statue

== See also ==
- List of former county courts in Wales

== Sources ==
- Darke, Jo (1991). The Monument Guide to England and Wales: A National Portrait in Bronze and Stone. London: MacDonald and Co. OCLC 1008240876.
