= Beaufort Arms Hotel, Monmouth =

Beaufort Arms Hotel
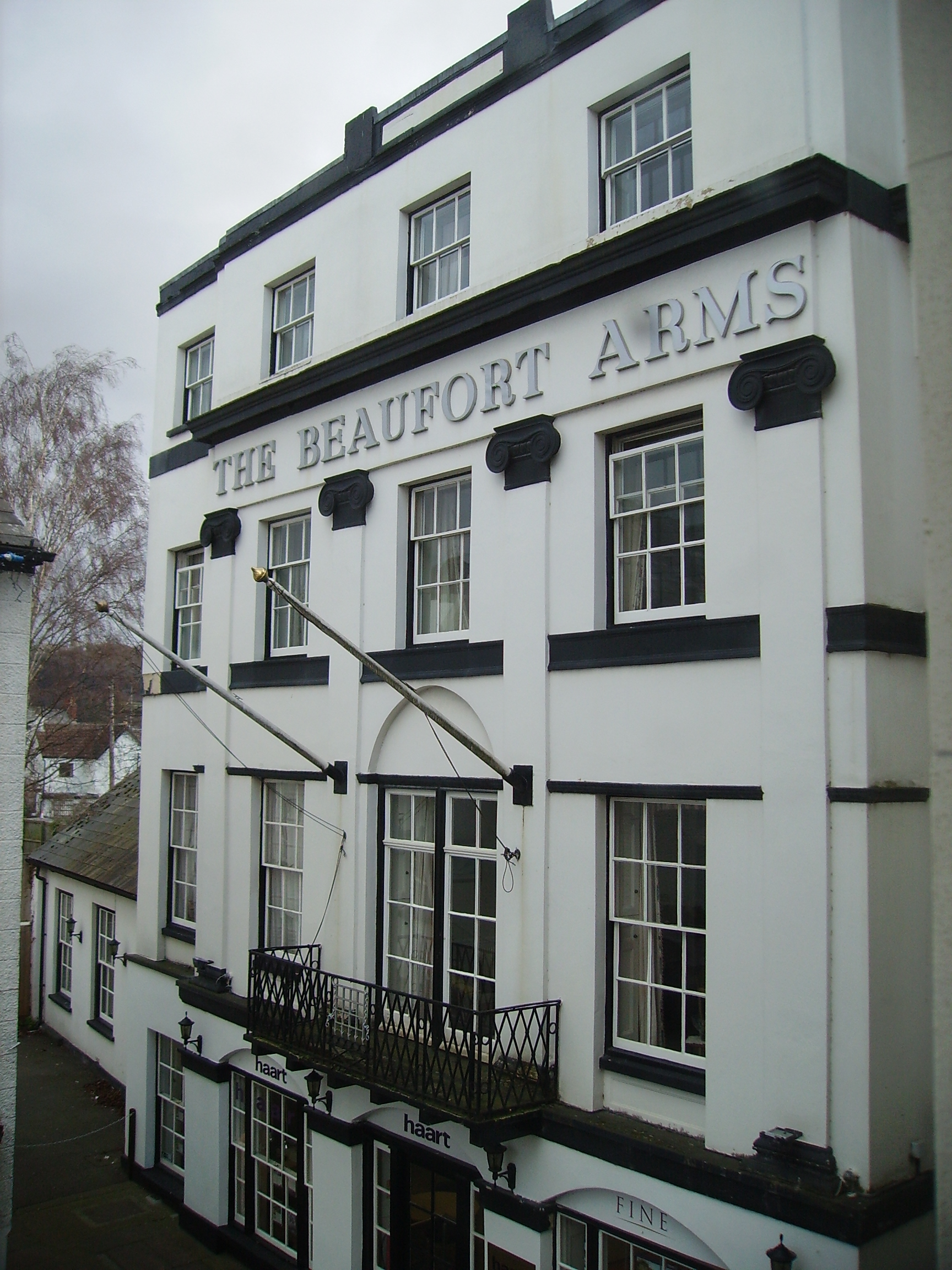
- The Beaufort Arms Hotel
- Interactive map of the Beaufort Arms Hotel area

General information
- Location: Agincourt Square, Monmouth, Wales
- Coordinates: 51°48′43.46″N 2°42′54.12″W
- Completed: 1830s

Design and construction
- Architect: George Vaughan Maddox (reputed)

The Beaufort Arms Hotel, in Agincourt Square in the town of Monmouth, south-east Wales is a former coaching inn dating from the early eighteenth century. The frontage was modified in the 1830s, possibly by the prolific early Victorian architect George Vaughan Maddox. A stone cornice on the central block carries the inscription "The Beaufort Arms". A Grade II* listed building, it features in the Monmouth Heritage Trail. In the 20th century, the building was converted to residential apartments.

== Description ==
The hotel, the "handsomest" in the square, lies to the side of the Shire Hall. It is three and one half storeys high, and five bays across. The rear has an extensive courtyard, with stabling for coach horses. The building was converted into flats and shops in 1989. The interior was subject to major alteration during the conversion and the only historically significant remaining features are the entrance lobby, with Ionic pilasters and the top-lit staircase.

== History ==
The Beaufort Arms was named after the Dukes of Beaufort, the preeminent landowners in the area. According to Charles Heath in 1804, the inn consisted originally of two small tenements, one a butcher's and the other a corn dealer's, and the inn yard was a fives court managed by a Mr Pye. In the early 18th century after Pye's death Mr John Tibbs became the owner and developed the inn with the Beaufort portcullis as the sign. The Beaufort Arms became important after the building of the Shire Hall in 1724. Through the influence of the Duke of Beaufort it acquired, in 1760, a part of that new building which encroached on the inn's fives court. The balcony below, facing Agincourt Square, is reputed to have been used by the Dukes of Beaufort for making speeches during elections.

As an added attraction, Mr Tibbs built a bridge across the River Monnow and laid out pleasure gardens on Vauxhall Fields. The modern bridge accessed from Castle Hill is still known as Tibbs' Bridge. John Wesley visited the gardens in 1784, and wrote of "a gently rising ground on the top of which the gentry of the town frequently spend the evening in dancing. From hence spread various walks, bordered with flowers, one of which leads down to the river".

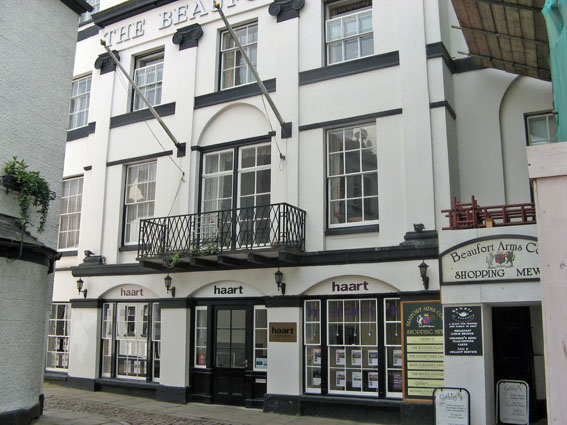

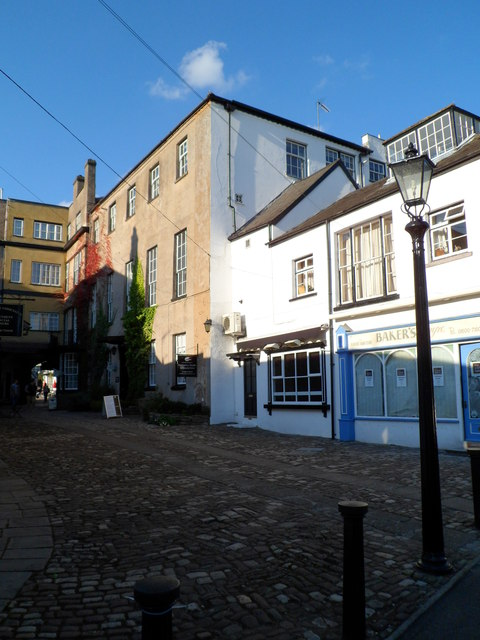
The court behind which now has small shops

Admiral Lord Nelson stayed here in July 1802 with Sir William and Lady Emma Hamilton, arriving by boat on the River Wye. Following his reception in the town, Lord Nelson promised to attend a dinner in his honour on his return journey from Pembrokeshire. On 19 August, at 4pm, at the Beaufort Arms Inn, the company sat down to "a sumptuous entertainment ......for which a fine buck was presented by His Grace the Duke of Beaufort". The inn reached its peak of popularity during the early 19th century when the Wye Tour became fashionable and Nelson's visit had enhanced its status. It became the town's principal coaching inn with direct transport to London by stagecoaches such as 'The Mazeppa' which, in 1830, left the yard at 5am and reached Regent Street at 8pm. The fare was 15 shillings outside the coach and 30 shillings inside.

In more recent times the hotel was one of three hotels in the town owned by the Trust House Organisation. The Rolling Stones stayed here in September 1964 while touring the UK and a letter sent to a fan on headed Beaufort Arms Hotel notepaper written by bassist Bill Wyman, with another sheet of the whole band's signatures, was put up for auction in March 2020. It became privately owned and was then sold to a developer who converted the buildings into apartments and shops in 1989 and renamed the site 'Beaufort Arms Court'. Through the coaching archway on Agincourt Square the inn yard is surrounded by shops and cafes.

Scenes for a 2005 episode of the television series Doctor Who, "The Unquiet Dead", were filmed in the courtyard.
