= Monmouth Regimental Museum =

Military museum in Monmouth, Wales

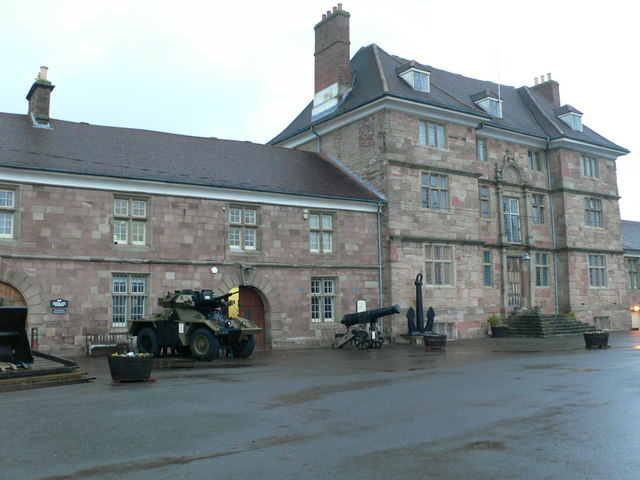
- Monmouth Regimental Museum (left) and Great Castle House (right) on Castle Hill in Monmouth
- Established: 1989
- Location: Monmouth, Monmouthshire, Wales, UK
- Coordinates: 51.812688°N 2.716828°W
- Type: Military
- Website: www.monmouthcastlemuseum.org.uk

The Monmouth Regimental Museum is located on Castle Hill in Monmouth, Monmouthshire, Wales. The museum is in a wing of Great Castle House, a listed building on the Monmouth Heritage Trail. The focus of most of the museum's exhibits is the most senior regiment in the British Territorial Army, the Royal Monmouthshire Royal Engineers. Great Castle House is home to the Royal Monmouthshire Royal Engineers, and the museum maintains the records of the regiment.

== History of the museum ==
Patricia Lynesmith, the museum's curator talks about its history

More formally known as the Castle and Regimental Museum, Monmouth, the Monmouth Regimental Museum (pictured) is located on Castle Hill in Monmouth, Wales, at the highest elevation of the town centre. It is within the 19th-century wing which extends from Great Castle House (pictured), a 17th-century, grade I listed building just northwest of Agincourt Square. Great Castle House is one of 24 blue plaque buildings on the Monmouth Heritage Trail. In 1673, it was constructed from the ruins of Monmouth Castle by the 1st Duke of Beaufort, then the 3rd Marquess of Worcester, as a town house while his other homes were being rebuilt. The three-storey building is currently home to the Royal Monmouthshire Royal Engineers (Militia), the most senior regiment in the British Territorial Army.

Described by BBC Worldwide's Lonely Planet as "a labour of love squeezed into a cupboard-sized space," the Castle and Regimental Museum was established in 1989 by the Duke of Gloucester. It was last accredited in 2010 by the now defunct Museums, Libraries and Archives Council. The museum has been given the Prince of Wales Award for its contribution to Monmouth. The Monmouth Regimental Museum (link to website below) is staffed by volunteers and has free admission. It has been described as one of the "best amenities" in Monmouth.

== History of the Royal Monmouthshire Royal Engineers ==
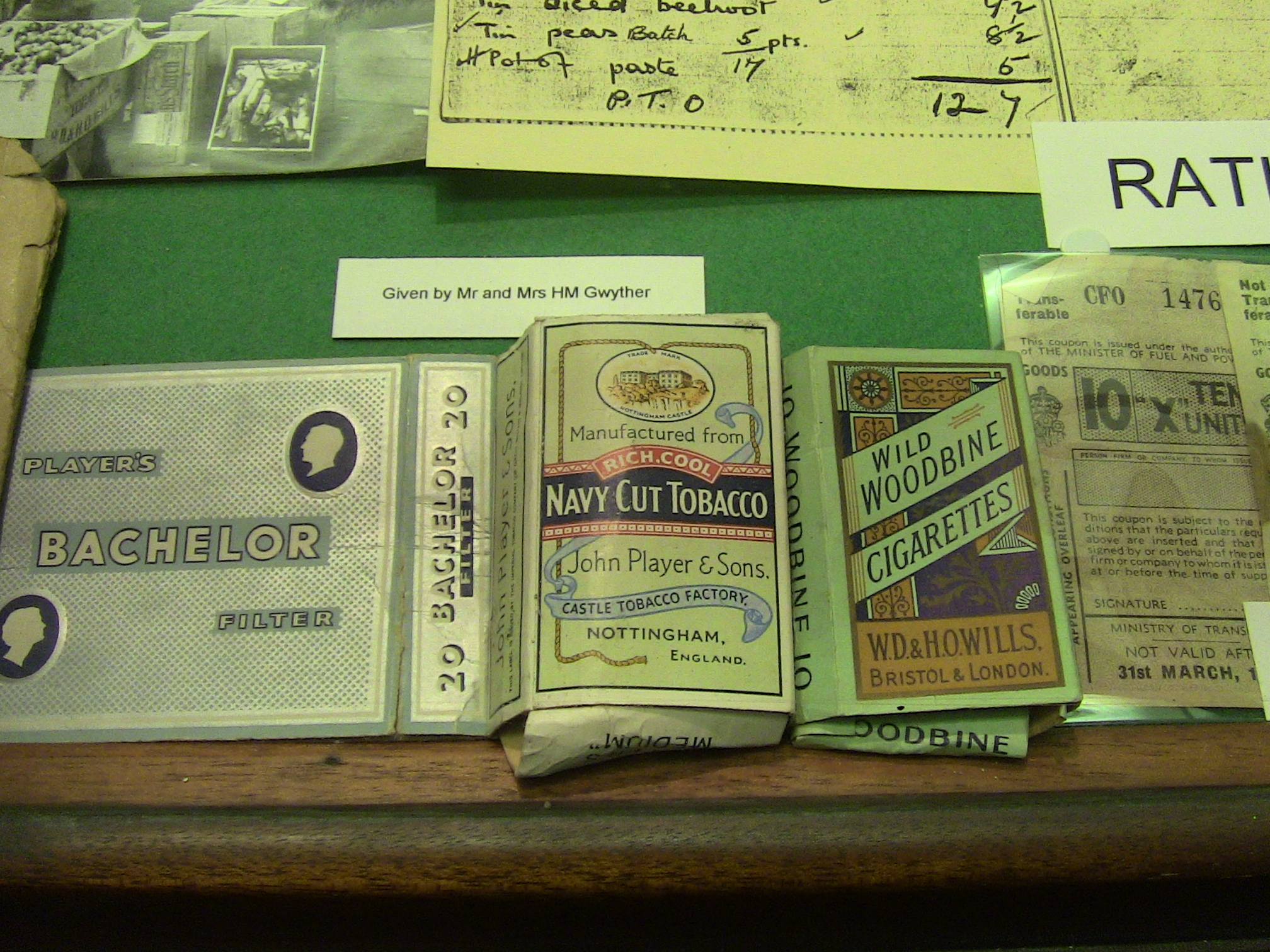
World War II cigarette packages in the Monmouth Regimental Museum

Initially a local militia, the Royal Monmouthshire Royal Engineers is now the British Army's only remaining militia unit and an important component of the Territorial Army reserves. The Territorial Army is made up of volunteers brought together intermittently to be trained and, if necessary, utilized. After its initial muster in 1539, the unit eventually became a posse comitatus. It survived sieges, and was a militia unit for two centuries. From 1877 until 1896, it was an Engineer regiment, after which it was known as a Royal Engineer regiment. In 1896, the Royal Monmouthshire Royal Engineers (link to website below) also gained the distinction of being the sole unit with two "Royals" in its name. In addition, in lieu of a brigade badge or pin, the regiment's soldiers are the only Royal Engineers to wear "the Prince of Wales Division cap badge and militia flash". In December 2010, the BBC News reported that the Royal Monmouthshire Royal Engineers were with the 21st Engineer Regiment during the most recent deployment. Members of the regiment had served in Operation Herrick in the Helmand Province. After their return from Afghanistan, the soldiers were honoured with a parade through Monmouth, a salute near Shire Hall, and a church service, later receiving their service medals.

== Exhibits ==
The displays at the museum cover a number of subjects, including the Militia structure and the Dukes of Beaufort. Other topics specific to the Royal Monmouthshire Royal Engineers include the double "Royal" name, the colours the unit possesses, and the Freedoms. Objects include a regimental drum from the late 19th century, a water testing kit, and a canned cake ration from World War II. The museum's exhibits also cover the regiment's distinction as the oldest regiment of the Reserve Army. Other topics include the mediaeval walls and defences of Monmouth, with archaeological displays. One mediaeval artefact displayed in the museum is a fireless cooking pot that was discovered on Castle Hill (link to the archaeological find below). The cooking vessel appears to have been the mediaeval version of a crock pot.

Exhibits are as diverse as a colonel's uniform and World War II cigarette packages (both pictured above), and an infant gas mask (pictured below). Wales during war, HMS Monmouth, and the role of the Royal Monmouthshire Royal Engineers in recent wars are also covered. In front of the building, the museum displays a number of larger pieces of military equipment, including a British armoured fighting vehicle (pictured above). In addition, the War Memorial of the Royal Monmouthshire Royal Engineers (pictured), grade II listed, is located on Castle Hill, near the museum.

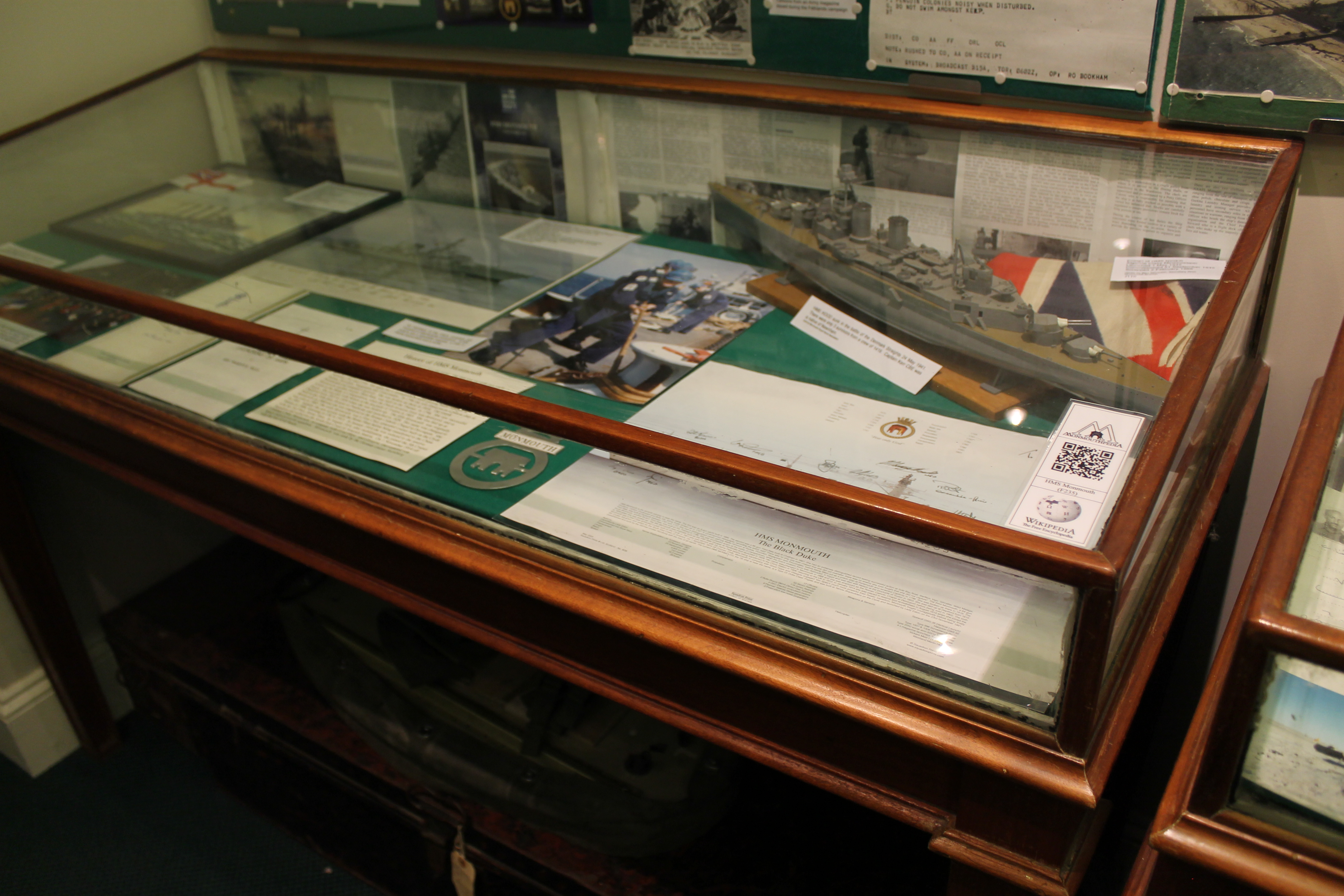
A display cabinet at the museum

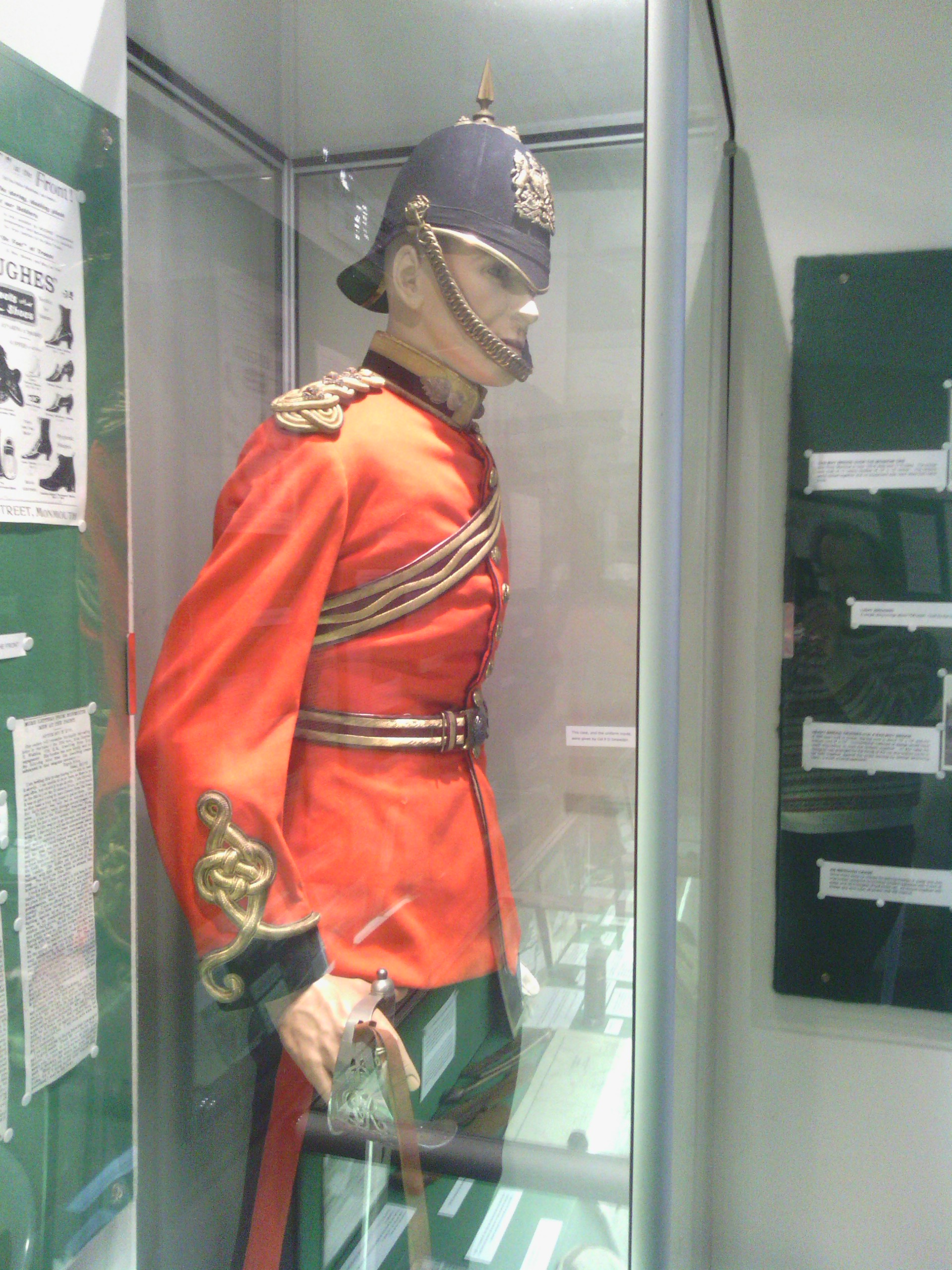
Colonel's uniform, militia, at the museum

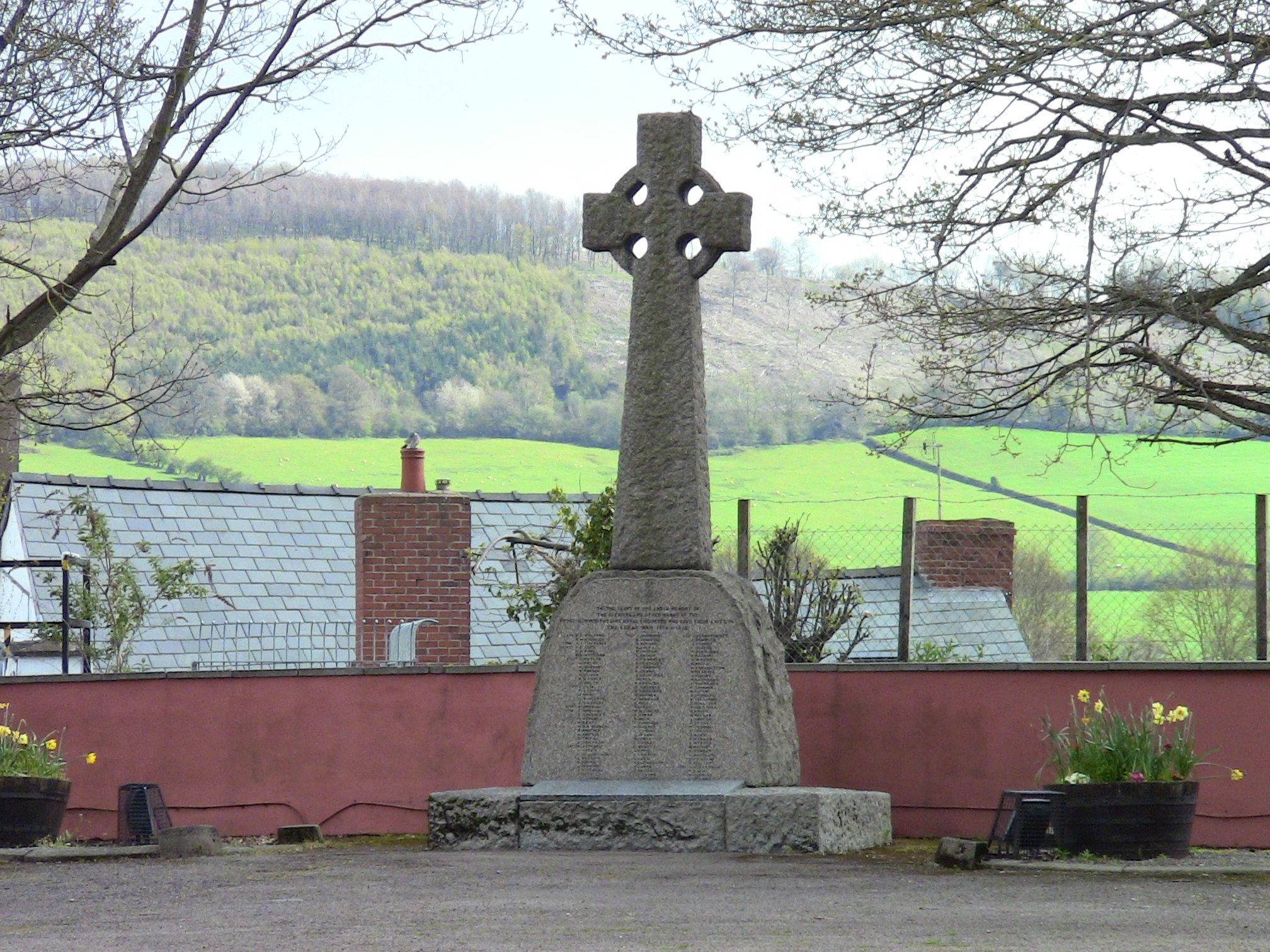
War Memorial of the Royal Monmouthshire Royal Engineers

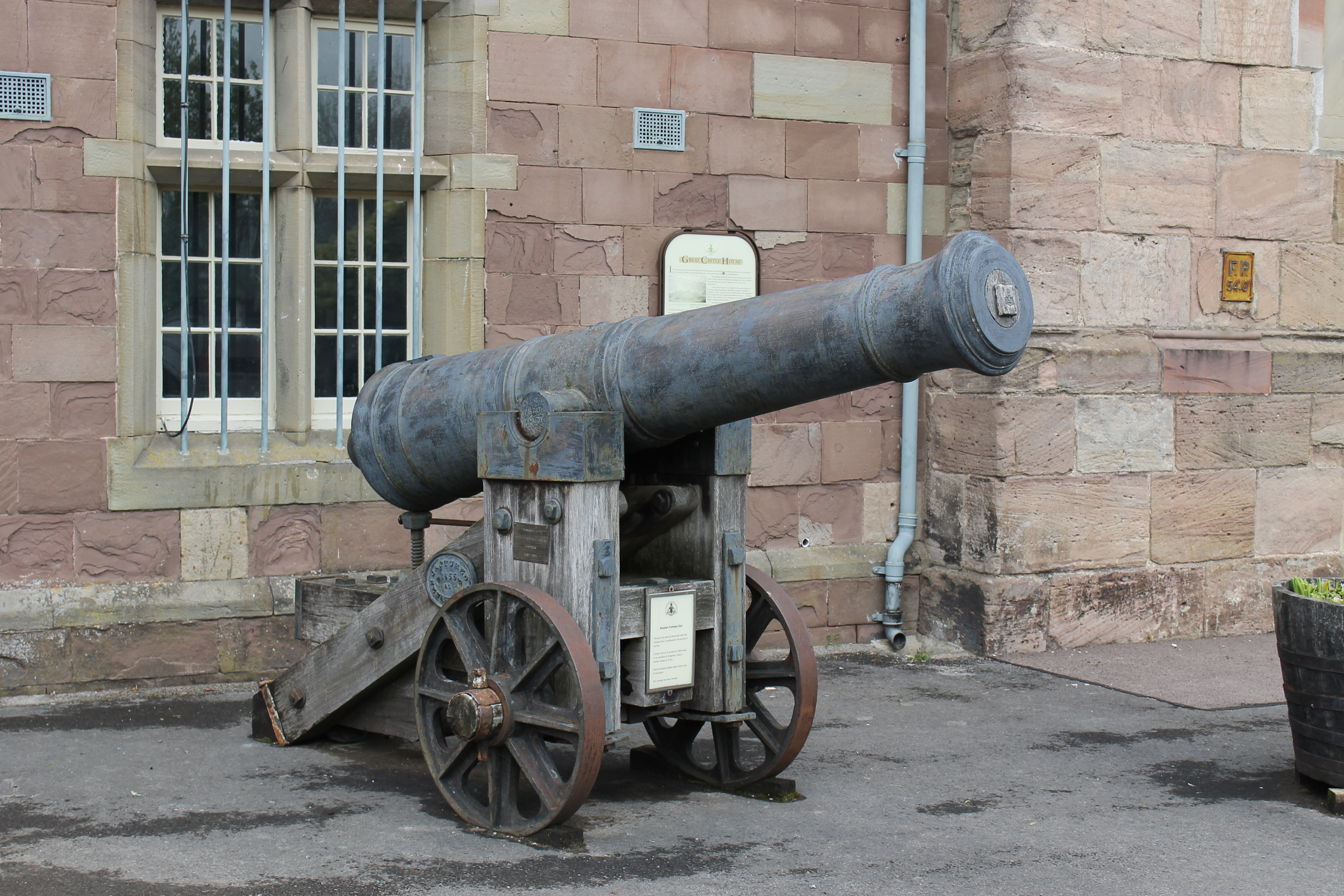
Siege gun

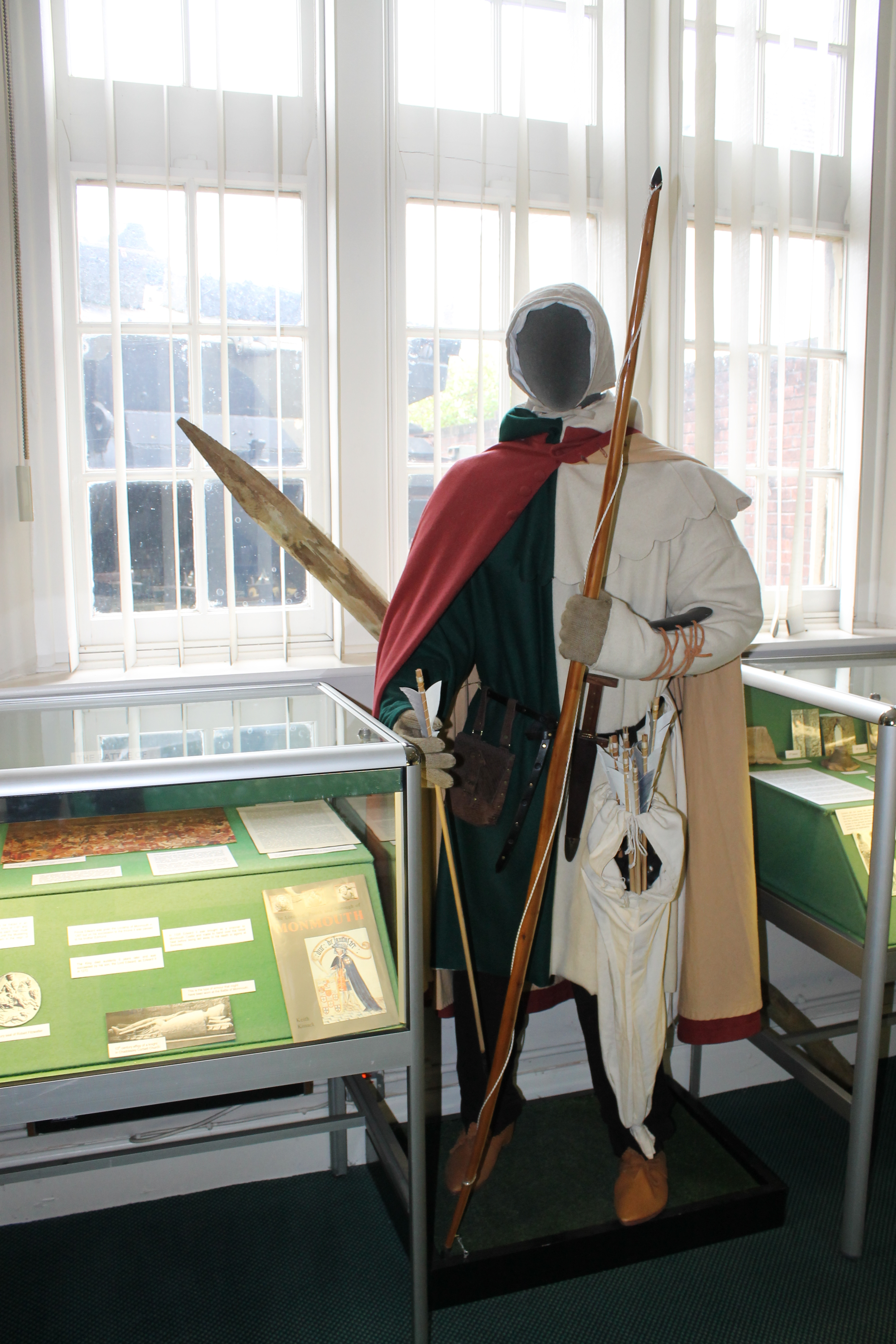
Militia mannequin

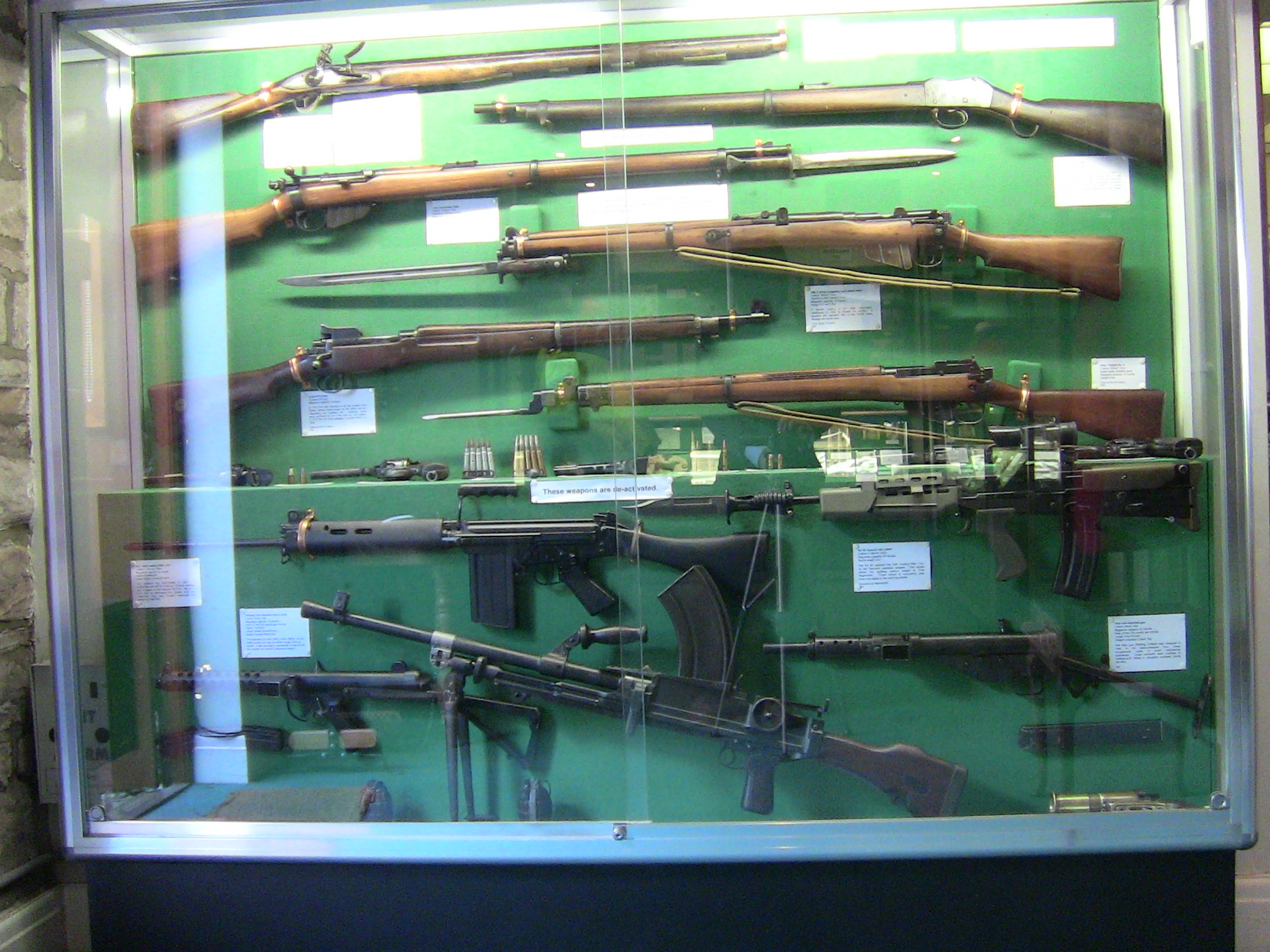
collection of deactivated firearms

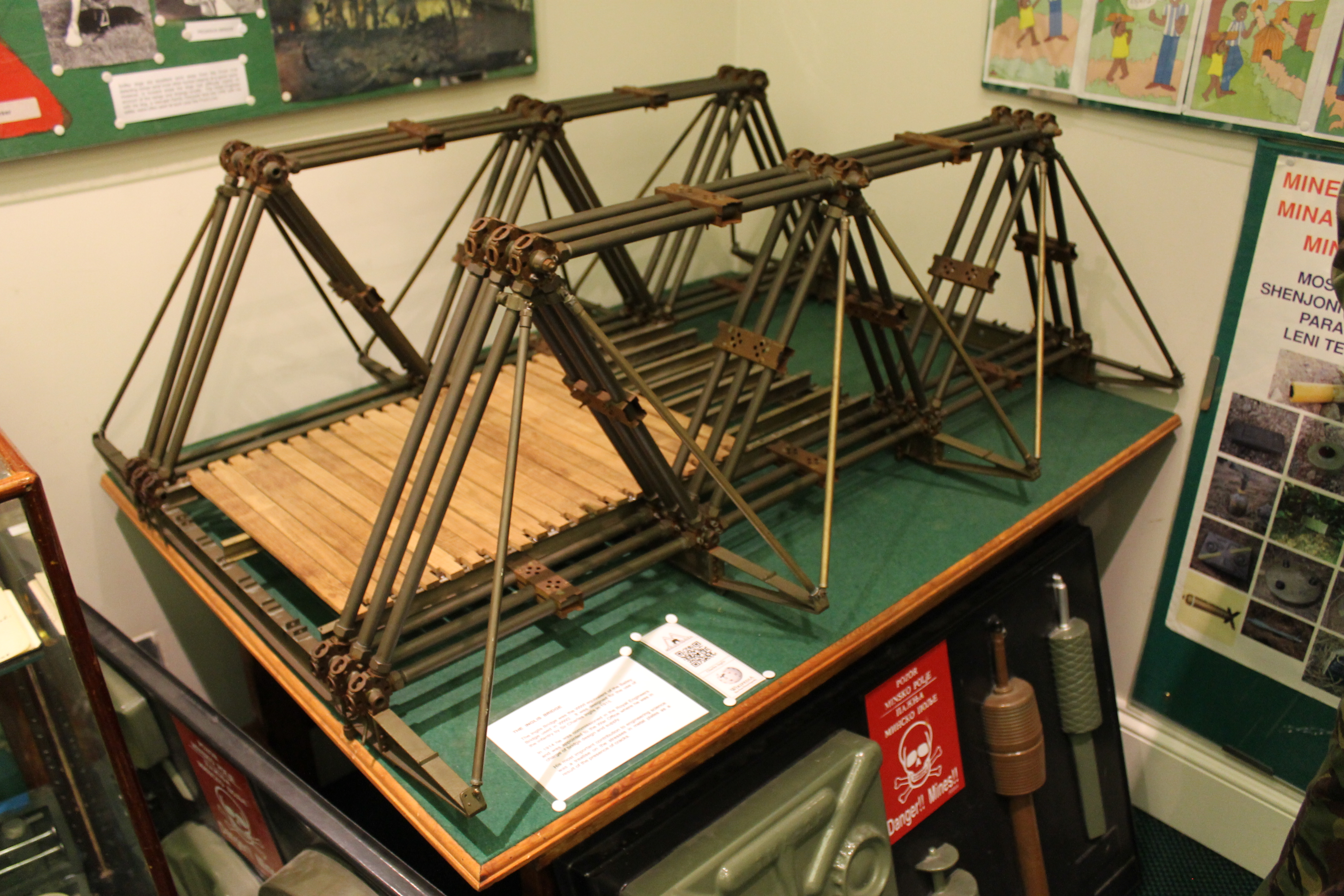
model of an Inglis bridge

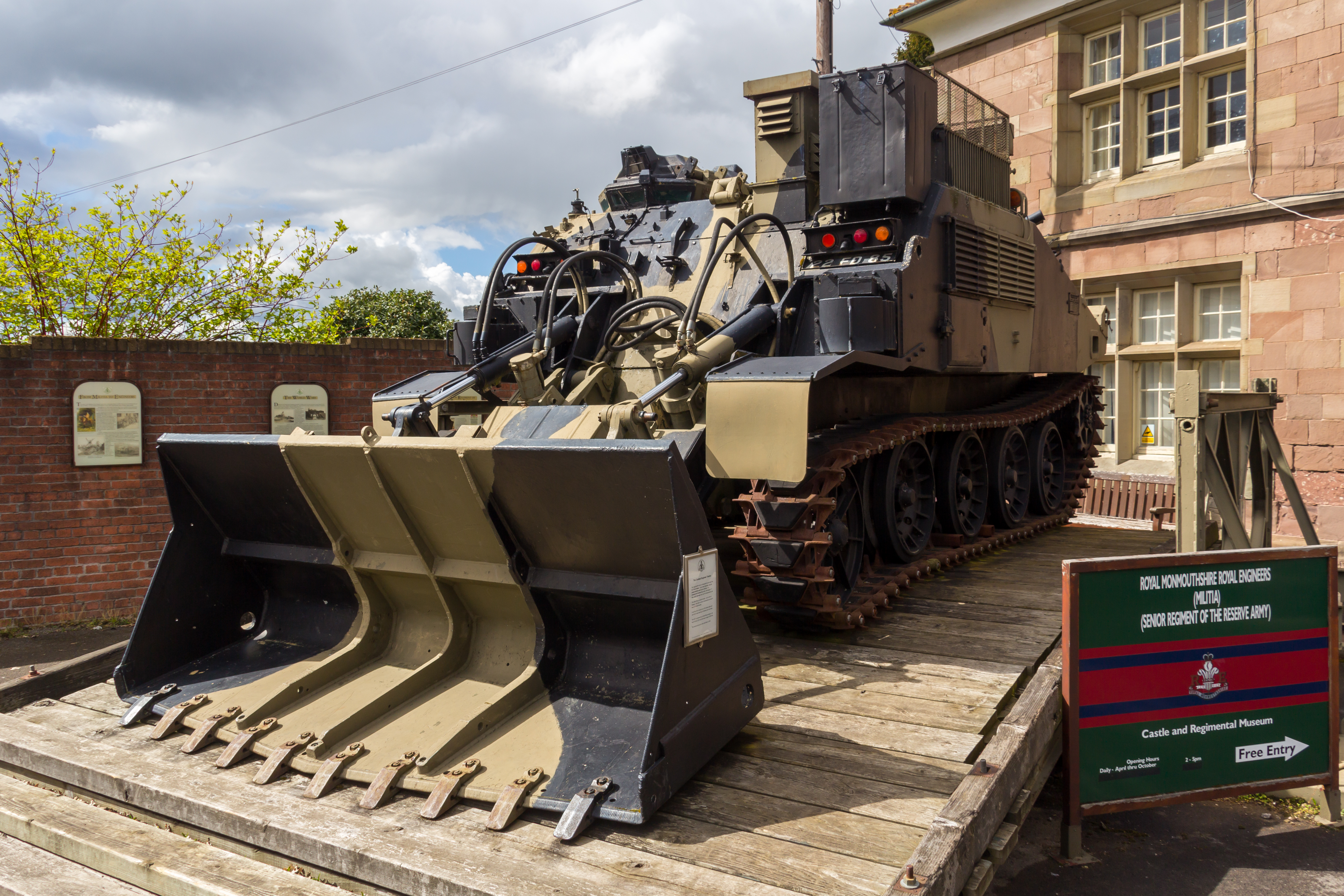
military bulldozer

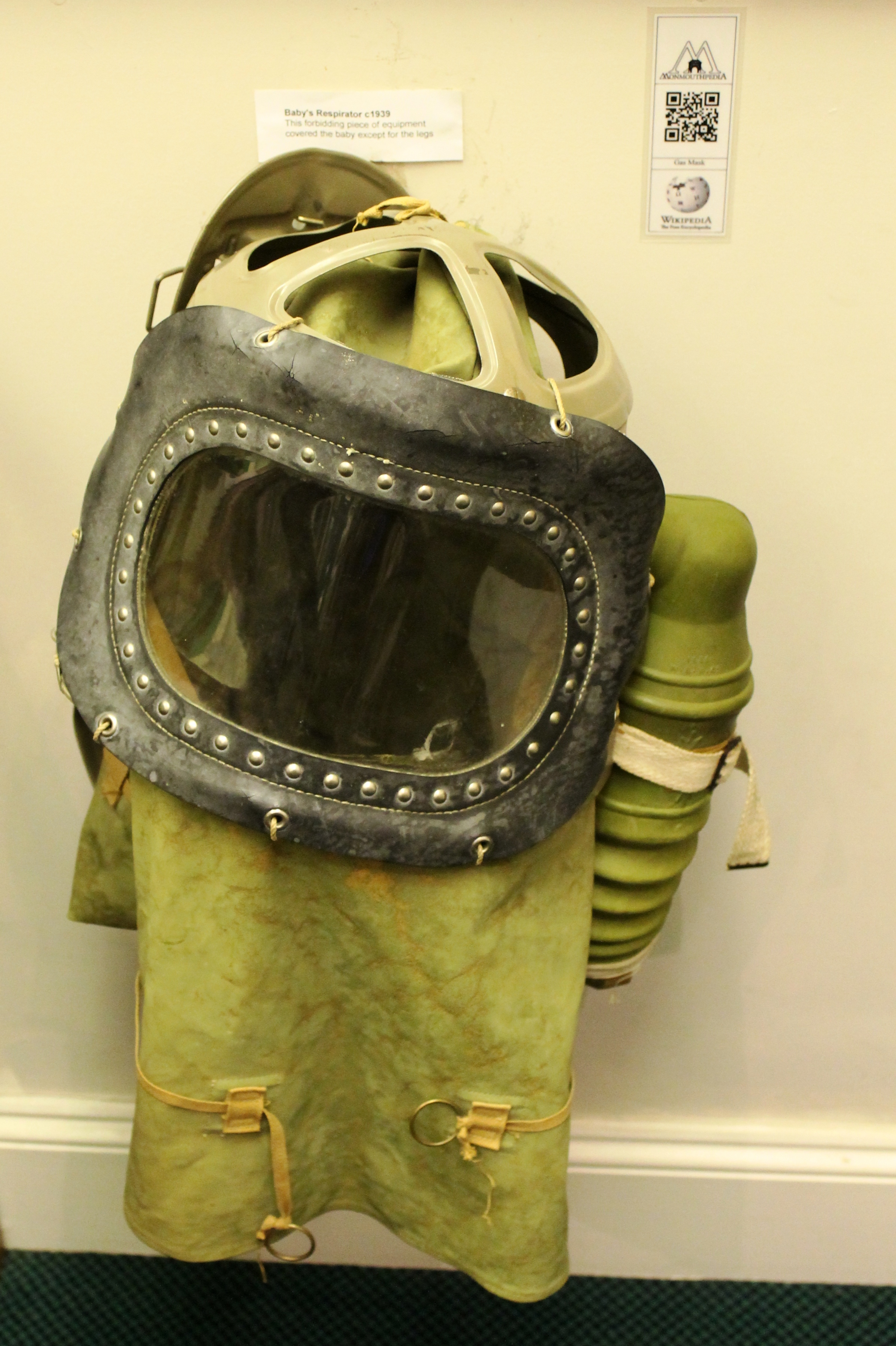
World War II gas mask for an infant, at the regimental museum

== Archives ==
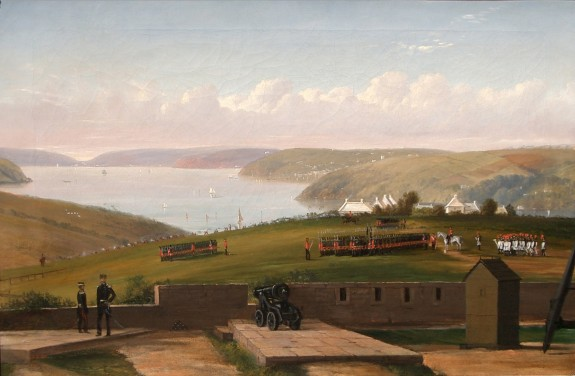
The Royal Monmouthshire (Light Infantry) Militia at Pembroke Dock in 1855

In addition to providing displays of historical objects, the Monmouth Regimental Museum serves as a repository for the records of the Royal Monmouthshire Royal Engineers. The documents relate to the period from 1786 to 1991. The archives reveal how the title of the regiment has evolved over the centuries. Between 1660 and 1793, it was known as the "Monmouthshire Militia." After that, it was briefly (until 1804) known as the "Monmouth and Brecon Militia." The unit first adopted the royal name in 1804, when it was the "Royal Monmouth and Brecon Militia." In 1820, it altered its name to the "Royal Monmouthshire Militia." Between 1852 and 1877, the regiment was entitled the "Royal Monmouthshire (Light Infantry) Militia" (pictured). Then the unit changed from an infantry role to that of engineer and became a Reserve Engineer Regiment as the "Royal Monmouthshire Engineers (Militia)." In 1896, when it became a Royal Engineer unit, the regiment was finally entitled the "Royal Monmouthshire Royal Engineers (Militia)." The museum's archive includes the unit's rolls and enlistment records. Some of the records are available as a searchable database on the internet. Evaluation of the records reveals that the men of the regiment were not just from the Monmouthshire area. By World War I, the unit attracted recruits from all areas of England and Wales. The museum and its archive are listed with the United Kingdom National Inventory of War Memorials (UKNIWM), which has created a database of United Kingdom war memorials. The goal of the organisation is to facilitate the "appreciation, use and preservation" of the monuments.
