= Monmouth (disambiguation) =

Monmouth is a town in Wales.

Monmouth may also refer to:

== Places ==
=== Australia ===
- Monmouth Land District, Tasmania
- Electoral district of Monmouth, Tasmania
- Electoral division of Monmouth, Tasmania

=== Canada ===
- Monmouth Mountain, in British Columbia

=== United Kingdom ===
- Monmouth (Senedd constituency)
- Monmouth (UK Parliament constituency)

=== United States ===
- Monmouth (Natchez, Mississippi), a historic home
- Monmouth, California
- Monmouth, Illinois
- Monmouth, Indiana
- Monmouth, Iowa
- Monmouth, Kansas
- Monmouth, Maine
- Monmouth, Oregon
- Monmouth Beach, New Jersey
- Monmouth County, New Jersey
- Monmouth Township (disambiguation)
- Fort Monmouth, a former United States Army post commemorating the 1778 battle

== People ==
- Geoffrey of Monmouth (c. 1095 – c. 1155), wrote Historia Regum Britanniae (History of the Kings of Britain)
- Thomas of Monmouth, 12th-century Benedictine monk
- James Scott, 1st Duke of Monmouth (1649–1685), illegitimate son of Charles II
- Earl of Monmouth, a title created twice in the Peerage of England

== Schools ==
- Monmouth Academy (Maine), U.S.
- Monmouth Academy (New Jersey), U.S.
- Monmouth College, in Monmouth, Illinois, U.S.
- Monmouth School for Boys, Wales
- Monmouth University, formerly Monmouth College, in New Jersey, U.S.

== Other uses ==
- HMS Monmouth, the name of several military ships
- Monmouth, British merchant ship

== See also ==
- Monmouthshire (disambiguation)
- Monmouth Rebellion, 1685, an attempt to overthrow James II
- Battle of Monmouth, 1778, in the American Revolutionary War
- Battle of Monmouth (1233), Wales
- Monmouth Street
