= War Memorial of the Royal Monmouthshire Royal Engineers =

Cemetery in Monmouthshire, Wales

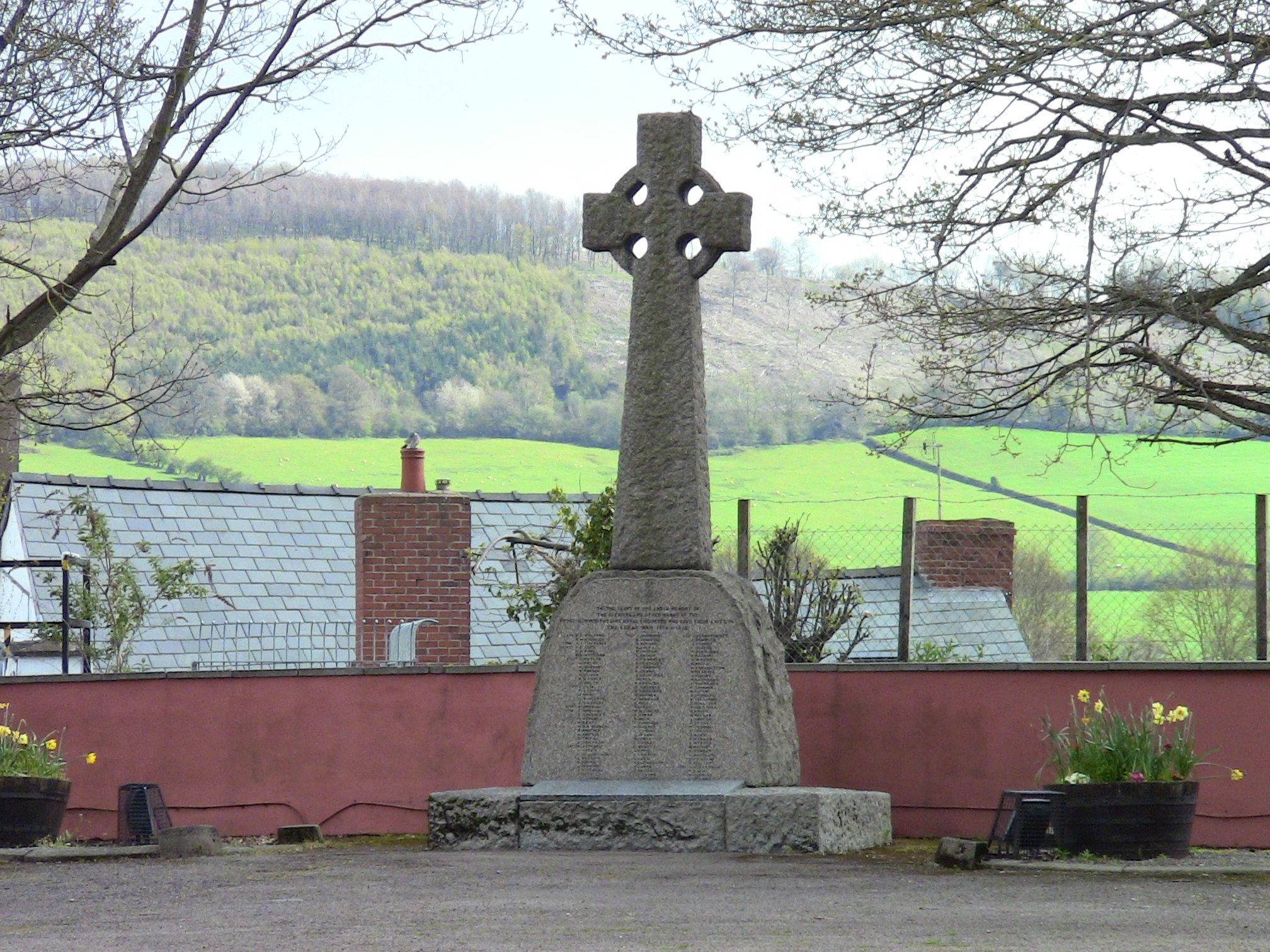
- War Memorial of the Royal Monmouthshire Royal Engineers in Monmouth
- Interactive map of War Memorial of the Royal Monmouthshire Royal Engineers

Details
- Location: Monmouth, Monmouthshire
- Country: Wales
- Coordinates: 51.8121°N 2.7165°W
- Type: military

The War Memorial of the Royal Monmouthshire Royal Engineers commemorates the soldiers who died in World War I and World War II.

== Location ==
The War Memorial of the Royal Monmouthshire Royal Engineers is located in Monmouth, Monmouthshire, Wales. It is on the grounds of Castle Hill, the site of the ruins of Monmouth Castle, the birthplace of Henry V. Castle Hill is also the location of Great Castle House, the headquarters for the Royal Monmouthshire Royal Engineers (Militia). Great Castle House is home to the Castle and Regimental Museum as well. Castle Hill is not far from the Monmouth War Memorial at St. James' Square.

== Description ==
The monument includes a two-part base upon which is a memorial cross. The design is that of a Celtic cross. The names of the dead are inscribed on the base.

The memorial is dedicated:

To the glory of God and in memory of
the officers and other ranks of the
Royal Monmouthshire Royal Engineers who gave their lives in
the Great War 1914–1918.

Underneath are the names of 100 soldiers of the RMRE who died in the Great War. A marble slab at the base commemorates those who died in the Second World War.

== Listing ==
The war memorial is a listed building. It is on the Statutory List of Buildings of Special Architectural or Historic Interest in the United Kingdom. It was listed as a Grade II structure on 8 October 2005. Such structures are considered to be "nationally important and of special interest." Ninety-two percent of listed buildings are of this grade. In addition, the Cadw Building ID Number of the war memorial is 85238. Cadw is the historic environment service for the government of Wales. The Welsh term "cadw" means to keep or protect.

== See also ==
- World War I memorials
