= Great Castle House =

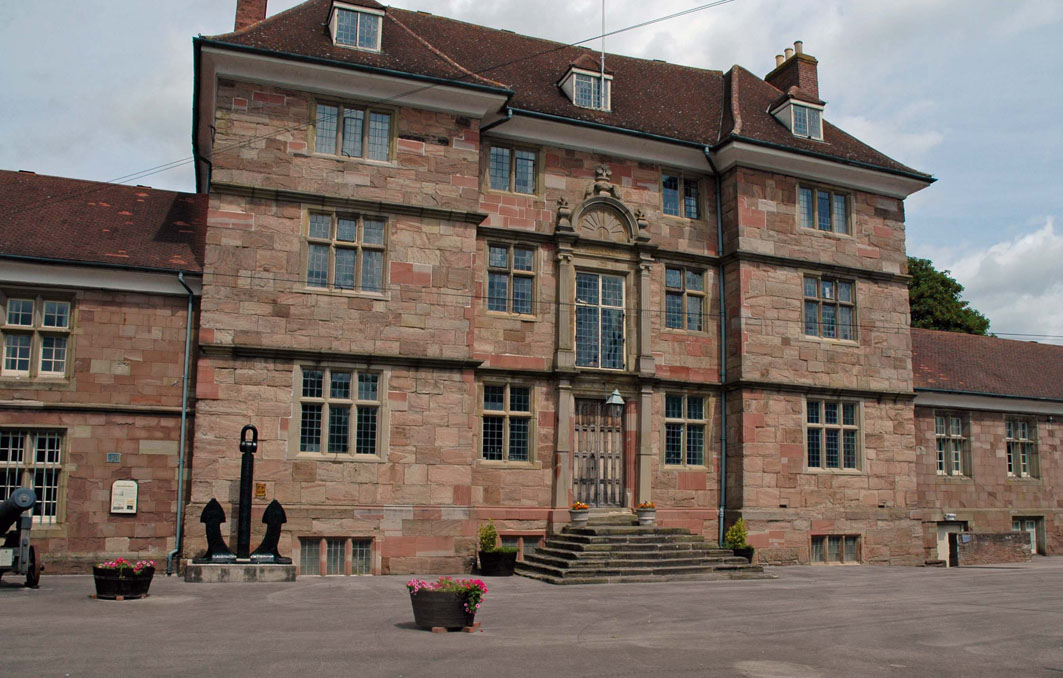
- Great Castle House
- Interactive map of the Great Castle House area

General information
- Location: Castle Hill, Monmouth, Wales
- Coordinates: 51.8127°N 2.7164°W
- Current tenants: Royal Monmouthshire Royal Engineers and Regimental Museum
- Completed: 1673
- Client: Henry Somerset, the 3rd Marquis of Worcester

Design and construction
- Designations: Grade I listed

Great Castle House is a former town house built on the site of part of Monmouth Castle in Wales. Amongst the town's most significant buildings, it has a Grade I listing and is one of 24 sites on the Monmouth Heritage Trail. The house is located on Castle Hill, off Agincourt Square in Monmouth town centre.

Described as "a house of splendid swagger outside and in", it was completed in 1673 for Henry Somerset, the 3rd Marquis of Worcester, who was Lord President of the Council of Wales and the Marches. It later became an Assize Court, until the Court moved to the new Shire Hall in 1725. It has been the Headquarters of Royal Monmouthshire Royal Engineers (Militia) since the mid-19th century, and contains the Regimental Museum.

== History and architecture ==
When Worcester was appointed to the post of President of the Council of Wales and the Marches, he decided that he needed a seat in the Marches appropriate to his status. The house was primarily intended to be used for ceremonial and official, rather than domestic, purposes. The architect is unknown. The house was built of mottled pink and grey blocks of Old Red Sandstone, probably mostly reused from the gatehouse and Great Tower of the castle, which were wholly or partly demolished after the Civil War; much has been renewed more recently. The remains of the castle stand in the far left-hand side of the courtyard in front of the house.

The facade of the house is severely symmetrical with an elegant and decorative doorway. The two side wings are 19th-century additions to a building that originally stood alone. The interior is described as "astonishing", particularly for its plasterwork. On the first floor there is a large room with extravagantly decorated ceilings; this was originally five rooms, later combined as the main courtroom. The plasterwork was mostly made by travelling craftsmen using established patterns, but has been lavishly and ostentatiously fashioned with pendant floral festoons laced with ribbons in what were originally the Marquis's private rooms.

Shortly after building Great Castle House, Worcester was created Duke of Beaufort, and needed still larger houses, first at Troy House and then at Badminton House, leaving Great Castle House to be repanelled for the Assizes. When the Assizes moved to Shire Hall in 1725, the house became lodgings for the judges (though part of it was let to a maker of drainage pipes), but later they moved to less spacious lodgings in the town, and from about 1760 the house provided a high-class school for young ladies.

== Castle and Regimental Museum ==
In 1853, it became the headquarters of the Militia Regiment, later the Royal Monmouthshire Royal Engineers, the Senior Regiment of the Reserve Army. Most of the building remains as the regiment's headquarters, but part now houses the Castle and Regimental Museum, established in 1989, which is open in the afternoon in summer. The Museum opens onto the King's Garden, containing plants known to have been growing at the time of Henry V (1386–1422), who was born in the castle. The museum displays include regimental artefacts and regalia, the importance of the Dukes of Beaufort, the earlier defences of Monmouth and its castle, HMS Monmouth, and the military activities of the regiment from its founding to the present.

== Gallery ==
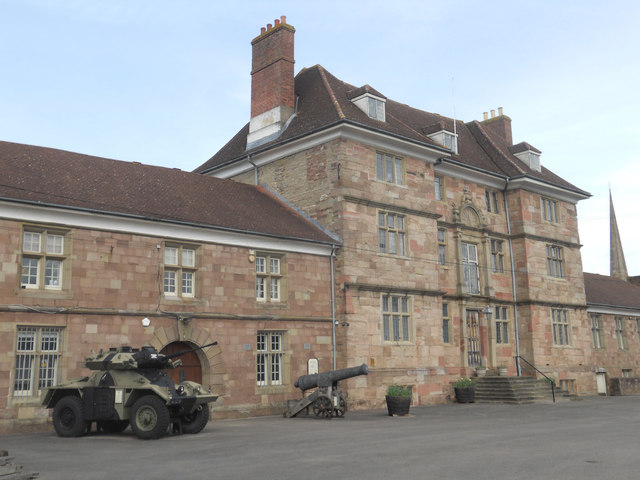
Great Castle House

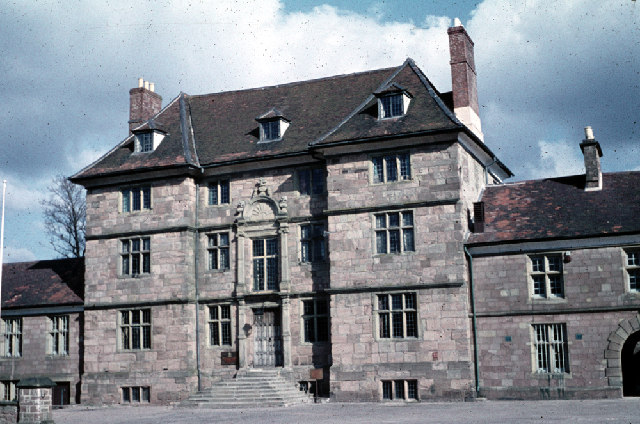
Great Castle House in 1959

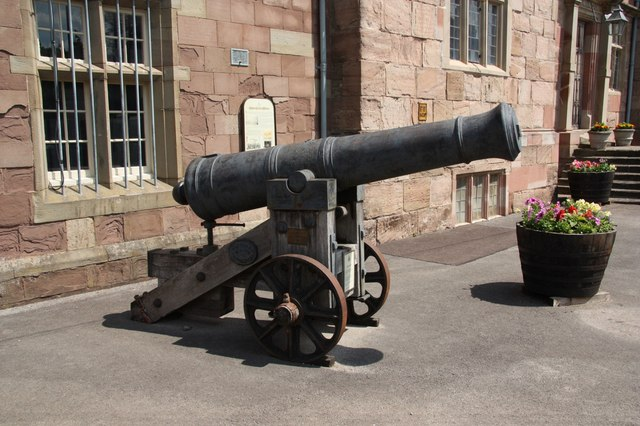
Russian Fortress Gun outside the museum

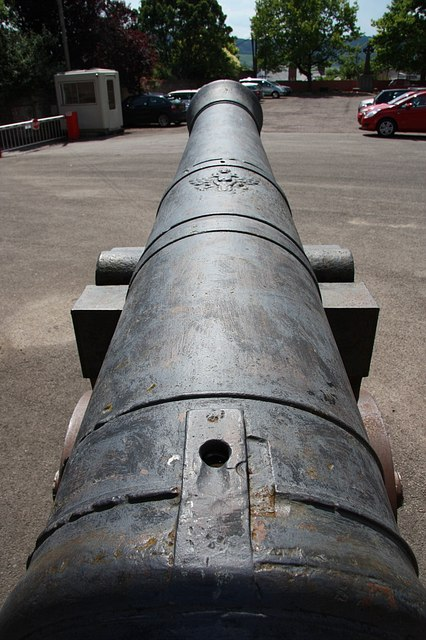
Looking along the barrel of the Russian Fortress Gun

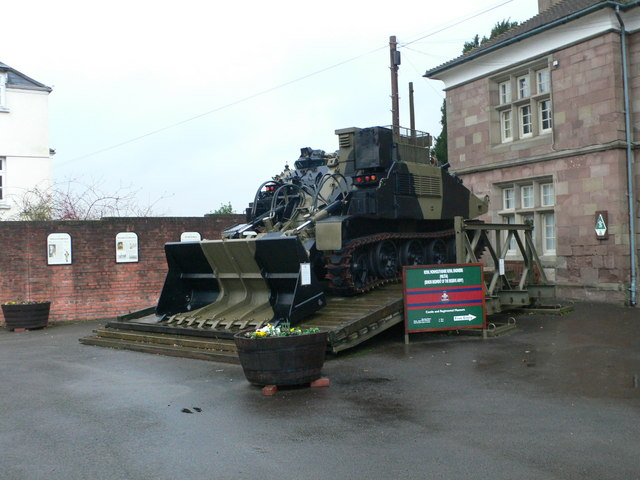
Military Bulldozer
