= Monmouth Township =

Monmouth Township may refer to:

- Monmouth Township, Warren County, Illinois
- Monmouth Township, Jackson County, Iowa
- Monmouth Township, Shawnee County, Kansas
