= Monmouthshire (disambiguation) =

Monmouthshire is a local government principal area in Wales.

Monmouthshire can also refer to:

- Monmouthshire (historic), the historic county covering a wider area
- Monmouthshire County Council, the local authority that since 1996 administers the principal area and previously the administrative county (1889–1974)
- Monmouthshire (UK Parliament constituency), a parliamentary constituency based on the historic county (1536–1885) and re-created in 2024
