= Monmouth Castle =

Castle in Monmouth, Wales

- Welsh: Castell Trefynwy
- Monmouth in Wales, United Kingdom
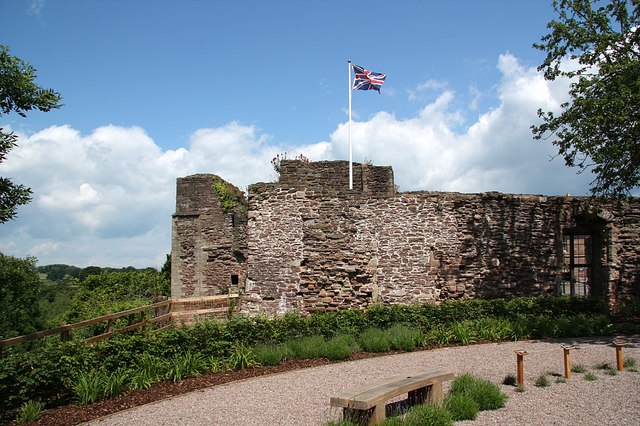
- Ruins of the castle

Site information
- Type: Fortified castle
- Owner: British Army
- Operator: British Army Reserve
- Controlled by: Royal Monmouthshire Royal Engineers
- Open to the public: Yes
- Condition: Ruin
- Website: Official website

Location
- Location within Monmouthshire Location within Wales Location within the United Kingdom
- Coordinates: 51.8125°N 2.7167°W
- Grid reference: SO506128

Site history
- Built: 1067; 959 years ago
- Built by: William FitzOsbern, 1st Earl of Hereford
- Fate: Slighted (ordered demolished)
- Demolished: 30 March 1647
- Events: English Civil War

Garrison information
- Designations

Listed Building – Grade I
- Official name: Monmouth Castle
- Type: Defence
- Designated: 15 August 1974
- Reference no.: 2216
- Designation information via Cadw

Monmouth Castle (Welsh: Castell Trefynwy) is a castle close to the centre of the town of Monmouth, the county town of Monmouthshire, on a hill above the River Monnow in south-east Wales.

Once an important border castle, and birthplace of Henry V of England, it stood until the English Civil War when it was damaged and changed hands three times before being slighted to prevent it being fortified again. After partial collapse in 1647, the site was reused and built over by Great Castle House, which became the headquarters and regimental museum of the Royal Monmouthshire Royal Engineers.

It is a Grade I listed building and scheduled monument.

== Early Norman border castle ==
Immediately after the Norman Conquest, William the Conqueror installed three of his most trusted confidants, Hugh d'Avranches, Earl of Chester, Roger of Montgomery, and William FitzOsbern, as the Earls of Chester, Shrewsbury and Hereford respectively. The earldoms served to guard the frontier and provided bases for the Norman invasion of Wales. Over the next four centuries, Norman lords established mostly small Marcher Lordships between the Dee and Severn, and further west. Military adventurers came to Wales from Normandy and elsewhere, raided an area of Wales, and then fortified it and granted land to some of their supporters.

William FitzOsbern established Monmouth Castle between 1066 and 1069 as a counterpart to his other major castle at Chepstow. It occupied relatively high ground, overlooking the confluence of the Monnow with the River Wye. It was originally an earth and timber ringwork fortress, which was listed in the Domesday Book of 1086. Initially, Monmouth was a fairly typical border castle in the Welsh Marches, presided over by a Marcher Lord and similar in style and status to its near neighbours Grosmont Castle, Skenfrith Castle, White Castle and Abergavenny Castle. The wooden castle had stonework added before 1150. Its tower shares some similarities with that of Chepstow Castle, another stronghold built for FitzOsbern further south, at the lower end of the River Wye.

== Expansion and later use ==
After briefly being held by Simon de Montfort, 6th Earl of Leicester, Monmouth Castle passed into the hands of Edmund Crouchback, Earl of Lancaster and son of Henry III in 1267. He redeveloped the castle, building the Hall and took it as his main residence in the area. It was further improved in the early 14th century, probably by Crouchback's grandson, Henry of Grosmont, 1st Duke of Lancaster. During this period large decorated windows were installed in the upper part of the Great Tower which also had a new roof. As a town developed around the castle, the castle's defences were augmented by a town wall and fortified bridge, built at the end of the 13th century.

Edward II briefly was held prisoner in the castle before he was transferred to Berkeley Castle where he died. The castle was a favourite residence of Henry Bolingbroke, later King as Henry IV. It was here that in 1386 the future King Henry V of England was born, to Bolingbroke's first wife Mary de Bohun.

The turmoil and conflict in Wales during the ten years of the Owain Glyndŵr rebellion did not directly affect Monmouth Castle as it was a stronghold of the region and lesser targets presented themselves more readily to essentially a guerilla army. However other local towns, settlements and castles were directly attacked with Grosmont and Abergavenny being razed and Crickhowell Castle and Newport Castle successfully attacked.

Over the centuries, as its defensive function diminished, the outer bailey of the castle became increasingly used as a market place, later (and now) known as Agincourt Square. During the sixteenth century, when Monmouth became the county town of the newly formed shire of Monmouth, the county's Courts of Assize began to be held in the castle's Great Hall.

== Civil War ==
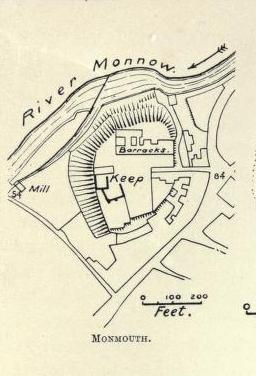
Plan of the castle, published in 1904

In the tumult of the English Civil War, Monmouth Castle changed hands three times, finally falling to the Parliamentarians in 1645. Oliver Cromwell visited Monmouth in 1646, and according to tradition ordered the slighting (demolition) of the castle. On 1 March 1647, the House of Commons resolved "That the Town and Castle of Monmouth be disgarisoned, and the Works slighted". The demolition process began with the round tower on 30 March 1647. The events were recorded in the diary, now lost, of More Pye, then usher at Monmouth School. The demolition took months, and Pye's diary also recorded the collapse on 22 December 1647; "about twelve o'clock, the Tower in the Castle of Monmouth fell down, upon one side, whilst we were at sermon". William Gilpin, visiting Monmouth on his Wye Tour, described the castle's decline by the end of the 18th century; "The transmutations of time are often ludicrous... formerly the palace of a king, and birth-place of a mighty prince: it is now converted into a yard for fatting ducks".

Great Castle House was built in 1673, on the site of the old round tower, by Henry Somerset, 1st Duke of Beaufort. It is a Grade I listed building, and has been described as "a house of splendid swagger outside and in". It later became used for the Assize Courts, until they relocated to the new Shire Hall in 1725.

== Modern history ==
Only fragments of the castle, including the Great Tower and Hall and parts of the walls, remain above ground, and on the site Castle House and Great House have been built. In 1875, the Royal Monmouthshire Royal Engineers Militia, the senior Army Reserve regiment today, made it their Headquarters building and so it remains. It is one of the few British castles in continuous military occupancy. The Royal Monmouthshire Royal Engineers museum is located in the stable block attached to Great Castle House. It includes exhibits relating to the history of the regiment from 1539 to the present day.

The castle is a Grade I listed building and a scheduled monument in the care of Cadw.

== Gallery ==
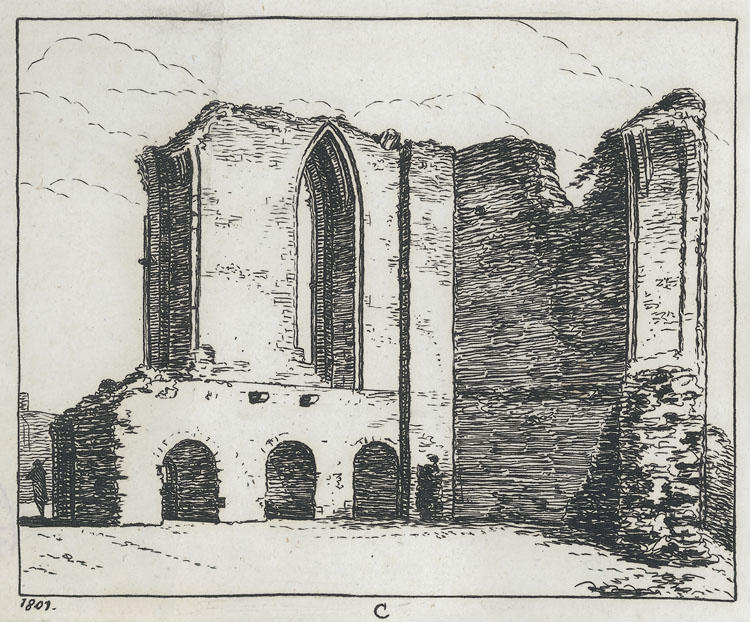
Architectural drawing of Monmouth Castle, black and white print, from engraving, 1801

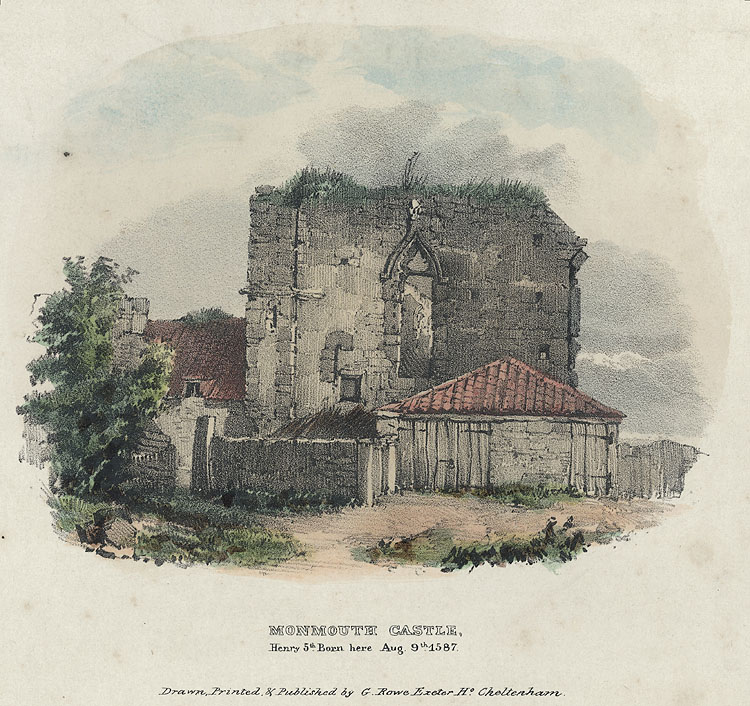
Early lithograph by George Rowe

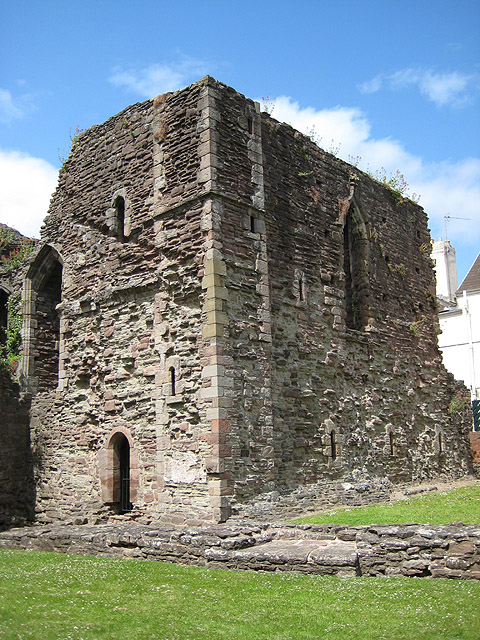
Ruins of the Great Tower

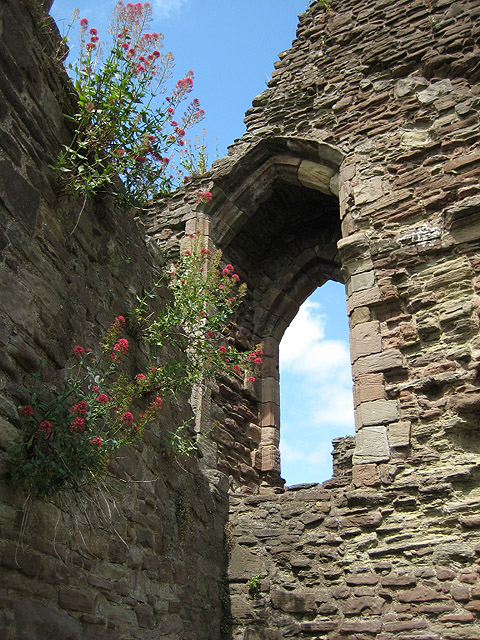
Medieval window in the ruins of the Great Tower

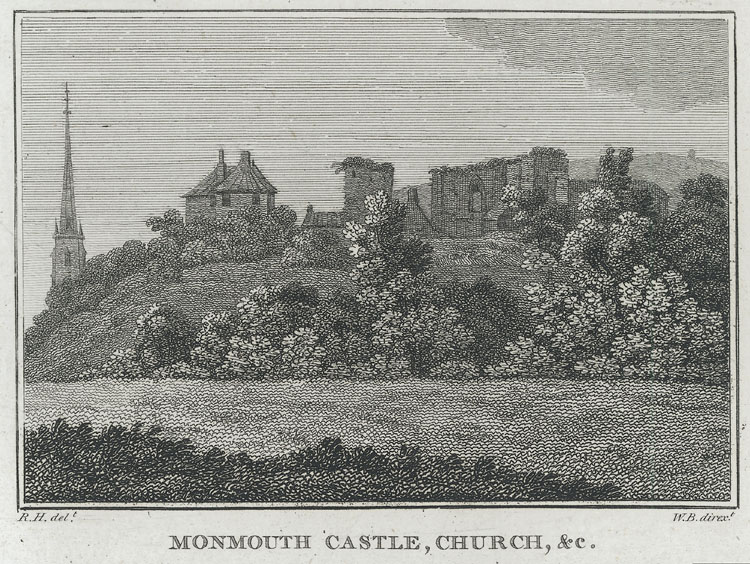
Monmouth Castle and St Mary's Priory Church, black and white print on engraving, 1800

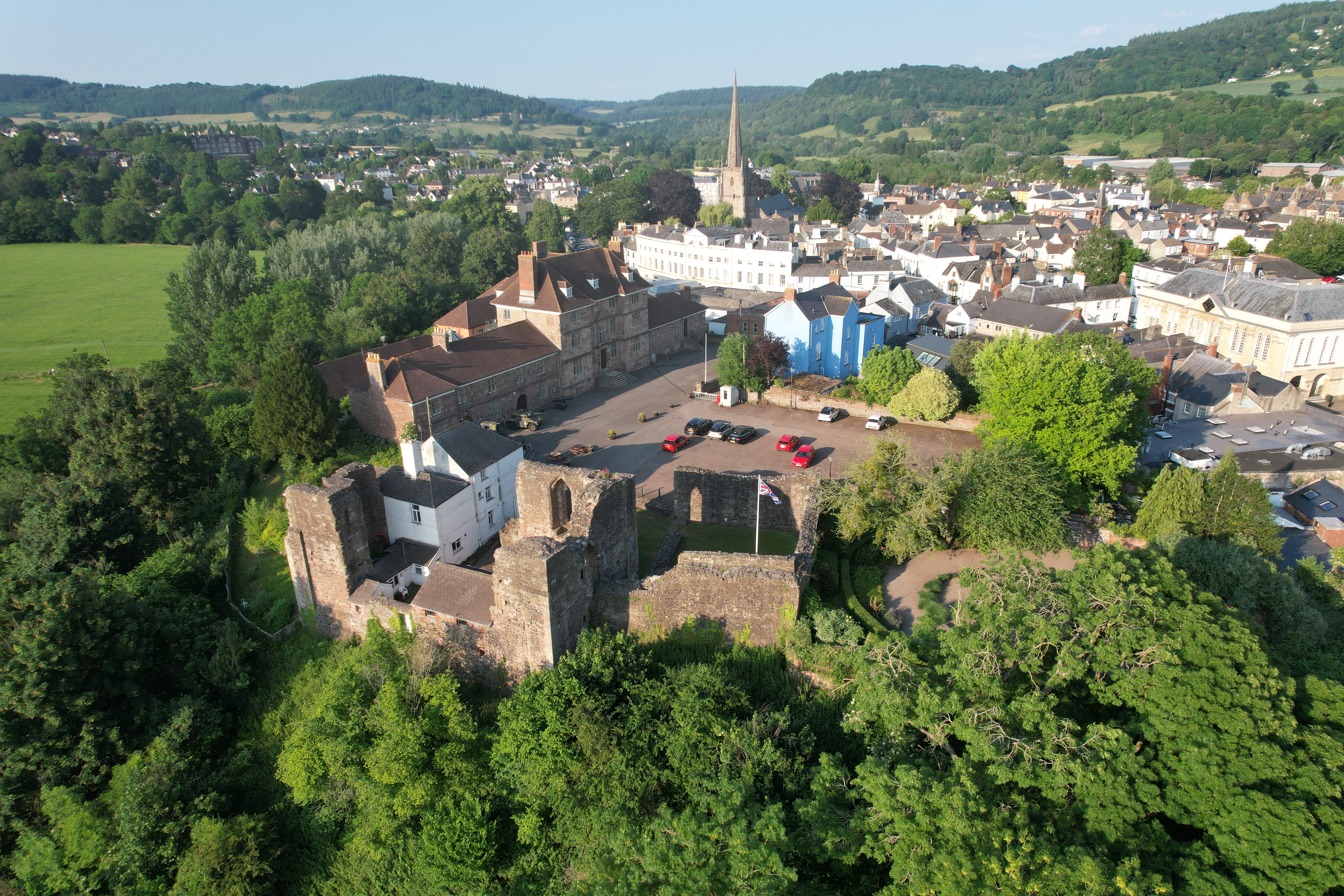
Aerial photo of Monmouth Castle and surrounding areas from the west.

== Sources ==
- Allmand, Christopher (September 2010). "10.1093/ref:odnb/12952". Oxford Dictionary of National Biography (online ed.). Oxford University Press. doi:10.1093/ref:odnb/12952. (Subscription, Wikipedia Library access or UK public library membership required.)
- Armitage, Ella S. (1904). "The Early Norman Castles of England. Part I". The English Historical Review. 19 (74): 209–245. doi:10.1093/ehr/XIX.LXXIV.209.
- Bly, Phil (2012). Guide to the complete Monmouth Heritage Blue Plaque Trail. Monmouth: Monmouth Civic Society. OCLC 797974800.
- Carpenter, David (2004). The Struggle for Mastery: Britain 1066-1284. London: Penguin Books. ISBN 0-14-014824-8.
- Evans, C. J. O. (1953). Monmouthshire: Its History and Topography. William Lewis Ltd.
- Gilpin, William (2005) [1782]. Observations on the River Wye. London: Pallas Athene. ISBN 978-1843-68197-7. OCLC 1118261174.
- Kenyon, John R. (2010). The Medieval Castles of Wales. Cardiff: University of Wales Press. ISBN 978-0-7083-2180-5. OCLC 693942235.
- Lieberman, Max (2008). The March of Wales, 1067-1300: a borderland of medieval Britain. Cardiff: University of Wales Press. ISBN 978-0-7083-2115-7.
- Matthews, James (1910). Historic Newport. Newport-on-Usk: The William Press Limited.
- Newman, John (2000). Gwent/Monmouthshire. The Buildings of Wales. London: Penguin. ISBN 0-14-071053-1.
- Prior, Stuart (2006). A Few Well Positioned Castles: The Norman Art of War. Tempus. ISBN 0-7524-3651-1.
- Rakoczy, Lila (2007). Archaeology of Destruction: A Reinterpretation of Castle Slightings in the English Civil War (PhD thesis). University of York. OCLC 931130655.
- Salter, Mike (2002). Castles of Gwent, Glamorgan and Gower. Malvern, UK: Folly Publications. ISBN 9781871731613. OCLC 54947157.
- Whittle, Elisabeth (1992). Glamorgan and Gwent. A Guide to Ancient and Historic Wales. London: HMSO. ISBN 9780117012219. OCLC 473187732.
