= HMS Monmouth =

Seven ships of the Royal Navy have been named HMS Monmouth. Monmouth was the name of a castle and is now the name of a town in Wales; the name also recognises James Scott, 1st Duke of Monmouth, the "Black Duke".

- HMS Monmouth (1666) was an 8-gun yacht launched in 1666 and sold in 1698.
- HMS Monmouth (1667) was a 66-gun third rate launched in 1667. She was rebuilt in 1700 and 1742, and was broken up in 1767.
- HMS Monmouth (1772) was a 64-gun third rate launched in 1772. She became a prison ship and named HMS Captivity in 1796, and was broken up in 1818.
- HMS Monmouth (1796) was a 64-gun third rate, originally the Indiaman Belmont. She was purchased on the stocks and launched in 1796. She became a sheer hulk in 1815 and was broken up in 1834.
- HMS Monmouth was a 46-gun fifth rate launched in 1828 as HMS Hotspur. She became a chapel hulk in 1859, was renamed HMS Monmouth in 1868, and sold in 1902.
- HMS Monmouth (1901) was a Monmouth-class armoured cruiser launched in 1901 and sunk at the Battle of Coronel in 1914.
- HMS Monmouth (F235) was a Type 23 frigate launched in 1991 and decommissioned in 2021. She was sold for scrapping in 2025.

== Battle honours ==
Ships named Monmouth have earned the following battle honours:

- Sole Bay 1672
- Texel 1673
- Barfleur 1692
- Vigo 1702
- Gibraltar 1704
- Velez Malaga 1704
- Marbella 1705
- Finisterre 1747
- Ushant 1747
- Foudroyant 1758
- Belle Isle 1761
- Sadras 1782
- Providien 1782
- Negapatam 1782
- Trincomalee 1782
- Camperdown 1797
- Egypt 1801
