= Royal Monmouthshire Royal Engineers =

Royal Monmouthshire Royal Engineers (Militia)
- Insignia of the R Mon RE (M)
- Active: 1539–present
- Country: United Kingdom
- Branch: British Army
- Type: Field Engineers
- Size: Regiment; 515 personnel
- Part of: 25 (Close Support) Engineer Group
- Regimental HQ: Monmouth Castle, Monmouth
- March: Ap Jenkyn (Regimental Quick March)
- Engagements: English Civil War; French Revolutionary Wars; Napoleonic Wars; Crimean War; Second Boer War; World War I; World War II; Bosnian War; Iraq War

Commanders
- Royal Honorary Colonel: Prince Richard, Duke of Gloucester
- Honorary Colonel: Colonel Ian Thompson

Insignia
- Arm Badge: Militia Flash

The Royal Monmouthshire Royal Engineers (Militia) is the most senior regiment of the British Army Reserve. The regiment was formed in 1539 during the reign of by King Henry VIII. The R Mon RE (M) became a militia unit in 1660 and then became a part of the Royal Engineers in 1877.

== History ==
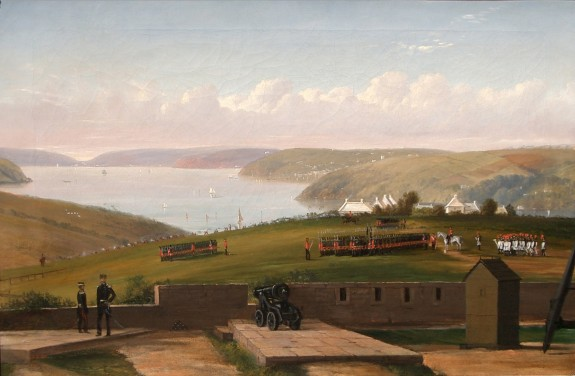
The Royal Monmouthshire Light Infantry in 1855 at Pembroke Dock.

=== The two 'Royals' ===
The regiment was formed as a posse comitatus in 1539 during the reign of by King Henry VIII; it went on to become a trained band and then a militia unit in 1660. It is unique in having the word 'Royal' appear twice in its name. It gained the first Royal in 1804 when it was the Monmouth and Brecon Militia. The second was acquired in 1896 when the regiment was retitled.

=== Seniority dispute with the Honourable Artillery Company ===
The records of the Honorable Artillery Company (HAC) indicate that it was formed two years prior to the Royal Monmouthshire Royal Engineers (Militia). However, in 1930 the Army Council (Army Board from 1964) reviewed the Army's precedence table and King George V agreed that, on account of its status as a militia unit, the Royal Monmouthshire Royal Engineers (Militia) were the senior regiment. In 1957 the matter was investigated further and Queen Elizabeth II also agreed that the Royal Monmouthshire Royal Engineers (Militia) were the senior regiment:

From:-Lieut.-Colonel The Rt. Hon. Sir Michael Adeane, K.C.B., K.C.V.O . Private Secretary to the Queen, Buckingham Palace, S.W.1. 12th March, 1957.

My dear Playfair, Thank you for your letter of 8th March which I have laid before The Queen and which Her Majesty has read with interest. I am to say that the recommendation of the Honours and Distinctions Committee with regard to the relative precedence of the Royal Monmouthshire Royal Engineers and the Honourable ArtiIlery Company meets with the Queen's approval.

Yours sincerely,

M. E. ADEANE

=== Militia and Militiamen ===
From 1852 to 1877, the regiment was styled as light infantry. In recognition of its Light Infantry ancestry the regiment was afforded the right to wear a shoulder flash in 1943.

=== Engineer role ===
Artillery Militia units had been created under the 1852 reforms; now the War Office decided that it needed similar support for the Royal Engineers (REs), whose role was growing in scale and importance. Two existing militia infantry regiments were chosen for conversion in 1877: the Royal Monmouth and the Royal Anglesey Militia. The former became the Royal Monmouthshire Engineers Militia on 1 April 1877, redesignated the Royal Monmouthshire Royal Engineers (Militia) (RMRE) from 1896.

On 1 April 1967, the existing regiment absorbed 43rd Wessex Division RE (TA), 48th South Midland Division RE (TA) and 53rd Welsh Division RE (TA).

=== The Royal Jersey Militia ===
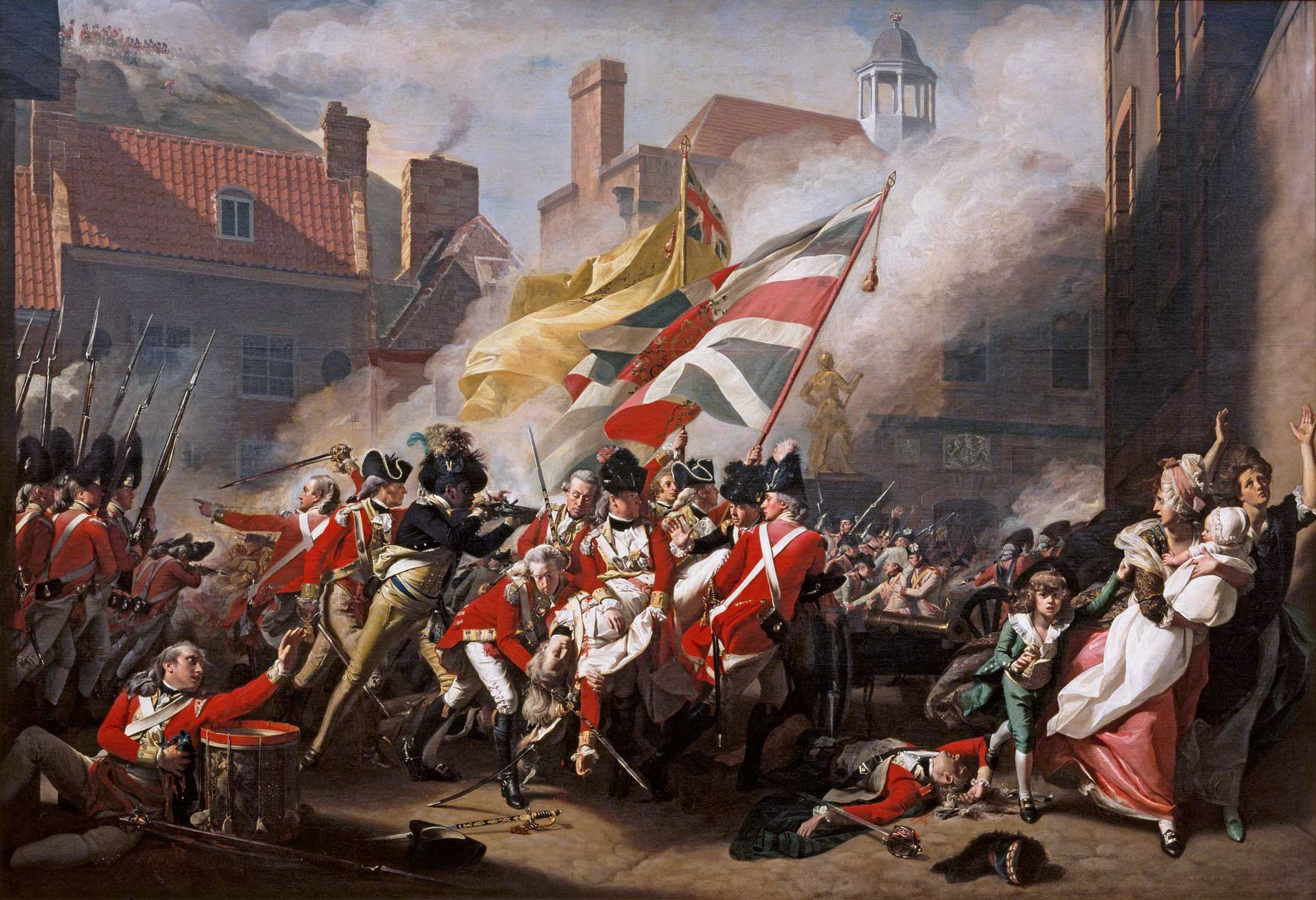
The Death of Major Peirson by John Singleton Copley.

The Jersey Militia were brought under the command of the R Mon RE (M) in 2007. The Jersey Militia was formed in 1337 when Edward III ordered "all his faithful peoples of the islands" to be prepared - by forming a militia - for possible war with France. The militia defended the island against several pirate raids, and in 1549 against a French invasion attempt. The militia played a role in the Battle of Jersey, for which its actions gained it the 'Royal' title.

== Current organisation ==
The current organisation of the regiment is as follows:

- Regimental Headquarters and Headquarters Troop, at Monmouth Castle
- 100 (Militia) Field Squadron, at Chapman House, Cwmbran
  - 1 Troop, at Artillery Grounds, Bristol
  - Cardiff Troop
- 108 (Welsh) Field Squadron (Militia), at John Chard VC House, Swansea
- 225 Field Squadron (Militia), at Gundolph House, Oldbury
  - 1 Troop, at Baskeyfield House, Stoke-on-Trent
  - 2 Troop, in Cannock
- Jersey Field Squadron (Royal Militia of the Island of Jersey), in Saint Helier, Jersey
  - Guernsey Troop, at Saint Peter Port, Guernsey

== Regimental museum ==
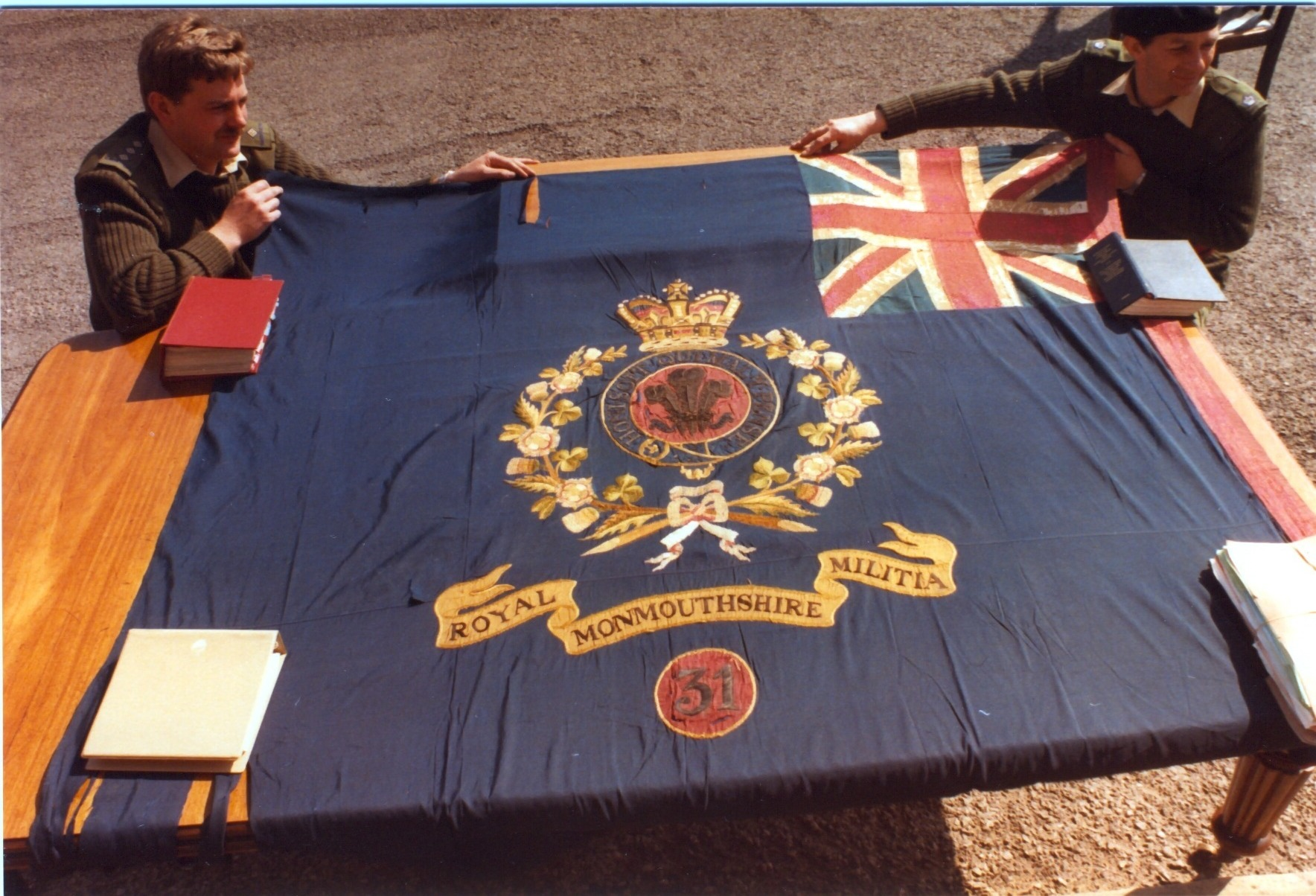
Colours of the Royal Monmouthshire Royal Engineers

The regimental museum of the Royal Monmouthshire Royal Engineers is in Monmouth Castle.

== Charitable trust ==
The Royal Monmouthshire Royal Engineers (Militia) Charitable Trust is a wholly voluntary charity that supports the wider life of the Regiment. It was registered in 2002 and is registered (Number 1093105) with the Charity Commission.

== Notable personnel ==
- Jules Hudson, television producer and presenter, best known for presenting the BBC series Escape to the Country.
- Jon Latimer, military historian, author, and part-time lecturer at Swansea University.
- John Williams, the last surviving Victoria Cross recipient of the engagement at Rorke's Drift.

== Order of precedence ==
Preceded by Royal Corps of Army Music	Order of Precedence	Succeeded by Honourable Artillery Company
