= The Cross, Monmouth =

Stone cross in Monmouth, Wales

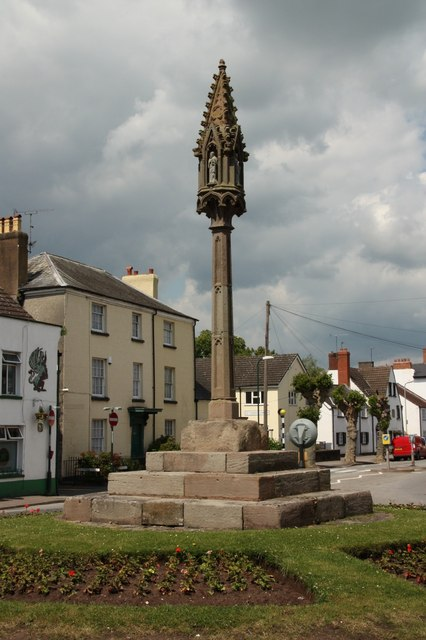
- The Cross in 2009
- Artist: H. Wall of Newport
- Year: 1888
- Medium: Stone
- Location: Monmouth; 51.808574°N 2.720728°W

The Cross is situated in St Thomas' Square, Overmonnow, Monmouth, Wales, in the middle of a roundabout opposite the Church of St Thomas the Martyr and the western end of the Monnow Bridge. Originally mediaeval, and also known as Overmonnow Cross, the cross was reconstructed in 1888 and has been classed as a Grade II listed structure since 15 August 1974.

== History ==
Some nineteenth century sources suggest that the original cross was in existence before 1039. St Thomas' Square was thought to have been a market place before Monnow Bridge linked Overmonnow to the rest of the town, and the cross may have been used for preaching at market times. On 1 April 1764, an 18-year-old woman was condemned at Monmouth assizes to be burned to death for poisoning her mistress. The sentence was carried out close to the Cross.

A cross is shown in its current location in John Speed's map of Monmouth, dated 1611. However, by the late 19th century the only portion left was the stone base, in the road close to the Green Dragon Inn. In 1888, Charles Henry Crompton-Roberts, of nearby Drybridge House, undertook to have the cross rebuilt and erected in the centre of the crossroads. At the time, and until the town was by-passed in 1966, the road was the main route into Monmouth from the west. Crompton-Roberts was said to have argued with the authorities about its reintroduction to the middle of the square, and the Vicar of St Thomas, Rev P Potter, was also said to have been instrumental in returning the cross to its original position. A new shaft was designed by architect F.A. Powell, who worked at the same time on renovations to St Thomas' church. It was built by William Simmonds and carved by H. Wall of Newport. Wall also carved the four figures in the recess of the cross, which are St Thomas, St Mary, St Michael and St Cenhadlon. H Wall was paid £70 for his work.

A drinking fountain was erected in 1897 next to the church, to celebrate Queen Victoria's Diamond Jubilee. A horse trough was installed next to the Cross at the same time, but complaints followed about the congestion and hazards caused by carts left standing around the cross and it was later removed. Besides the church the cross is also in front of The Green Dragon pub.

== Gallery ==
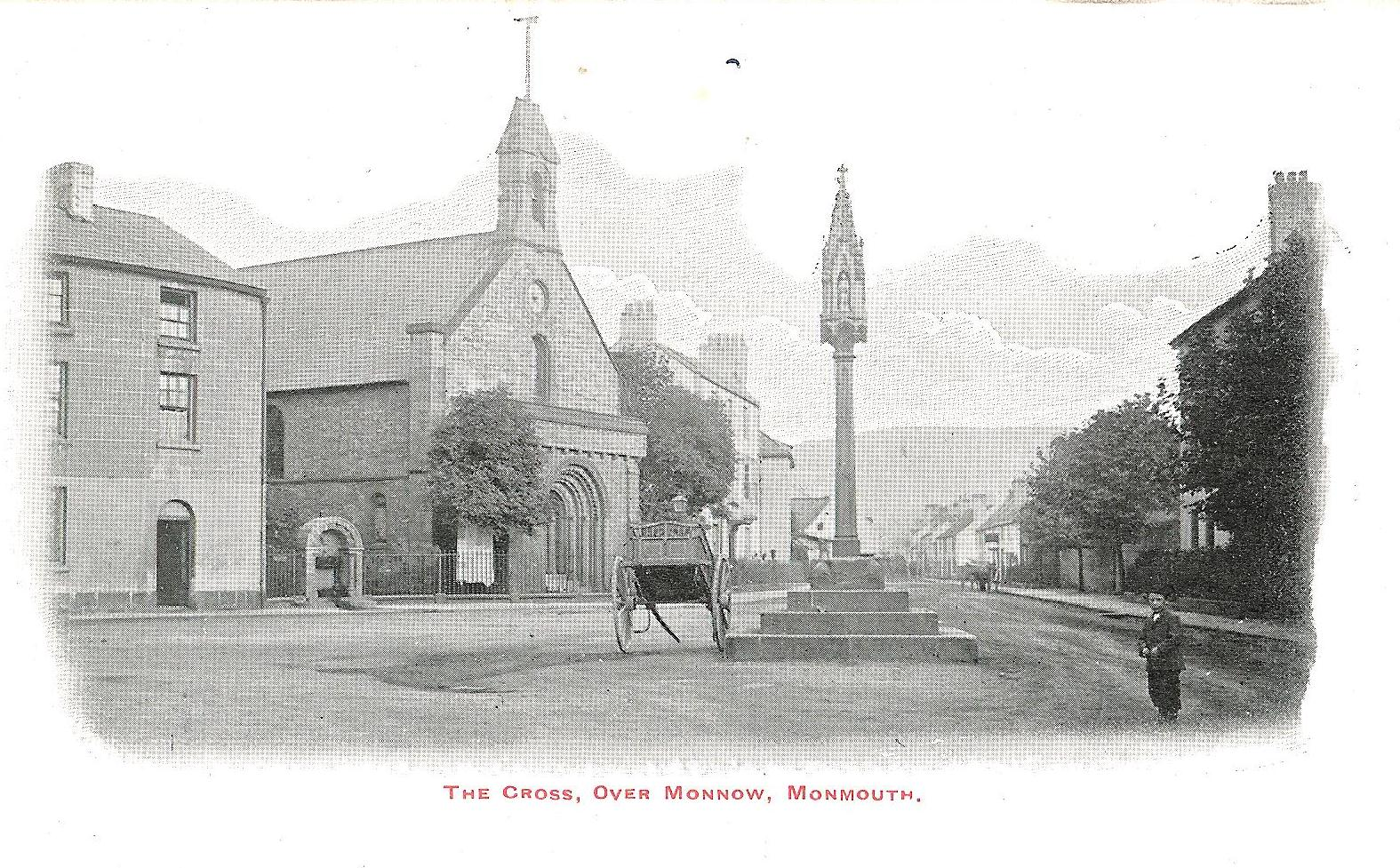
The Cross and St Thomas early 1900s

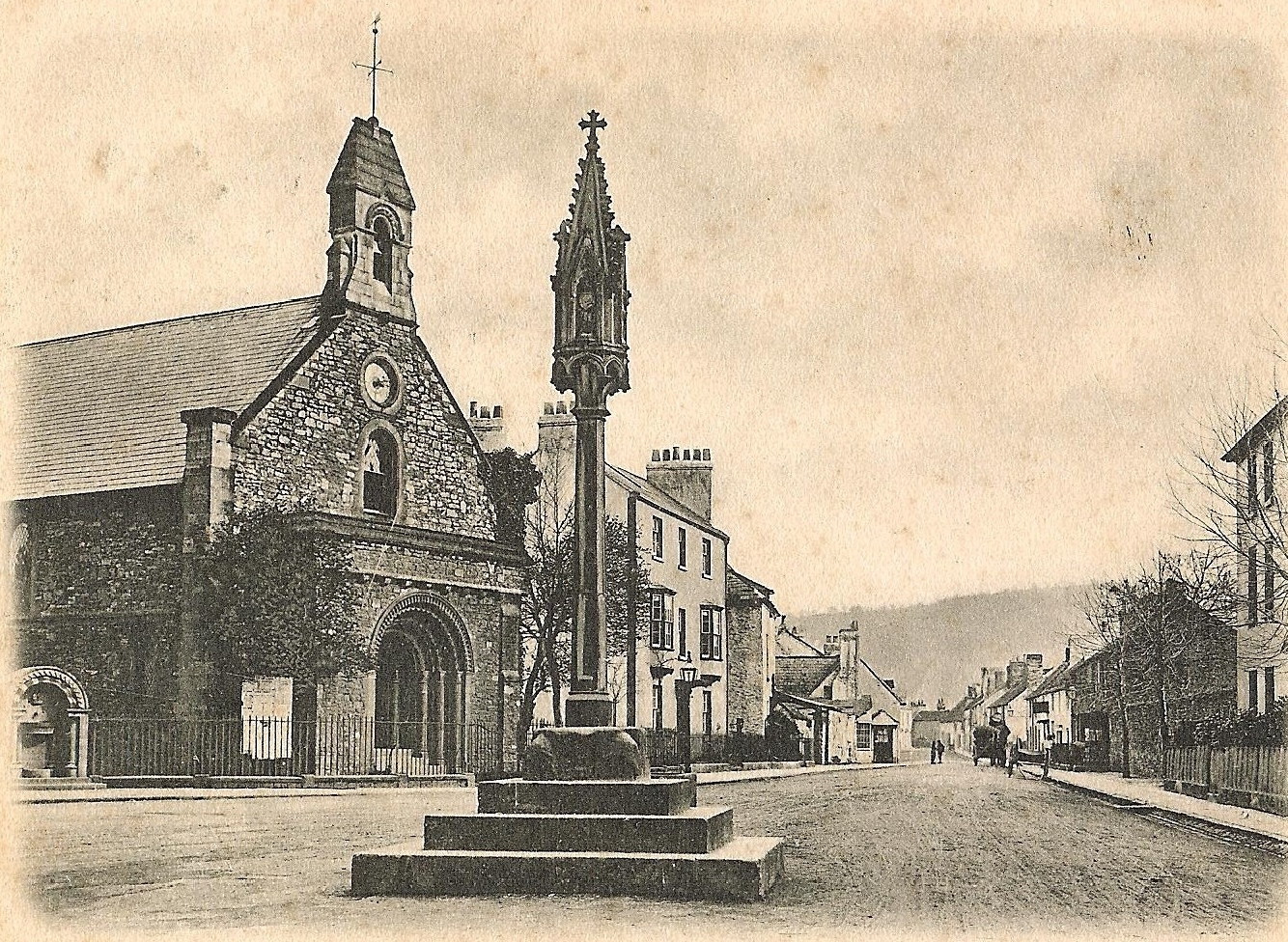
The Cross and St Thomas' Church in 1888

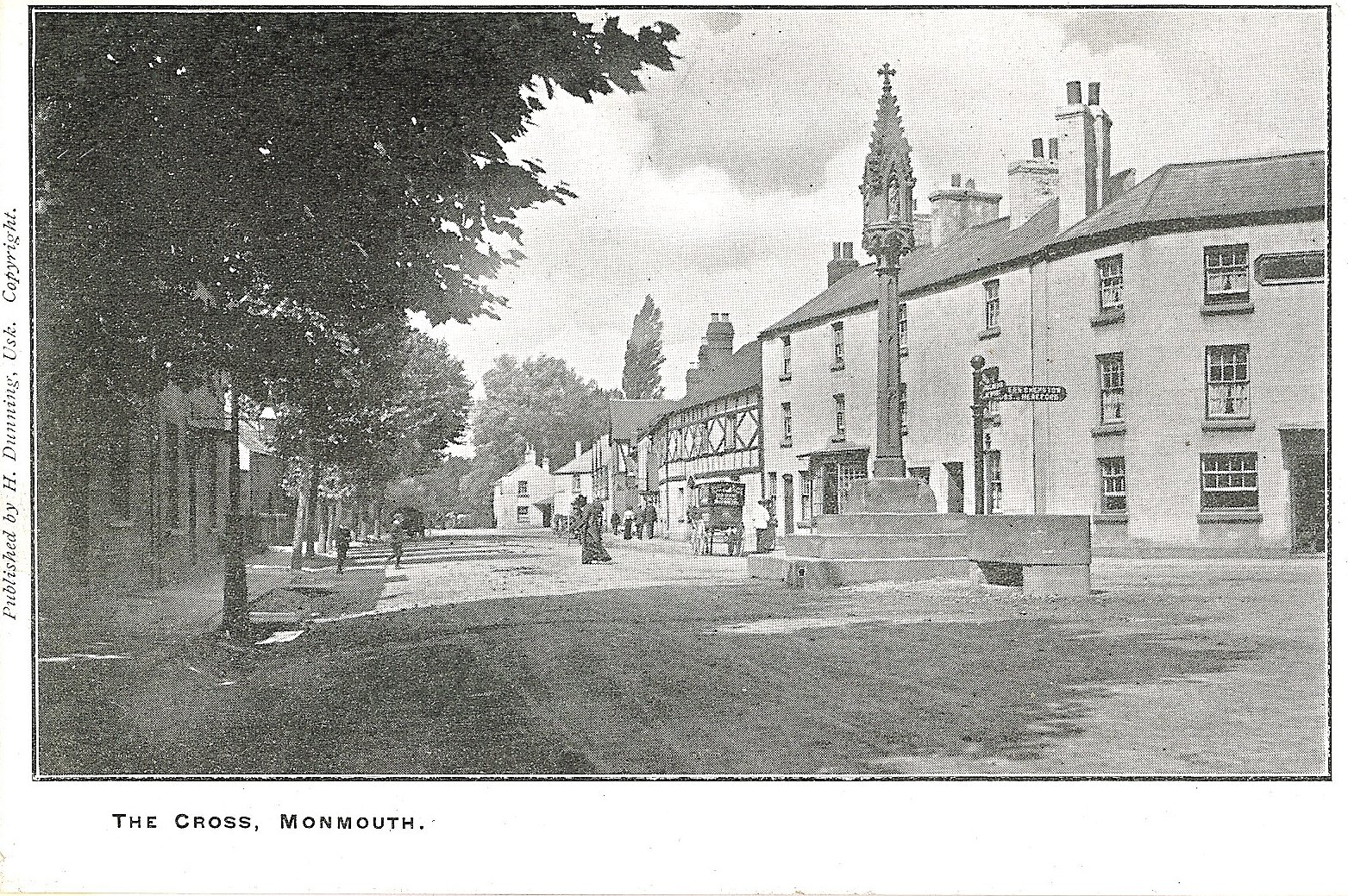
The Cross in the 1900s showing the horse trough.

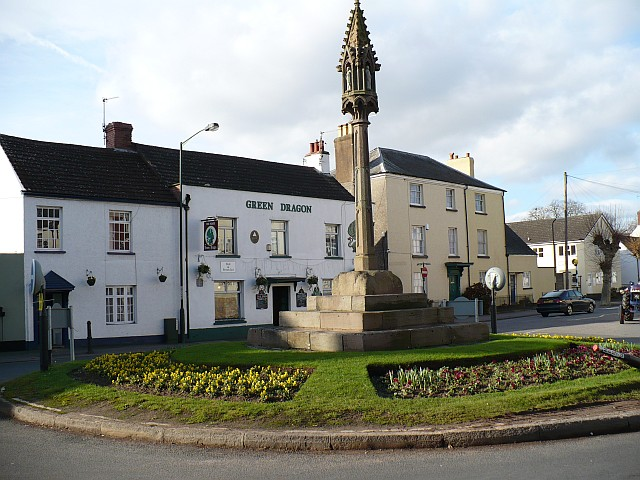
The Cross and Green Dragon Inn in 2008
