= Clawdd-du =

Clawdd-du Bridge
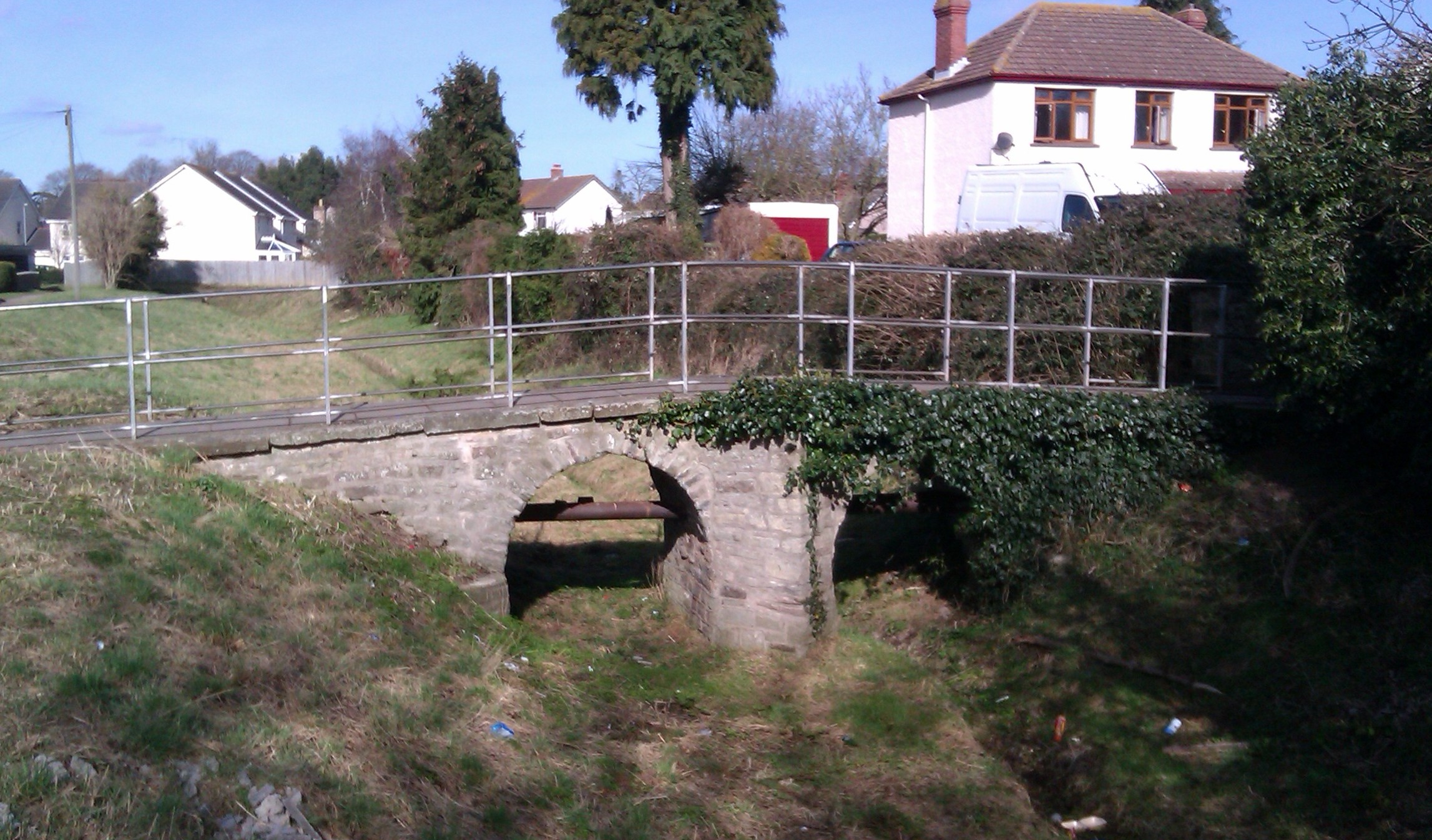
- Mediaeval bridge over the Clawdd-du
- Coordinates: 51.8070°N 2.7217°W
- Crosses: dry bed
- Locale: Monmouth, Wales

The Clawdd-du, also known in historical records as the Black Dyke, Black Ditch or Clawthy, is a mediaeval linear defensive earthwork or moat, constructed as protection for the faubourg of Overmonnow, on the opposite side of the River Monnow from the town and castle of Monmouth, Wales.

== History ==
The areas west of the River Monnow remained, in general, under Welsh control much later than the areas to the east, which included the town of Monmouth where the Normans established a castle shortly after 1067. The suburb of Overmonnow, which in mediaeval times was an important area for iron working and the manufacture of coarse woollen material including Monmouth caps, would have been vulnerable to attacks from the Welsh at the time the defences were constructed. Excavations in 1966 suggested that the ditch was excavated in two stages, before the mid-thirteenth century, and then again after the mid-fourteenth century.

The ditch originally extended, roughly in a semi-circle, for some 600 yards (550 m) from the River Monnow opposite Chippenham Fields, westwards and then northwards to the vicinity of the later Drybridge House. The defence comprised a water-filled ditch some 35 to 40 feet (10-12m) wide, with an embankment some 5 feet (1.5m) high on the side of the settlement, topped by a wooden palisade. It was probably possible to flood the ditch from the River Monnow. A mediaeval stone bridge across the ditch was in direct line with that of Monnow Street, in Monmouth, and the Monnow Bridge across the river. It carried the road from the town westwards towards the village of Wonastow.

The Clawdd-du defined the outer limit of development at Overmonnow until the 1930s.

== The Clawdd-du today ==
The Clawdd-du is now partly infilled, but still exists for most of its length as a broad ditch used for drainage. It is a Scheduled Ancient Monument, and the remains of the mediaeval bridge are a Grade II* listed building. In 2010, local archaeologists objected to Monmouthshire County Council because a trench had been dug along the site without proper consent.
