= The Green Dragon, Monmouth =

The Green Dragon
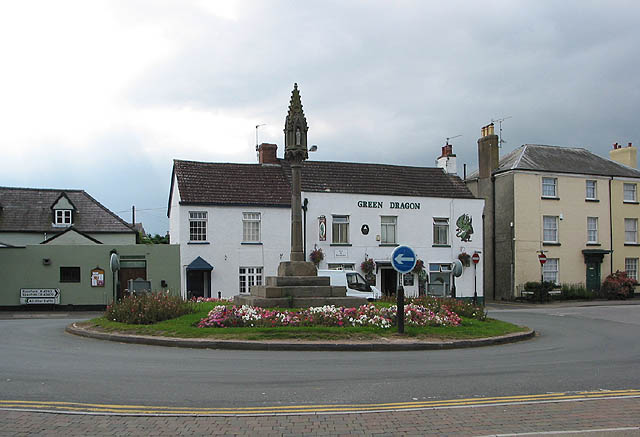
- Interactive map of the The Green Dragon area
- Former names: The Green Dragon Inn
- Alternative names: The Dragon

General information
- Type: Public House
- Location: St Thomas Square, Monmouth, Wales
- Coordinates: 51.808532°N 2.720971°W
- Completed: Before 1801

The Green Dragon is a public house and inn located in St Thomas Square in Overmonnow, Monmouth, Wales. The pub provides live music on weekend evenings, live sport on a regular basis and during the annual Monmouth Festival the pub is used as a venue for entertainment.

== History ==
The pub is the oldest surviving pub in the Overmonnow area. It was established as an inn before 1801 when the keys for St Thomas Church were kept there. In 1830s beer tokens were issued by landlord Thomas Powell, who was followed by several members of his family as licensee. Following that, James Gwilliam was the licensee for decades of the 19th century.

In 1998 an archaeological dig evaluation carried out behind the inn produced medieval finds such as cooking utensils and clay pipes dating from the 18th and 19th centuries. In addition, in the 17th and 18th century the site was also utilised and extensively disturbed to recover iron slag.

The Green Dragon faces one of the entrances to the medieval Monnow Bridge and the Church of St Thomas the Martyr. The pub currently faces a traffic island that includes a restored cross.
