= Charles Henry Crompton-Roberts =

British landowner and politician

- Born: Charles Henry Roberts; 7 March 1832; Pedmore, Worcestershire, England
- Died: 15 November 1891 (aged 59); Belgrave Square, London
- Occupations: Landowner; Politician
- Known for: Restoration of Drybridge House, Monmouth; Member of Parliament for Sandwich, 1880–81

Charles Henry Crompton-Roberts (né Roberts; 7 March 1832 – 15 November 1891) was a British landowner and politician. He was briefly a Member of Parliament before his election was annulled in 1880, and was a substantial contributor to the amenities and community of Monmouth in Wales.

== Biography ==
Charles Henry Roberts was born in Pedmore, Worcestershire, the son of Charles Roberts and Marianne (née Noble). His father was a descendant of William Roberts, who had been responsible for rebuilding Drybridge House, Monmouth, as the family's home in the late 17th century. In 1861, Charles Henry Roberts married Mary Crompton, an only child and heiress from Breightmet, near Bolton, Lancashire. He sought and received royal assent to add the name of Crompton to his own surname, so enabling him to inherit her family's estates.

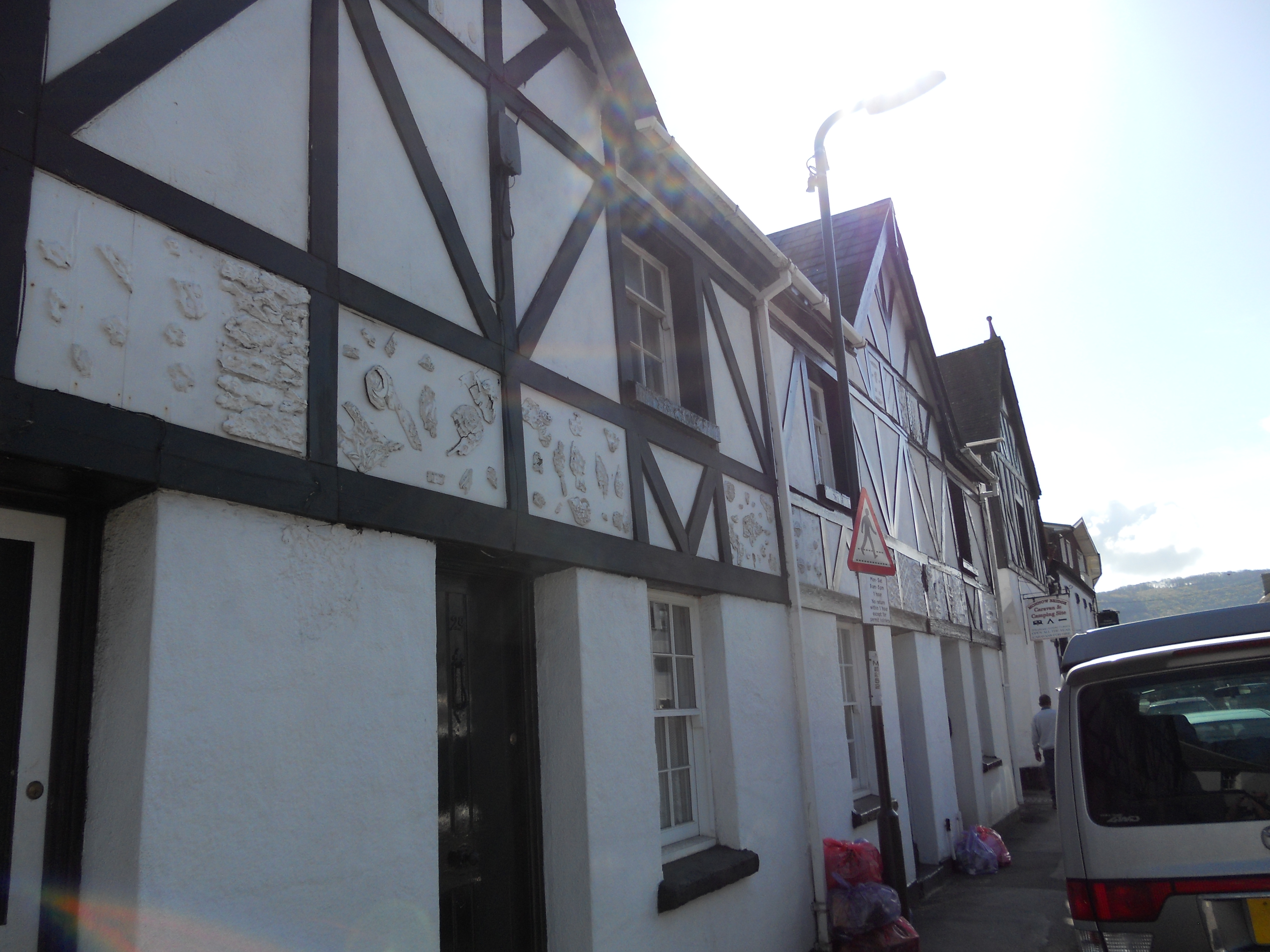
House walls in Drybridge Street, Monmouth, showing the wooden wallpaper blocks provided as decorative features by Crompton-Roberts

Crompton-Roberts acquired Drybridge House in 1867, and carried out its restoration and enlargement. While retaining the period features of the existing building, he added a new south wing and commissioned a number of stained glass windows. He also designed a fine parkland garden around the house, incorporating a cricket pitch upon which W. G. Grace later played. Another family friend was Edward Elgar, who married one of Charles' Worcestershire cousins, Alice Roberts. Crompton-Roberts purchased land at Trellech Grange from the Duke of Beaufort in 1875, and was appointed High Sheriff of Monmouthshire in 1877.

In 1880, he stood as the Conservative candidate in a by-election for the parliamentary constituency of Sandwich in Kent, where the previous Liberal Member of Parliament (MP), Edward Knatchbull-Hugessen, had been raised to the peerage. Crompton-Roberts stood against the Liberal candidate, Sir Julian Goldsmid, and won the election by 1145 votes to 705. Although Crompton-Roberts took his seat as an MP, the result was annulled after a few months, following a report by a Royal Commission set up to investigate the election. This revealed extravagantly corrupt practices by both sides in offering bribes for votes, which had been a feature of elections in Sandwich for many years. Crompton-Roberts forfeited his seat in Parliament in 1881, the seat was left vacant, and the constituency was abolished before the subsequent General Election.

He continued to contribute financially to the amenities of Monmouth, and was responsible for the reconstruction in 1888 of the mediaeval Cross opposite the Church of St Thomas in Overmonnow, near Drybridge House. He also decorated houses in Drybridge Street, and his own summer houses, with large wooden blocks used in the hand printing of wallpaper. At the time of his death he held the positions of Governor of Monmouth School and Monmouthshire County Magistrate, and represented the Borough on Monmouthshire County Council. He was also reported to be sole proprietor of the varnish manufacturing firm Noble and Hoare, of Cornwall Road, Lambeth.

== Death and memorials ==
He died at his London home at 16 Belgrave Square in 1891. He was reported to have suffered from acute neuralgia for which he had sought several cures including hypnosis, but without success.

His funeral was held on 19 November 1891. Crompton-Roberts had requested to be buried at St Mary's Priory Church in Monmouth, but the churchyard was closed for new burials so he was buried at Rockfield Church and burying ground a few miles away. Blinds were drawn and shutters put in place in Monmouth for the funeral as a mark of respect. The borough maces and mace bearers were present, as was the Mayor of Monmouth. The staff sergeants of the Royal Monmouthshire Royal Engineers Militia formed the guard of honour. It was reported that 40 staff from Noble and Hoare attended the funeral.

His estate was worth £274,147 7s 6d, not including an insurance policy he had worth £100,000. He owned Drybridge House at Monmouth, Field House at Clent, and 16 Belgrave Square, London. Memorial stained glass windows were dedicated in his memory at St Mary's in Monmouth, and at Trellech

He had three sons: Henry Roger Crompton-Roberts, DSO, and officer in the Grenadier Guards; Charles Montague Crompton-Roberts, who became High Sheriff of Monmouthshire in 1897; and Leicester Neville Crompton-Roberts, who is buried in Highgate Cemetery (west side); and two daughters, Violet Mary and Mildred Theodora.
