= Overmonnow =

- Ward, suburb
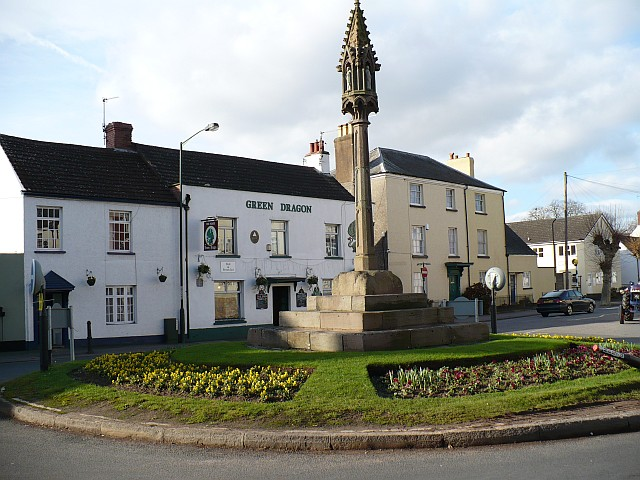
- Restored mediaeval cross and Green Dragon Inn, St Thomas Square, Overmonnow
- Nicknames: Little Monmouth; Cappers' Town
- Interactive map of Overmonnow
- Coordinates: 51°48′31″N 2°43′14″W
- Country: Wales
- County: Monmouthshire
- Town: Monmouth

Overmonnow is a suburb of the town of Monmouth, in Wales, which is located to the west of the River Monnow and the Monnow Bridge. It developed in the Middle Ages, when it was protected by a defensive ditch, the Clawdd-du or "Black Dyke", the remains of which are now protected as an ancient monument. In later centuries the area became known as "Little Monmouth" or "Cappers' Town".

== History ==
At the time of the Norman conquest, the area to the east of the River Monnow, and north of the River Wye, was in the area known as Archenfield, which lay within the Earldom of Hereford and was considered to be part of England; areas to the west of the Monnow, including the Overmonnow area, were regarded as Welsh. After the Normans built Monmouth Castle, the town of Monmouth gradually developed as a market town, a river port, and as a centre for the manufacture of iron goods and woollen fabric. By the twelfth century, development had taken place beyond the Monnow Bridge at Overmonnow, forming a suburb or faubourg. The mediaeval iron industry at Overmonnow resulted in the wastage of large piles of cinders; these "cinder hills", which gave their name to Cinderhill Street, were removed in the eighteenth century. The area was also known for the manufacture of woollen fabric, particularly Monmouth caps which were popular between the fifteenth and eighteenth centuries, and as a result the Overmonnow area supposedly became known as "Cappers' Town", although this has been questioned.

The area was also known as "Little Monmouth". In the nineteenth century, there was a belief that "Little Monmouth" had at one time been a separate borough from the rest of the town, or "Great Monmouth". This seems to be a legend deriving from a pageant arranged to celebrate the coronation of Queen Victoria in 1838, in which the so-called "mayor of Overmonnow" demanded admittance to the town across Monnow Bridge, and then rode around the town with the (real) mayor of Monmouth. However, the bridge was the scene of annual battles, or "muntlings", between rival gangs from "Up-Town" and "Cappers' Town". These took place on 1 May and 29 May, the youths arming themselves with besoms or "muntles" reinforced with stones. The altercations were banned in 1858.

Substantial development, for both housing and light industry, has taken place in the Overmonnow area since the mid twentieth century. In the 2001 census, the Overmonnow ward had a total resident population of 2,300, within 1,104 separate households. The ward is currently represented on Monmouthshire County Council by Cllr. Susan White, of the Conservative Party. The area is also the site of the Monnow Vale Integrated Health and Social Care Facility at Drybridge Park.

== Clawdd-du ==
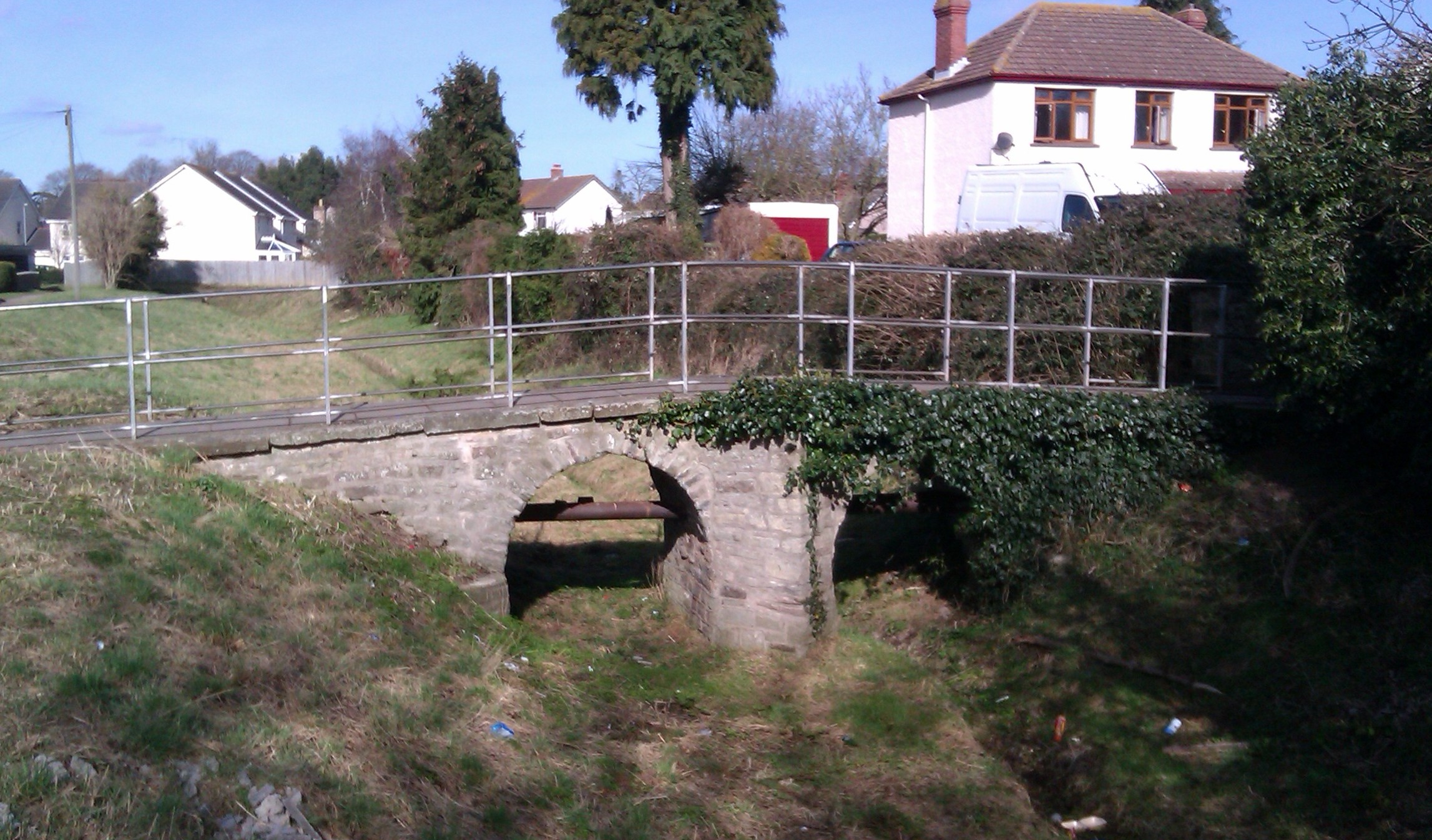
Mediaeval bridge over Clawdd-du

The Clawdd-du, or "Black Dyke", was a linear defensive earthwork or moat constructed as protection for the mediaeval suburb of Overmonnow. It originally extended, roughly in a semi-circle, for some 600 yards (550 m) from the River Monnow opposite Chippenham Fields, westwards and then northwards to the vicinity of the later Drybridge House. The defence comprised a water-filled ditch some 35 to 40 feet (10-12m) wide. It is now partly infilled, but still exists for most of its length as a broad ditch used for drainage. It is a Scheduled Ancient Monument, and the remains of the mediaeval bridge across it are a Grade II* listed building.

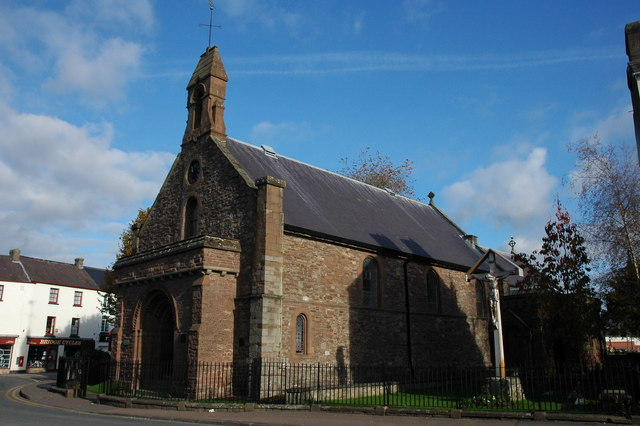
Church of St Thomas the Martyr

== Notable buildings ==
The Church of St Thomas the Martyr, on the Overmonnow side of the Monnow Bridge, dates at least from the twelfth century. In 1830, it was given its own parish, separate from that of the Priory Church of St Mary in Monmouth town centre. The cross, in the middle of the roundabout beside the church, is of mediaeval origin but was heavily restored in 1888. Overmonnow House, opposite the church, is a former vicarage with a five-bayed Georgian frontage.

Drybridge House was built in 1671 by William Roberts, on the site of an earlier farmhouse. The house was owned for 400 years by the Crompton-Roberts family. It now houses a community and day care centre. Buildings along the road between Drybridge House and the bridge incorporate in their walls large wooden wallpaper blocks formerly used for hand printing, which were provided in the nineteenth century by the Crompton-Roberts family, who owned a printing business.

== Governance ==
Overmonnow is a community electoral ward for Monmouth Town Council, electing four town councillors. At the May 2017 elections one of the long-standing Conservative councillors lost her seat to Labour candidate Su McConnel. However, the Conservatives regained the seat at a by-election in April 2018.

Overmonnow is also a county ward which elects a county councillor to sit on Monmouthshire County Council. At the May 2022 elections the seat was won by Steven Garratt for Welsh Labour.
