= Battle of Monmouth (1233) =

Part of the rebellion of Richard Marshal against Henry III

- Part of the rebellion of Richard Marshal against Henry III
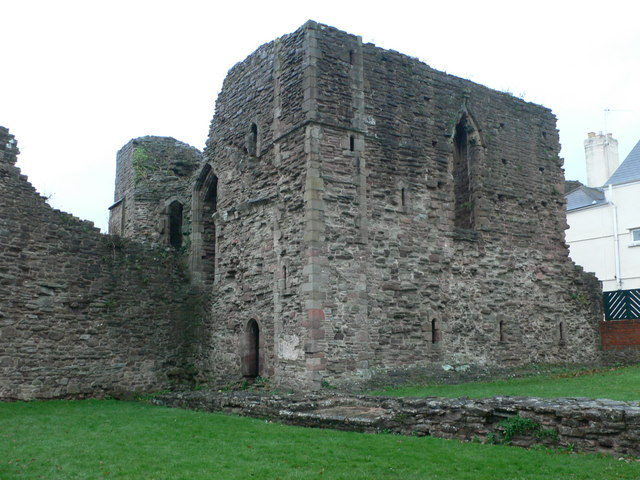
- The ruined Great Tower of Monmouth Castle
Date	25 November 1233
Location	Monmouth 51.813°N 2.725°W
Result	Rebel victory

Belligerents
Kingdom of England; County of Flanders	English rebels Principality of Wales

Commanders and leaders
Baldwin III	Richard Marshal

Strength
?	?

Casualties and losses
Heavy	

The Battle of Monmouth took place on 25 November 1233, the feast day of St Catherine, between forces loyal to Henry III, King of England, and those of Richard Marshal, Earl of Pembroke and Lord Marshal of England, who had formed an alliance with the Welsh prince Llywelyn ap Iorwerth and his supporter Owain ap Gruffydd, a grandson of Rhys of Deheubarth.

== Background ==
Richard Marshal, the second son of the more famous William Marshal, 1st Earl of Pembroke, was a leader of the barons opposed to the growth of King Henry's powers. He was an adversary of the king's foreign allies at court, notably the Poitevins Peter de Rivaux and Peter des Roches. Marshal refused to attend Henry's court at Gloucester in August 1233, and Henry declared him a traitor. Marshal retired to his castle at Striguil (Chepstow), while the king and his army moved west to Abergavenny. In response, Marshal joined with Owain to seize the castles at Cardiff and Newport before attacking Abergavenny and Grosmont. The king then retreated to Gloucester.

== Battle ==
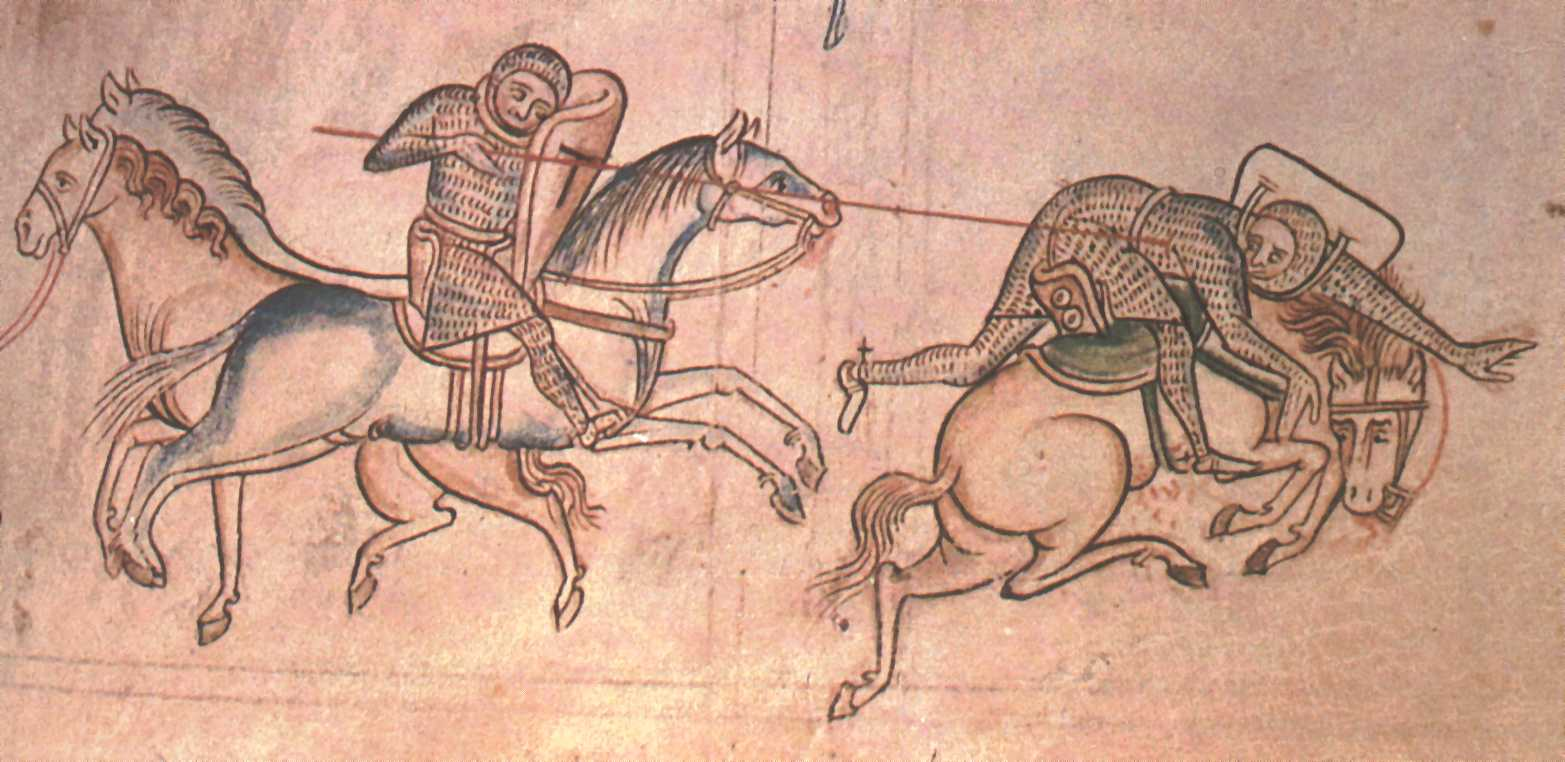
Richard Marshal unhorses Baldwin at a joust. From the Chronica Majora of Matthew Paris.

According to the chronicler Roger of Wendover in his Flores Historiarum (Flowers of History), Marshal and his knights then came to Monmouth to reconnoitre the town before besieging it. However, they were seen coming towards the castle walls by Baldwin III, Count of Guînes. He was a nobleman of Flanders who, with his mixed force of Flemings and Poitevins, had been entrusted by King Henry with defending the town. The local lord, John of Monmouth, was absent from the battle. Baldwin wrongly thought that Marshal had only a few followers with him, and rode out with his forces to pursue him, but Marshal turned the tables. It was said of Marshal, in defending himself against Baldwin's men, that:

"he...kept them at a distance, brandishing his sword right and left, and struck down whoever came within reach, either killing them or stunning them by the force of his blows, and although engaged single-handed against twelve enemies, defended himself for a length of time. His enemies at length, not daring to approach him, killed the horse he rode with their lances; but the Marshal, who was well practised in the French way of fighting, seized one of the knights who was attacking him by the feet, and dragged him to the ground, and then quickly mounting his adversary's horse, he renewed the battle... At this juncture... a cross-bowman amongst the Marshal's company, seeing his lord in danger, discharged an arrow from his bow, which, striking Baldwin, who was dragging the Marshal away, in the breast, entered his body, notwithstanding his armour, and he fell to the earth believing himself mortally wounded... Whilst these events were passing, news had been carried to the Marshal's army of the danger he was in, on which they marched with all haste to his assistance, and soon put his enemies to flight. A bridge in the neighbourhood of the castle, over which the fugitives hoped to make their escape, was found to be broken, on which great numbers of them threw themselves into the river and were drowned with their horses and arms; others, having no means of escape, were slain by their pursuers, and some were made prisoners, and few of those who had sallied out from the castle returned safe."

== Aftermath ==
After the battle, which Baldwin survived, John of Monmouth returned to take control of the town. Marshal travelled to Ireland to rally his supporters there. He agreed a truce with Henry early in 1234, but died of wounds sustained in the Battle of the Curragh shortly afterwards.

The battle was depicted in an illustration by 13th-century historian Matthew Paris, which shows Richard Marshal unhorsing Baldwin of Guisnes. The original is owned by Corpus Christi College, Cambridge.

== Location ==
The Glamorgan-Gwent Archaeological Trust refer to the battle as having taken place at Castle Field, to the west of the River Monnow, land today known as Vauxhall Fields. Other sources suggest, on the basis of an order placed in 1234 for thirty oaks from the Forest of Dean to repair the Church of St Thomas the Martyr, located to the south-west of the town, that the adjoining Monnow Bridge would have been the one mentioned in the chronicle of the fighting and which was partly destroyed at that time.
