= Church of St Thomas the Martyr, Monmouth =

Church of St Thomas the Martyr
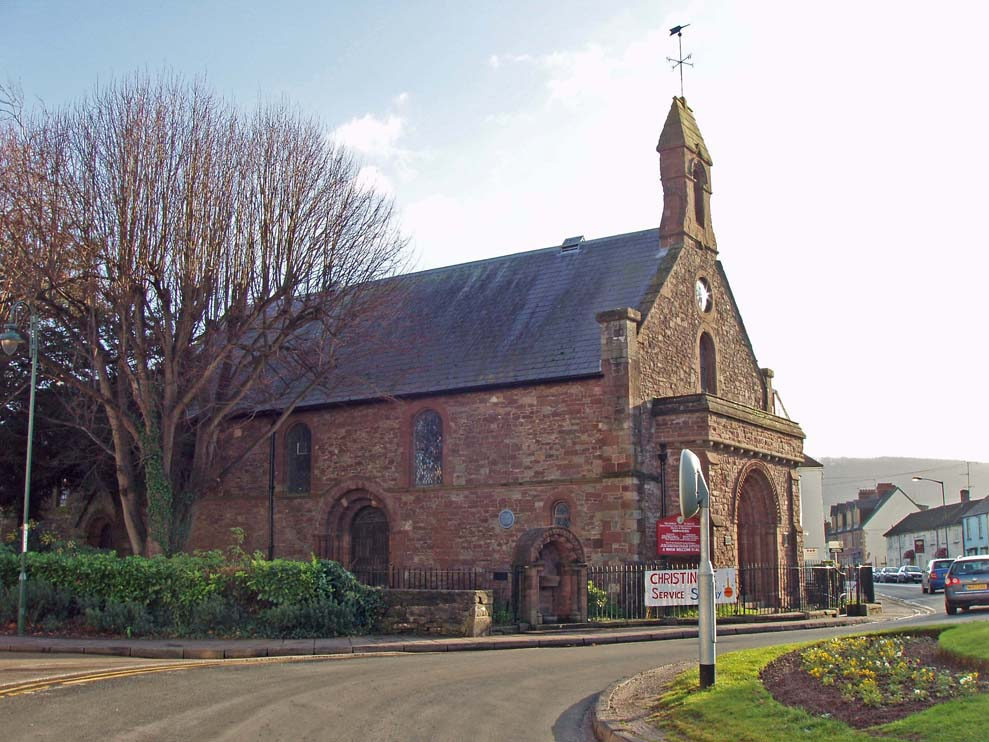
- St Thomas' Church, Overmonnow, Monmouth
- Church of St Thomas the Martyr
- 51°48′30.54″N 2°43′13.47″W
- Location: Monmouth, Monmouthshire
- Country: Wales
- Denomination: Church in Wales
- Website: monmouthparishes.org

Administration
- Diocese: Monmouth

Clergy
- Vicar: Rev David McGladdery

The Church of St Thomas the Martyr at Overmonnow, Monmouth, south east Wales, is located beside the medieval Monnow Bridge across the River Monnow. At least part of the building dates from around 1180, and it has a fine 12th-century Norman chancel arch, though the exterior was largely rebuilt in the early 19th century. It is one of 24 buildings on the Monmouth Heritage Trail and is a Grade II* listed building.

== History and architecture ==
The building is constructed of Old Red Sandstone. Dedicated to St Thomas à Becket, it became a chapel-of-ease to St Mary's Priory Church as it did not have its own parish. It is listed in a papal edict by Pope Urban III in 1186. It is thought to have existed in 1170 although Charles Heath in 1800 reported evidence of earlier Saxon design in the shape of the architecture.

Both St Thomas' and the nearby Monnow Bridge were damaged by fire in the Battle of Monmouth in 1233, part of the series of uprisings against Henry III by his barons. This required the church to be repaired using over a dozen oaks supplied by the Constable of St Briavels in Gloucestershire. The wood was delivered by royal command from the Forest of Dean the following year. In the year 1256 anchorites were living in St Thomas's.

John Gilbert, Bishop of Hereford found a leaking vestry roof that was being ignored by the parish in 1397. In 1610 the church was still small with a tower. It appears to have been badly neglected by the early 19th century; in 1829, Bishop Huntingford's inspection referred to it as "this dilapidated and forsaken church". His inspection also records the disproportionately small turret placed above the west gable when, in 1830, St Thomas's ceased to be a chapel of rest and it was given its own parish distinct from St Mary's. A major restoration and extension of the church was completed by the London architect Thomas Henry Wyatt, who added box pews with raised galleries. The oak galleries, on both sides above the nave, are still present today. The vestries were constructed in 1887–8.

The dog's tooth Norman chancel arch is still untouched and the piscina in the south wall, and two doorways on the opposite wall also appear to be original. The church has two fonts. That on the south wall has a pillar base with scrollwork and a bowl with images of the faces of a man and a woman, pelicans and a serpent in a Garden of Eden theme. Scholarship as to its date has developed. Until the late 20th century, it was generally considered to be an unusually well preserved example of a 12th-century font. John Guy and Ewart Smith, in their 1979 study, Ancient Gwent Churches, describe it as "very ancient". This dating echoes E. T. Davies, who suggests, in his 1977 booklet, The Ancient Churches of Gwent, that the styling of the pillar indicates that the font "goes back to the end of the eleventh century". The church itself labels the font as "early". However, Davies noted that the pillar and bowl may be of different periods and suggested that "expert examination may modify this conclusion". John Newman, in his 2000 Pevsner Gwent/Monmouthshire, does just that, recording the wooden conical cover as "clearly of the 1830s" and the font as "a pastiche of the same date". Cadw follows Newman, describing the font as having a "19th century interlace stem and [a] charming, possibly recut, Romanesque bowl". A second plain font may date from the 15th century. Further work by the Welsh architect John Prichard was completed in 1875. The west turret was replaced by a bell arch. The east window dates from 1957, and the church was last restored in 1989–91. On the east side beside the road there is a garden of rest with a calvary cross. The church sits on land between the road and the river Monnow and a contemporary ceramic mosaic has been installed by Monmouth Town Council. The circular plinth is made of 40 tiles that illustrate and commemorate the Millennium showing over 2,000 years of local history.

=== Church Incumbents ===
- 1830 Joseph Fawcett Beddy
- 1870 Thomas O. Tudor
- 1879 Peter Potter
- 1891 Francis Dudley
- 1915 James Percy Lax Amos
- 1923 H. Raymond Harvey
- 1924 Ernest Anderson Thorne
- 1939 Edmund Loftus MacNaghten
- 1942 Ronald Davies
- 1943 Edmund Ronald James Henry
- 1947 Oliver Vivian Griffiths
- 1964 Norman Havelock Price
- 1993 Julian Francis Gray
- 1998 Richard Pain
- 2009 David McGladdery

== Gallery ==
=== Historical images ===
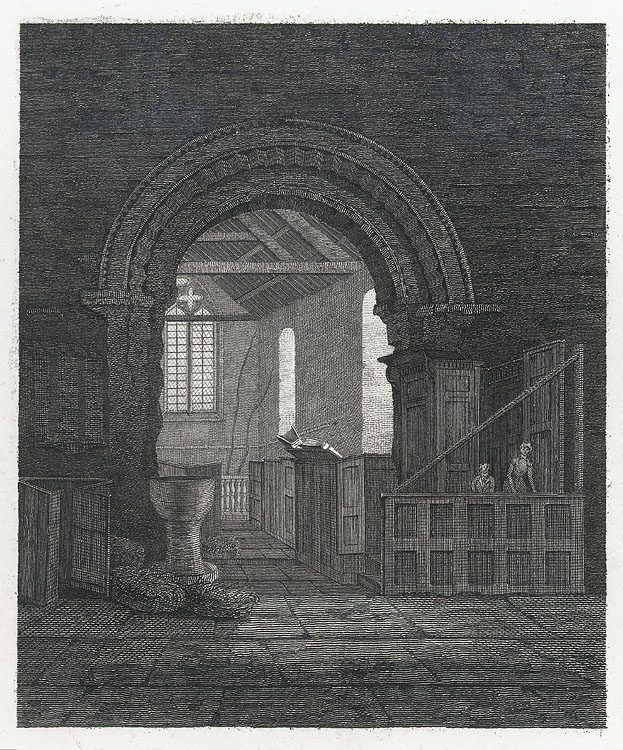
engraving showing interior of church c. 1800

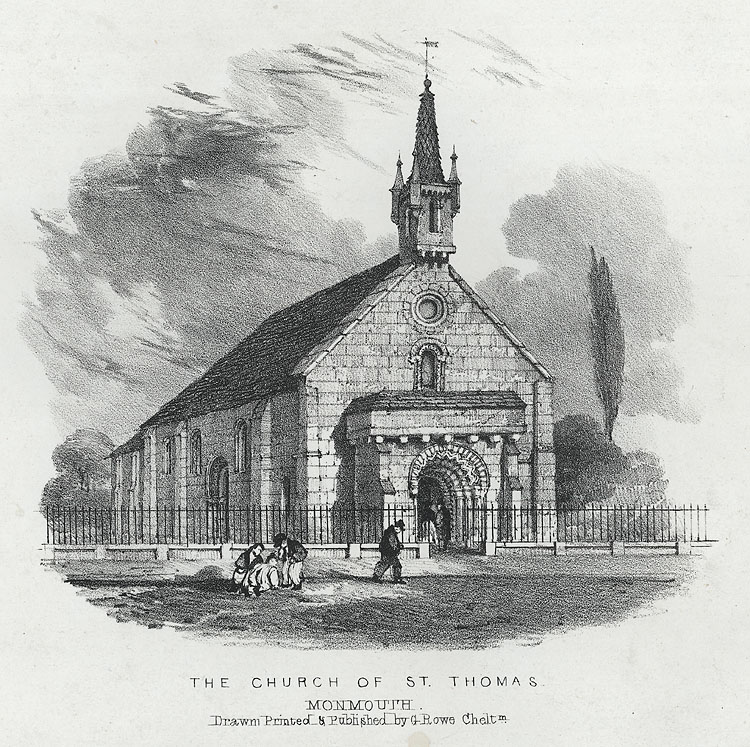
the church in 1845

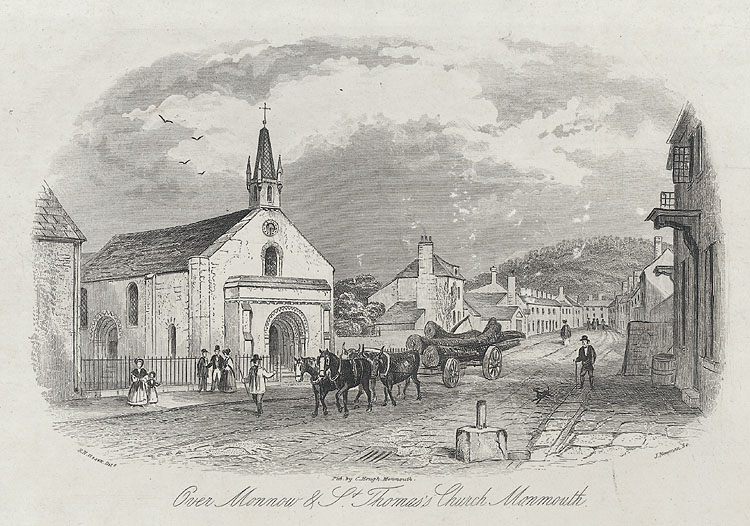
engraving by C. Hough of 1845

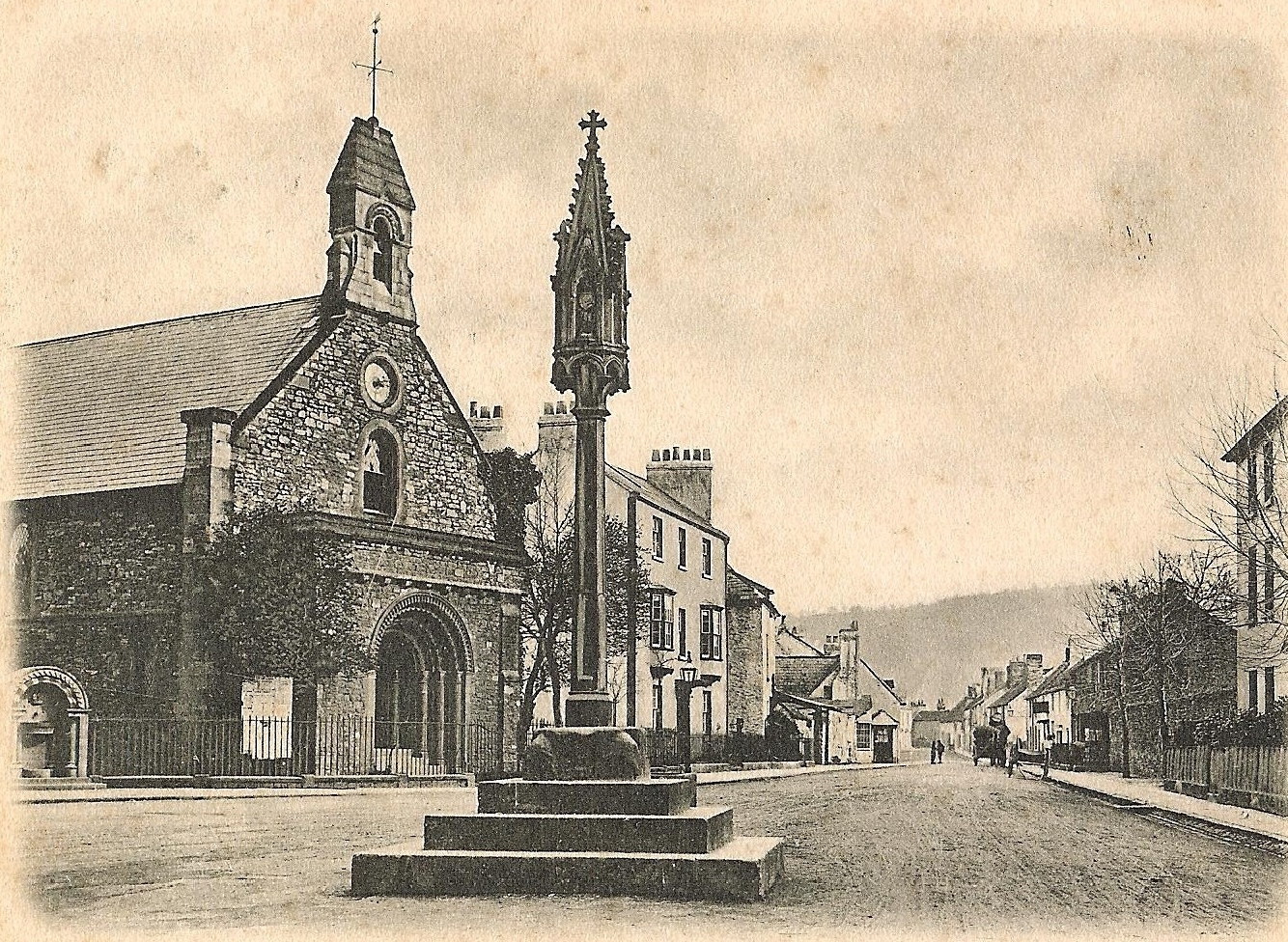
St Thomas Square & Cross 1904

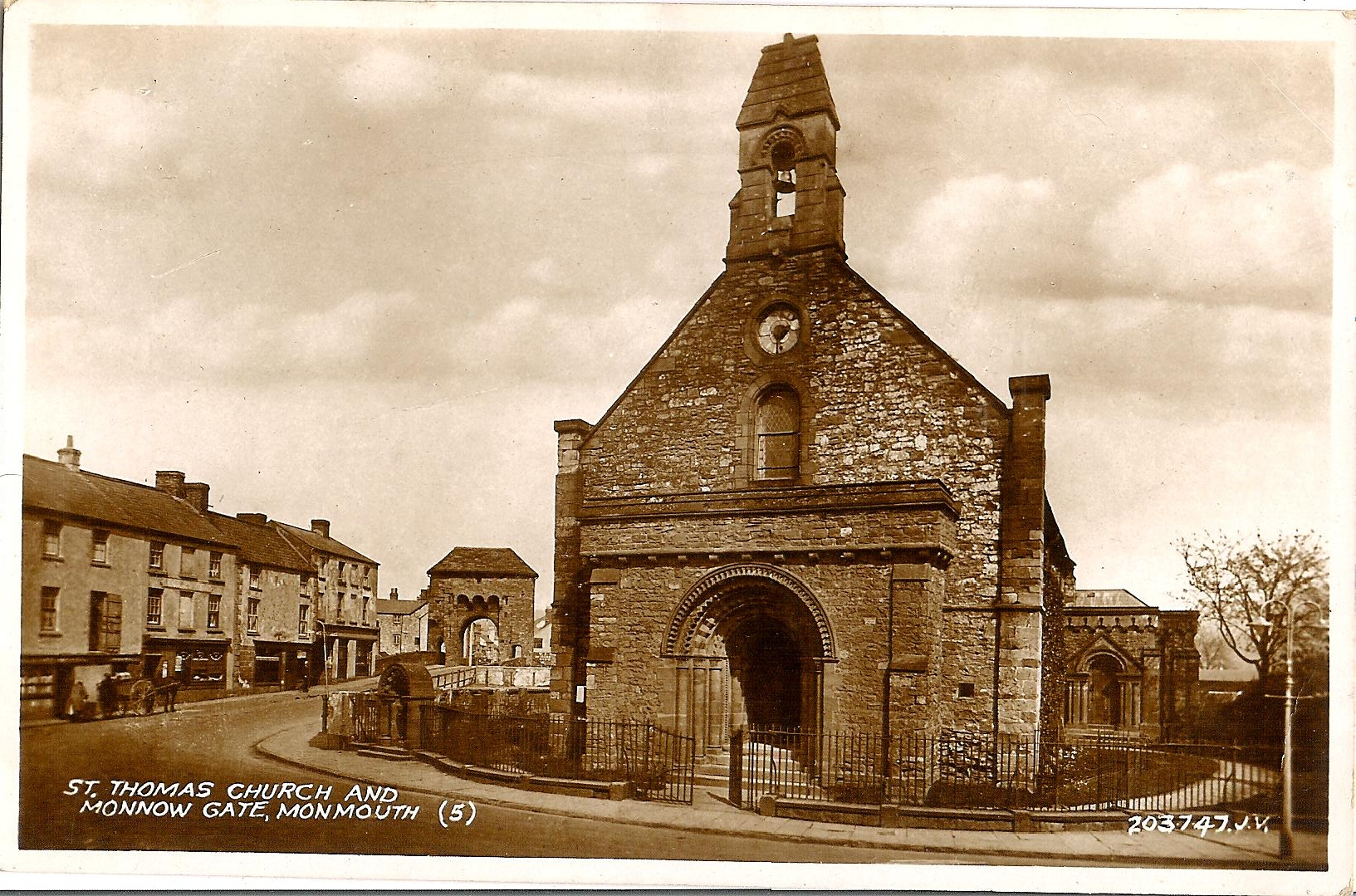
the church in 1937

=== Church interior ===
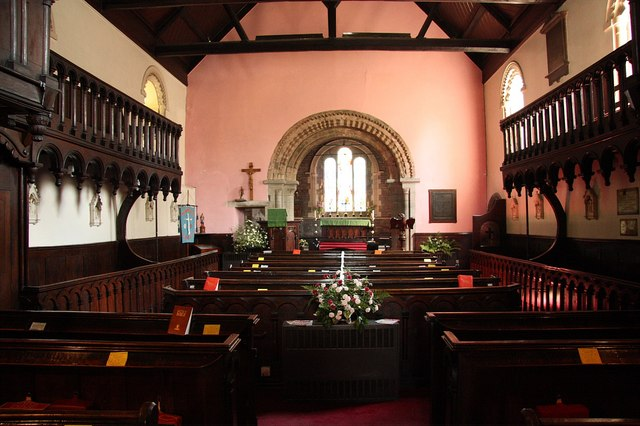
nave

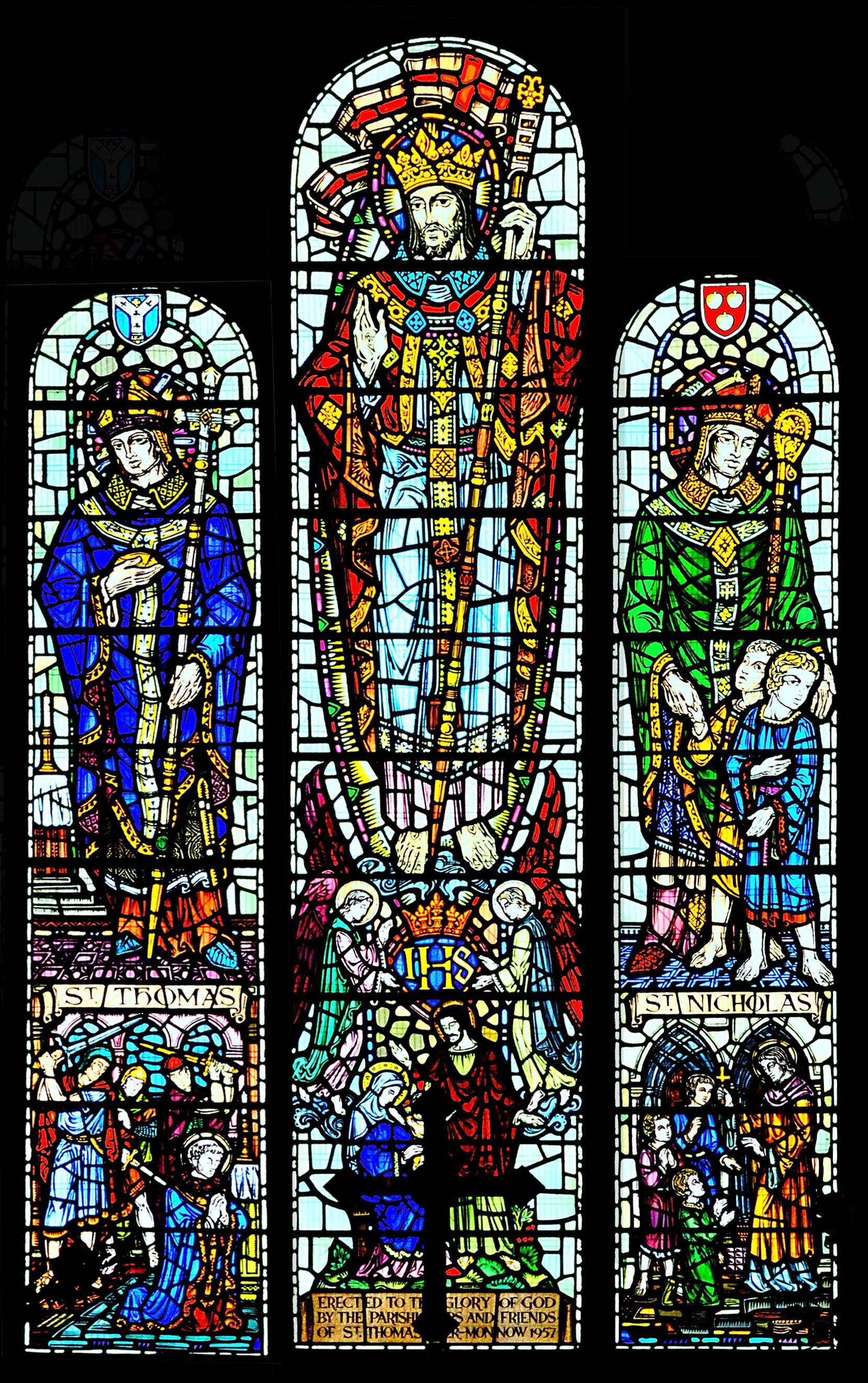
stained glass window

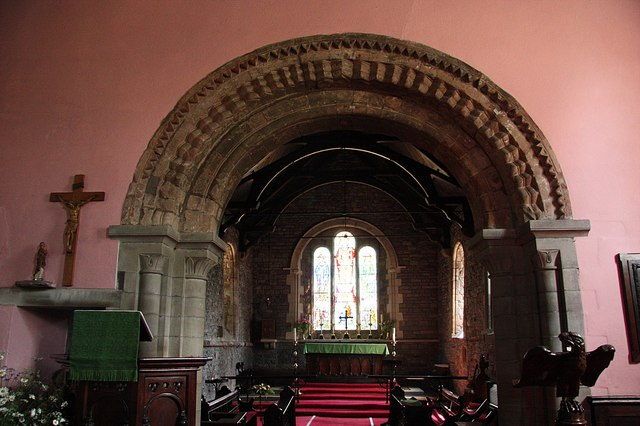
chancel arch

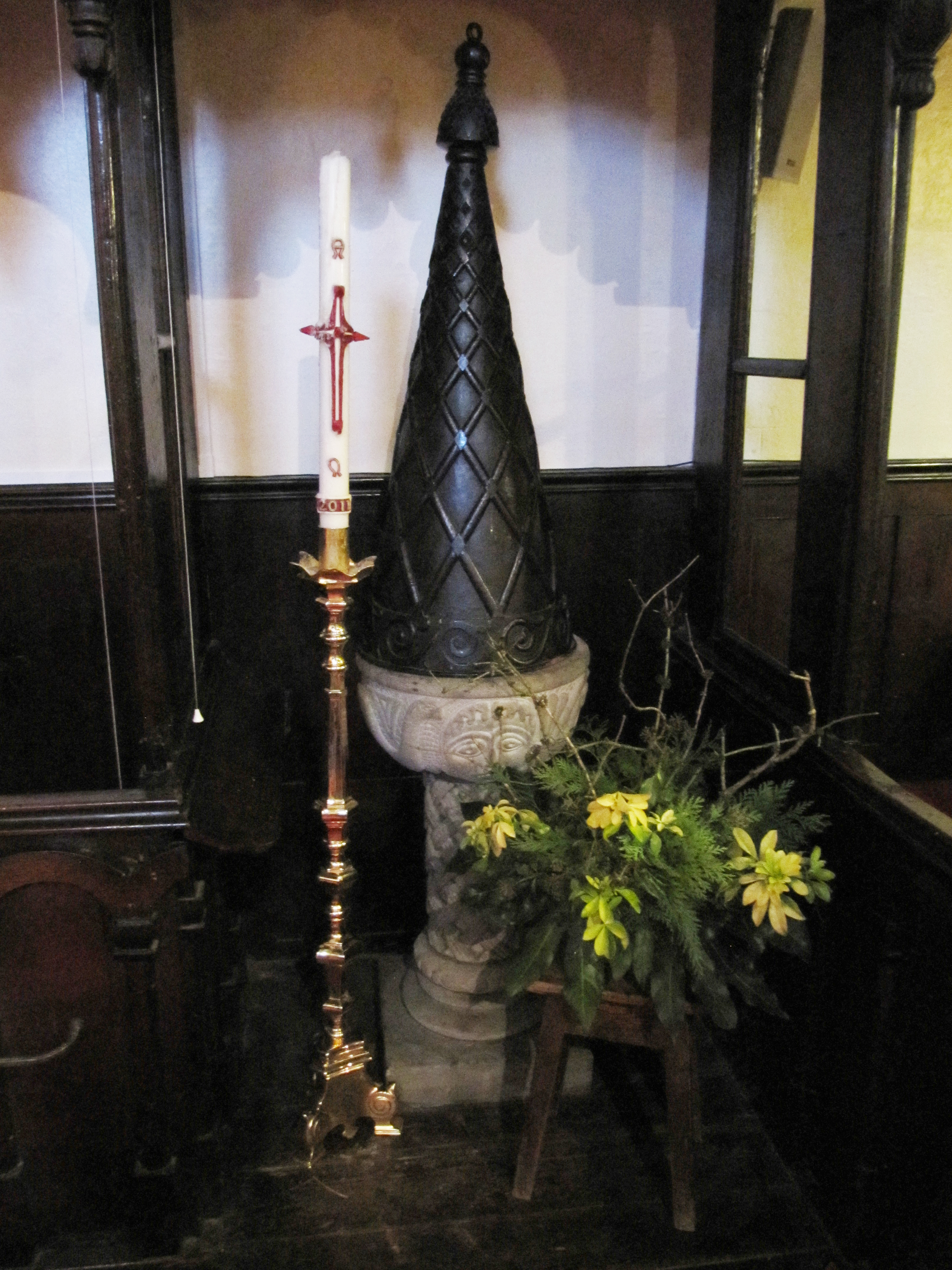
one of two church fonts

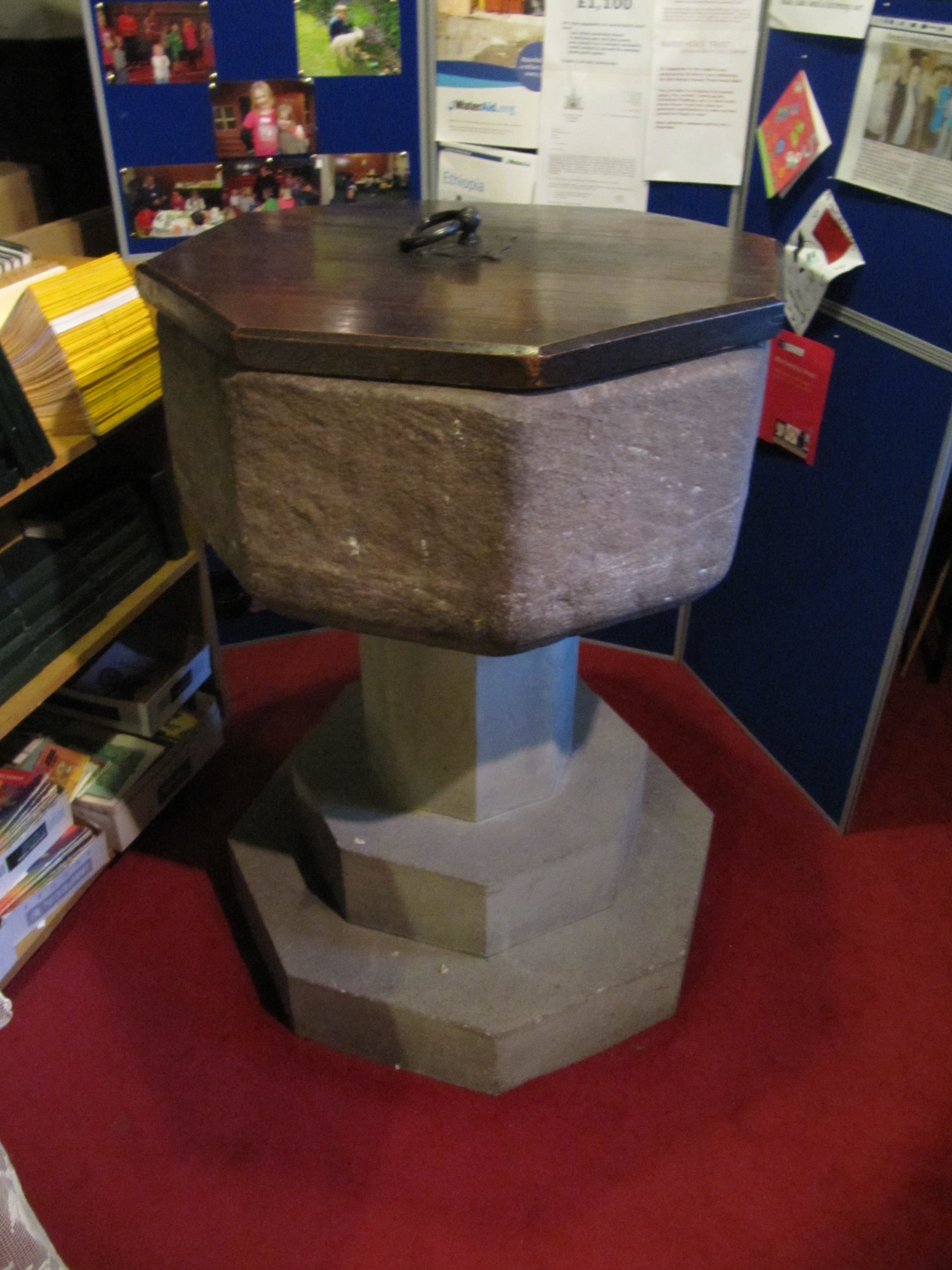
the other font

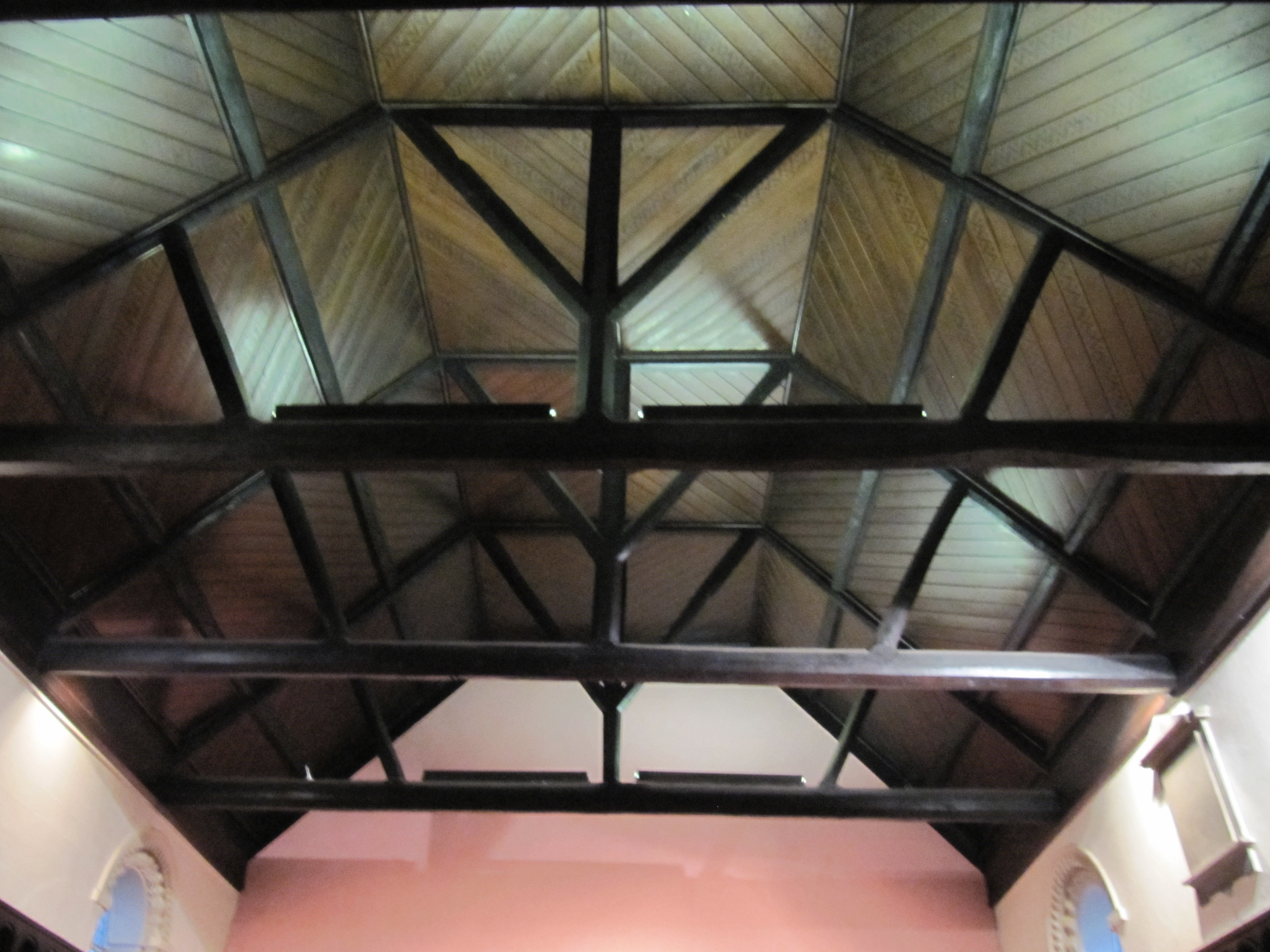
roof

=== Church exterior ===
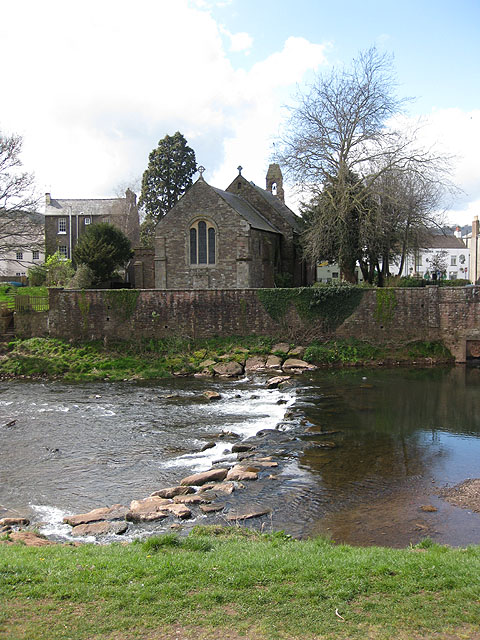
view of the church from across the River Monnow

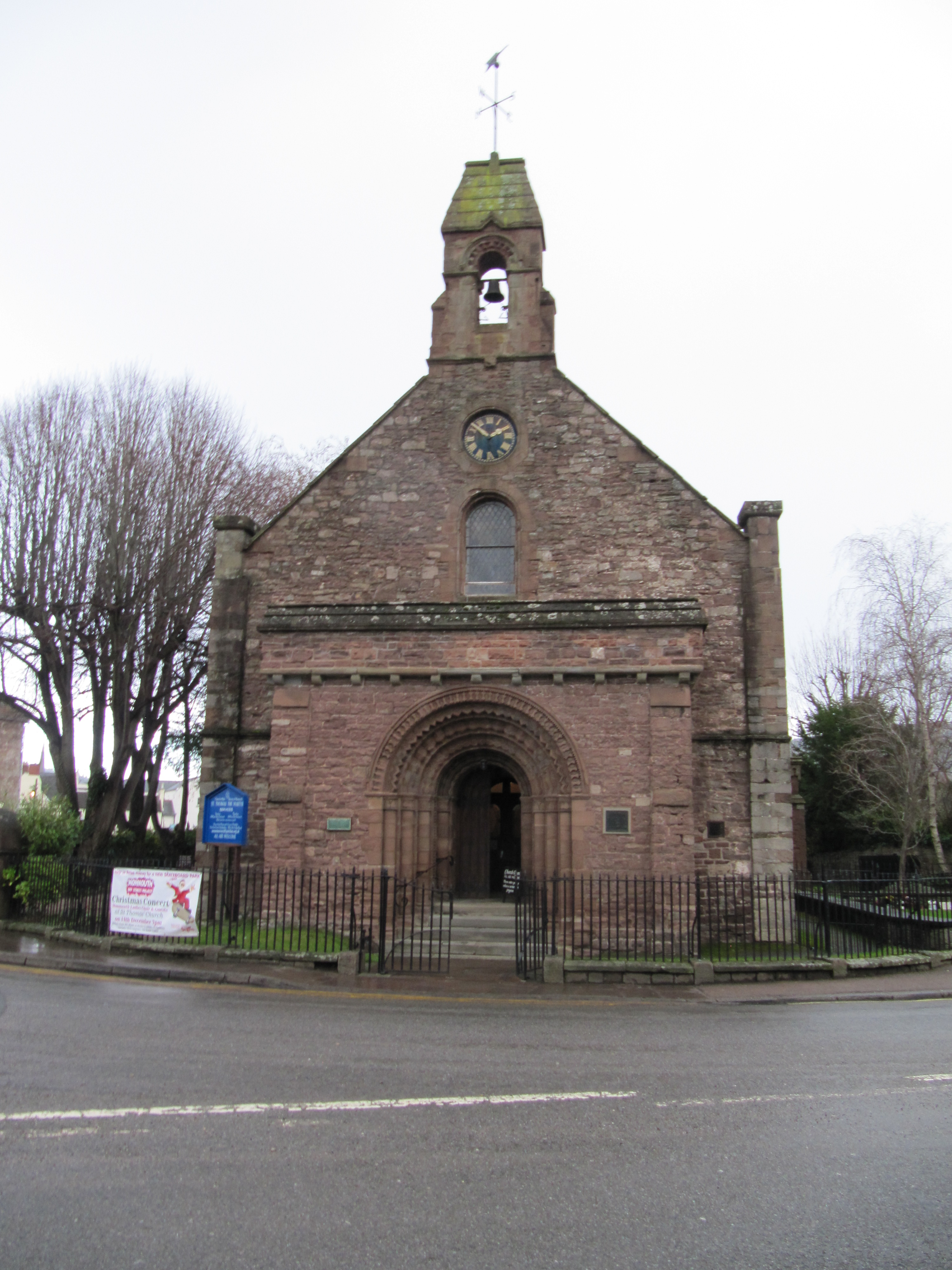
front entrance

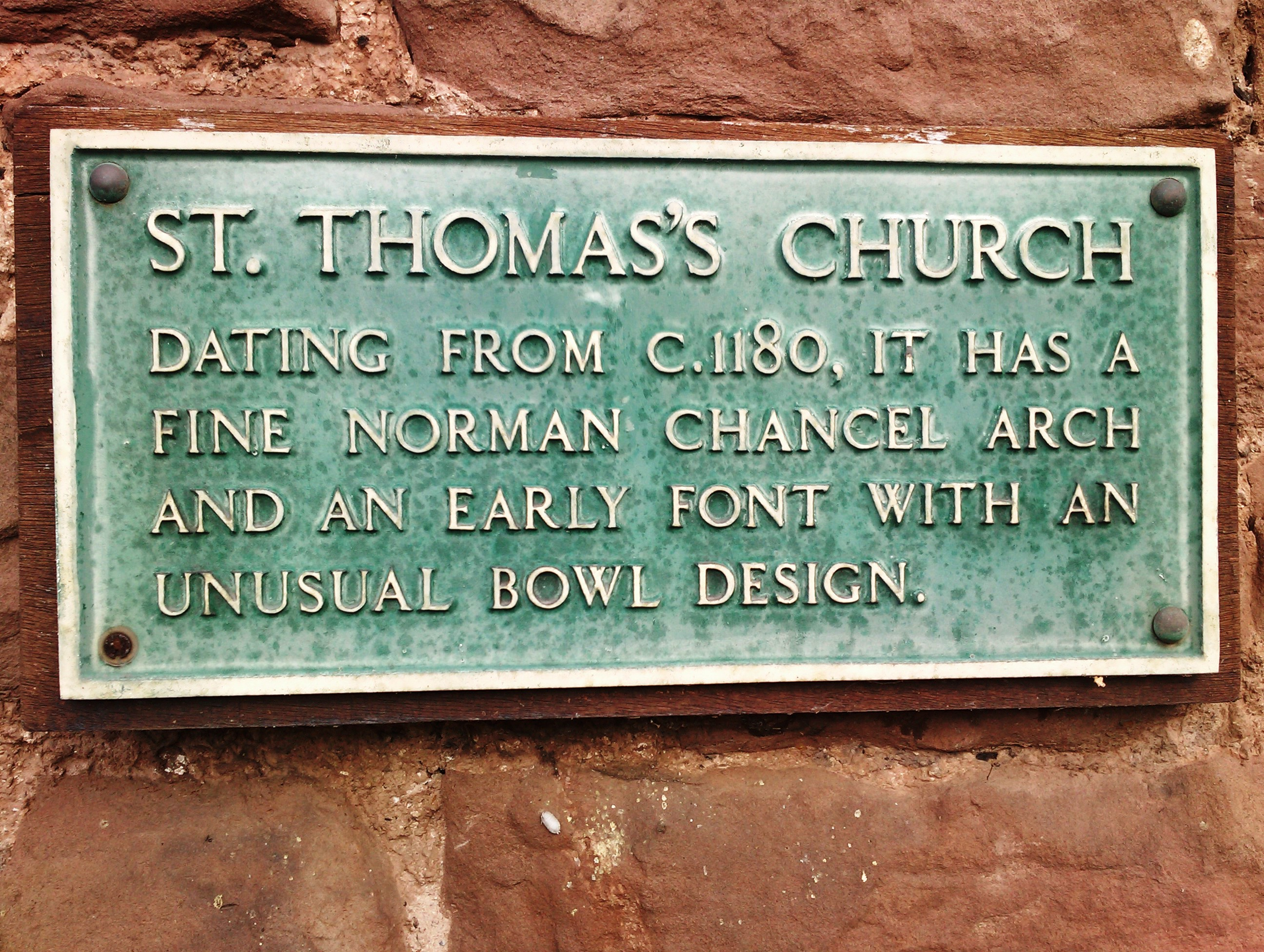
plaque

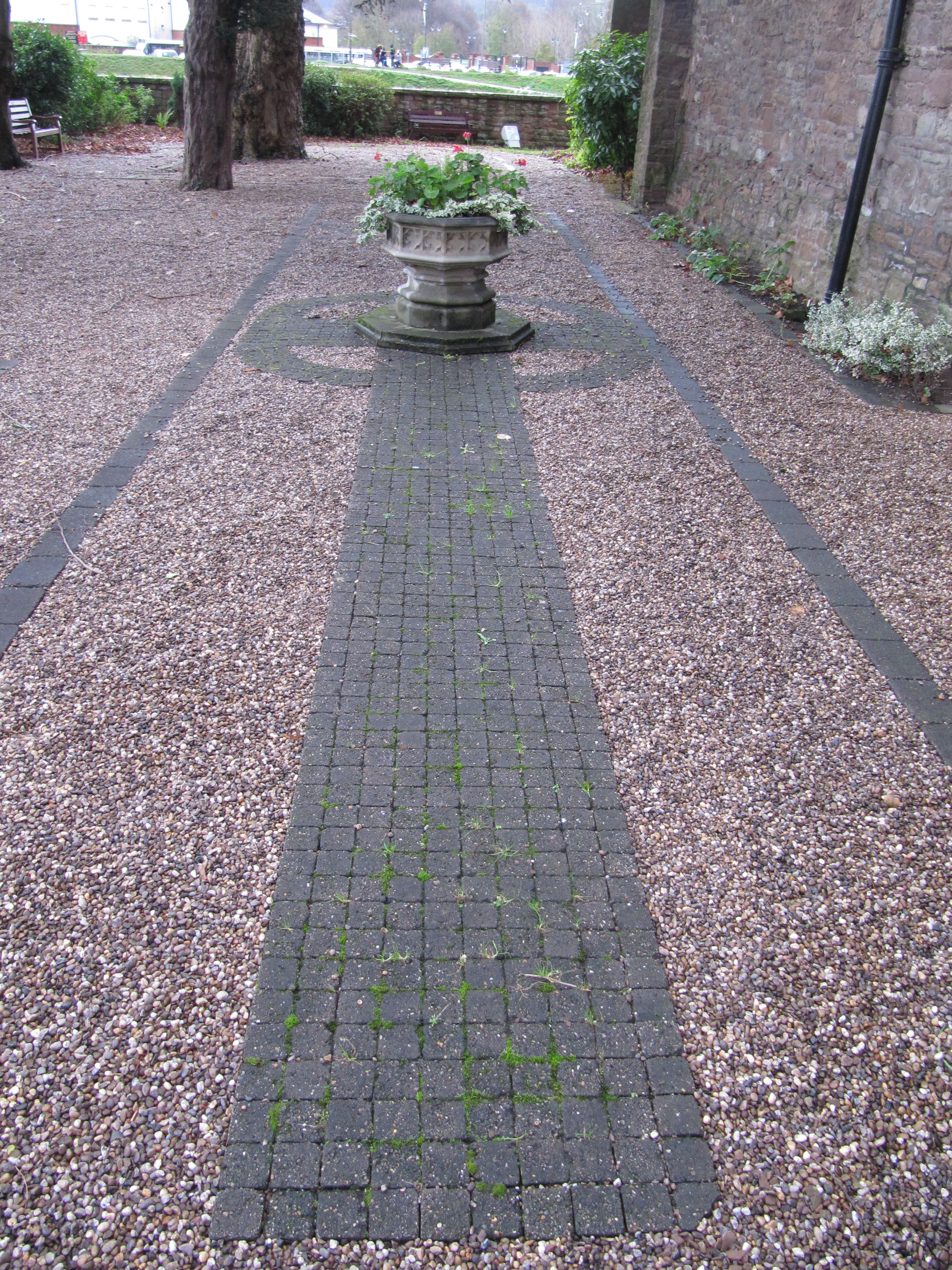
Celtic cross stone sett detail in the garden designed by Cheryl Cummings MSGD (RHS Medal winner)

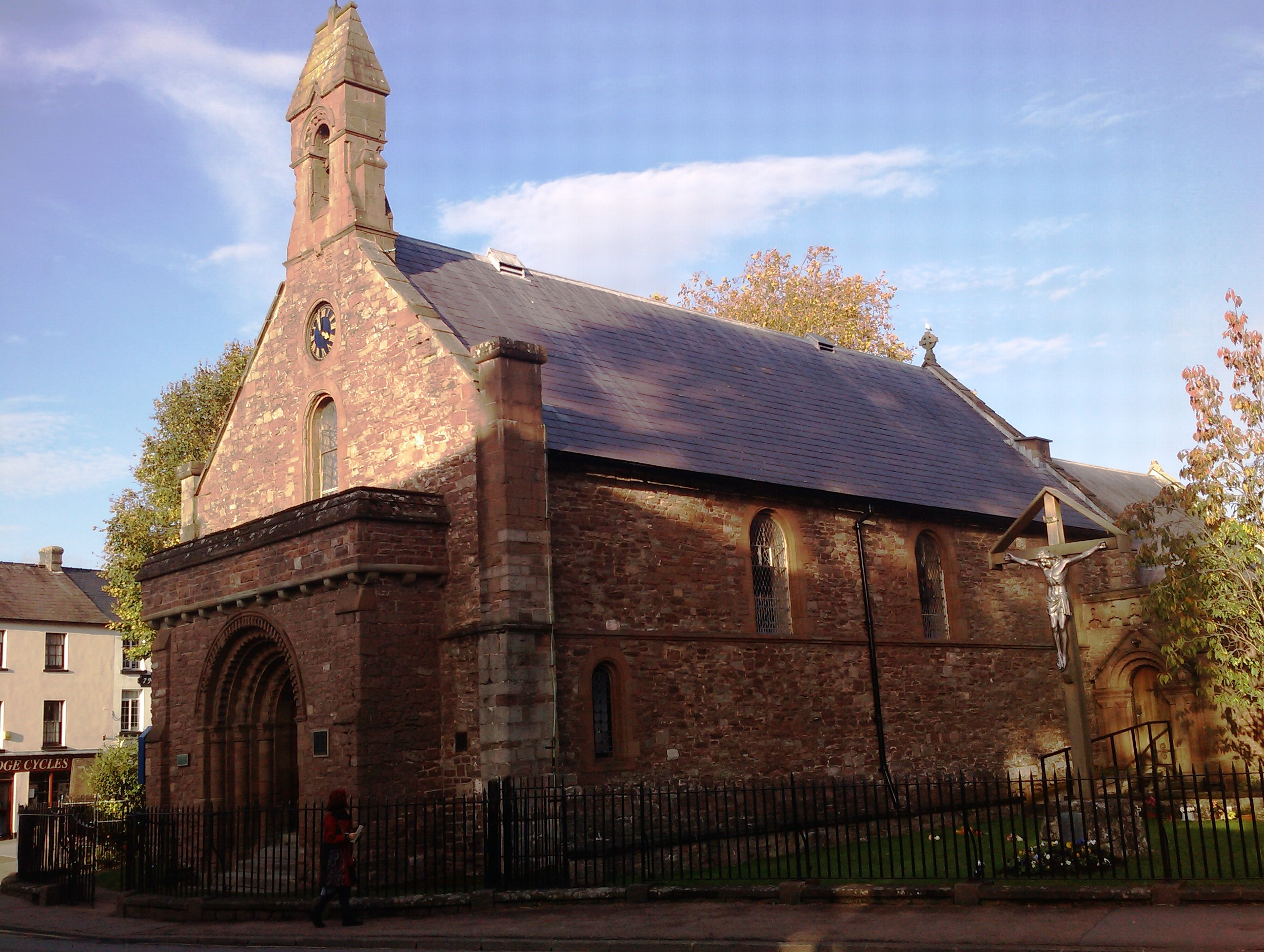
cross and second entrance

== Sources ==
- Davies, E. T. (1977). A Guide to the Ancient Churches of Gwent. Pontypool: The Griffin Press. ISBN 978-0-9500-4908-3. OCLC 60114499.
- Guy, John; Smith, Ewart (1979). Ancient Gwent Churches. Newport: The Starling Press. ISBN 978-0-9034-3436-2. OCLC 877632592.
- Kissack, Keith (1996). The Lordship, Parish and Borough of Monmouth. Hereford: Lapridge Publications. ISBN 978-1-899290-03-1. OCLC 59587626.
- — (2003). Monmouth and its Buildings. Woonton Almeley, Herefordshire: Logaston Press. ISBN 978-1-904396-01-7. OCLC 896155791.
- Newman, John (2000). Gwent/Monmouthshire. The Buildings of Wales. London: Penguin. ISBN 0-14-071053-1.
