= Drybridge House, Monmouth =

Former house, now a community centre, in Monmouth, Wales

Drybridge House
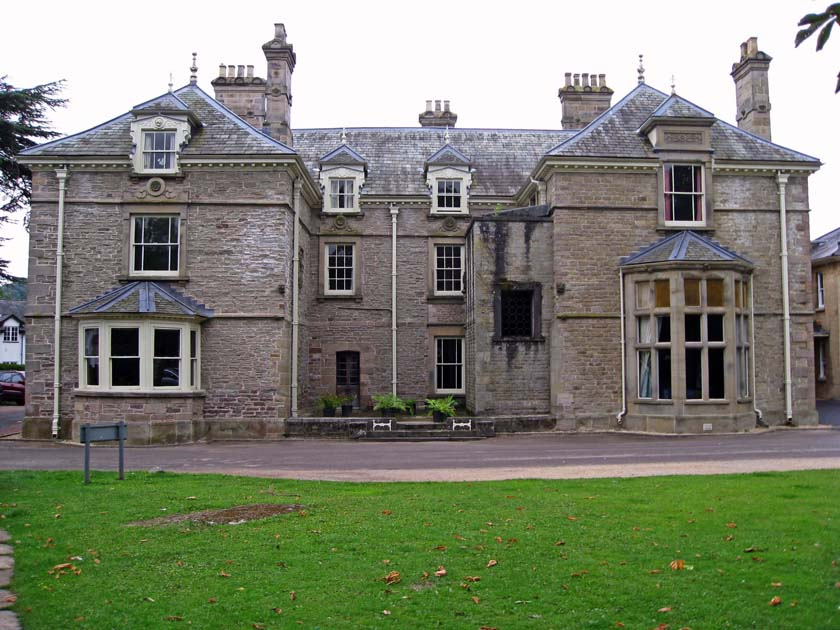
- Drybridge House, Monmouth
- Interactive map of the Drybridge House area

General information
- Location: Monmouth, Wales
- Coordinates: 51°48′34.19″N 2°43′23.88″W
- Completed: 1671

Design and construction
- Designations: Grade II* listed

Website
- drybridge-house.co.uk

Drybridge House is a large 17th-century Grade II* listed building in Monmouth, south east Wales. It is located to the southwest of the town at one end of Drybridge Street, close to the “dry bridge” over a small stream, which is now buried beneath a nearby roundabout. It is one of 24 buildings on the Monmouth Heritage Trail, and is now managed as the Bridges Centre.

== History and architecture ==
The first house on this site was built for John Roberts before 1558 and was probably a large black and white gabled farmhouse. The present house was rebuilt in 1671 by William Roberts of Monmouth, whilst serving as Receiver and Paymaster of the King's Works at Windsor Castle. Parts of its surrounding land and outbuildings were sold off in 1840. A descendant of William Roberts, Charles Henry Crompton-Roberts, was responsible for restoring and enlarging the house, and adding a new south wing, in 1867. Crompton-Roberts was High Sheriff of Monmouthshire in 1877, and later M.P. for Sandwich.

The house was owned for 400 years by the Roberts (and Crompton-Roberts) family, who took an active interest in supporting the people and organisations in the town. It has reception rooms with fine plasterwork ceilings, woodcarvings, and specially commissioned grisaille roundels of the Arthurian Legend in the bay windows. The 1867 porch masks a 1671 datestone beneath its pediment. The current house's magnificent interiors still contain items from William Roberts' building, such as the studded door of the tea room, parts of the oak panelling and staircase, and some of the carved fireplaces and Delft-tiled surrounds. Portraits of Charles Crompton-Roberts and his wife Mary can be found in the gallery.

Charles Crompton-Roberts was interested in horticulture and sport and designed a parkland garden with an exceptional collection of trees and a cricket pitch, upon which W. G. Grace and his brother played in a team against a Monmouthshire side. The pitch has now gone but many of the trees still survive. The family also added many carvings to the exterior walls, including portraits of their three eldest children, Henry Roger, Violet Mary and Charles Montagu. A frequent visitor to the house at that time was the composer Edward Elgar, who conducted and composed for local musical organisations, and gave violin and piano lessons. One of his pupils was Alice Roberts, a cousin of the family, whom he later married.

Drybridge House eventually passed to Richard Crompton Roberts, who was killed in action during the retreat from Dunkirk in 1940, and then to his sister Mary. After she married John Callender, she sold the house in 1947 to Monmouthshire County Council, with the caveat that it be used for the benefit of local people. It was then used as a welfare home for the elderly, and an extension was built in 1951. However, the home was closed suddenly in 1989, and - apart from a few months as a temporary police station - was left empty and deteriorating, despite its designation in 1991 as a Grade II* listed building and local protests against its abandonment. In 1998 the Bridges charity, based at the time in another building in Monmouth, won an agreement to develop Drybridge House as a community centre, and major fundraising began. With further grants, and the assistance of Cadw and the Heritage Lottery Fund, work took place on the refurbishment and restoration of the building, much of it involving volunteers from the local community. All the rooms were eventually opened for public use by the end of 2003.

== See also ==
- Drybridge (Monmouth ward)
