= Monnow Bridge =

Grade I listed building and bridge in Monmouth, south-east Wales

Monnow Bridge Pont Trefynwy Bridge in Wales
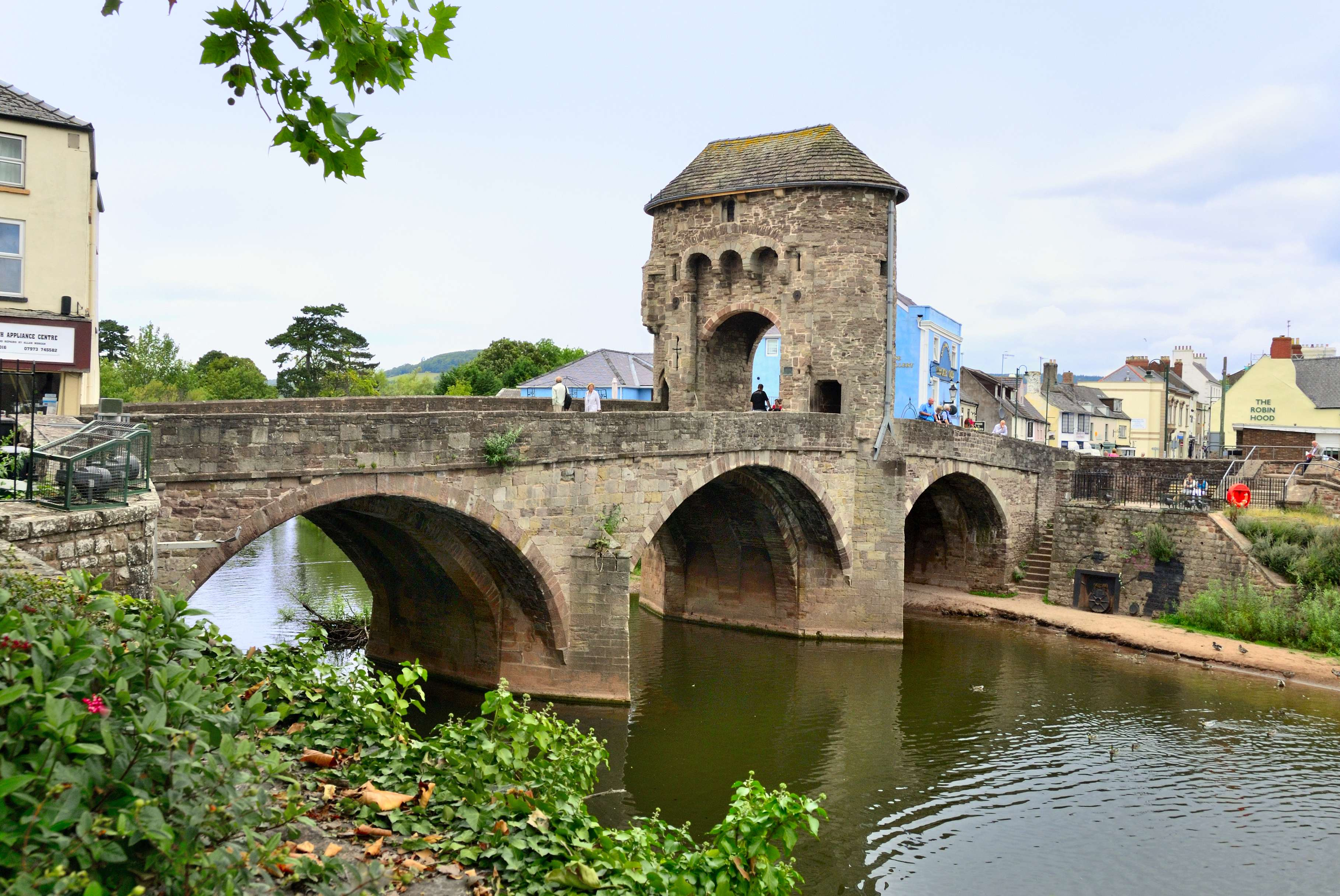
- View of the bridge looking north
- Coordinates: 51.8090°N 2.7200°W
- Carries: Pedestrian traffic
- Crosses: River Monnow
- Locale: Monmouth, Monmouthshire, Wales

Characteristics
- Design: Bridge tower
- Material: Old Red Sandstone
- Total length: 34.80 m (114.2 ft)
- Width: 7.30 m (24.0 ft)
- No. of spans: 3
- Piers in water: 2

History
- Construction start: c. 1272

Listed Building – Grade I
- Official name: Monnow Bridge and Gateway
- Designated: 15 August 1974
- Reference no.: 2218

Scheduled monument
- Official name: Monnow Bridge
- Designated: 24 July 1974
- Reference no.: MM008

Location
- Interactive map of Monnow Bridge

Monnow Bridge (Welsh: Pont Trefynwy Welsh pronunciation: [pɔnt tre:vənʊɨ]), in Monmouth, Wales, is the only remaining fortified river bridge in Great Britain with its gate tower standing on the bridge. Such bridge towers were common across Europe from medieval times, but many were destroyed due to urban expansion, diminishing defensive requirements and the increasing demands of traffic and trade. The historical and architectural importance of the bridge and its rarity are reflected in its status as a scheduled monument and a Grade I listed building. The bridge crosses the River Monnow (Afon Mynwy) 500 metres (1,600 ft) above its confluence with the River Wye.

Monmouth had been a significant border settlement since the Roman occupation of Britain, when it was the site of the fort of Blestium. The River Wye may have been bridged at this time but the Monnow, being easily fordable, appears not to have had a crossing until after the Norman Conquest. According to the local tradition, construction of Monnow Bridge began in 1272 to replace a 12th-century Norman timber bridge. Through the medieval era, the English Civil War, and the Chartist uprising, the bridge played a significant, if ineffectual, role in defending Monmouth. It also served as a gaol, a munitions store, a lodge, an advertising hoarding, a focus for celebrations and, most significantly, as a toll gate. Much of the medieval development of Monmouth was funded by the taxes and tolls the borough was entitled to raise through royal charter. The tolls were collected through control of the points of entry to the town, including the gatehouse on Monnow Bridge.

Built predominantly of Old Red Sandstone, the bridge was the subject of significant reconstruction and rebuilding in the 18th and 19th centuries. In those centuries, it also became a popular subject for artists; Turner, Gastineau and Cotman produced sketches of the bridge and gate. In the 20th century, it suffered increasing damage as higher volumes of traffic and the use of ever-larger vehicles led to several serious accidents. In the 21st century, the construction of a new road crossing to the south enabled the pedestrianisation of the bridge.

== History ==
=== Earliest history ===
Monmouth was a significant settlement in Roman Britain, as the border fort of Blestium and as an important centre for ironworking. It is possible the Romans bridged the River Wye during their occupation, but the Monnow appears not to have had a crossing until after the Norman invasion. The Norman lord William FitzOsbern built a castle near the confluence of the two rivers in around 1070. The following two centuries saw the establishment of the Benedictine Priory and the development of the town as a defensive location on the Welsh Marches.

=== 12th–14th centuries ===
The original bridge over the Monnow at Monmouth was constructed of wood in the mid-12th century. In 1988, work on flood defences revealed remains of the wooden bridge directly under the existing one, and dendrochronological analysis indicated that its timber came from trees felled between 1123 and 1169. (Note: John R. Kenyon, in his study The Medieval Castles of Wales, gives a slightly later date of the 1170s.) An early account in the Flores Historiarum by Roger of Wendover may indicate that the wooden bridge and the nearby Church of St Thomas the Martyr were damaged by fire in the Battle of Monmouth in 1233, fought between supporters of Henry III and the forces of Richard Marshal, Earl of Pembroke. Both the site of the battle and the specific bridge involved are debated—the local historian Keith Kissack argued that the battle was fought on Vauxhall Fields, below Monmouth Castle and some way from Monnow Bridge, while other modern historians continue to place the battle at Overmonnow.

The stone bridge was completed in the late 13th century. It was traditionally thought to have been built in 1272, though this date has no supporting documentary evidence. (Note: M. L. J. Rowlands notes that the earliest historical claim for the date 1272 appears in the volume Castles and Abbeys of England, by the Victorian antiquarian William Beattie. Beattie "states categorically that the bridge was erected by Edward I in 1272 (but) provides no specific reference for this information".) The historian William Coxe incorrectly described the bridge as pre-dating the Norman Conquest and recorded that "it commanded the passage of the Monnow and was a barrier against the Welsh". In 1804, the Monmouth antiquarian Charles Heath wrote that the bridge's "foundation is so ancient that neither history or tradition afford any light respecting the date of its erection". Heath drew directly from The Antiquities of England and Wales, an earlier guide by Francis Grose, published in 1773. The archaeologist Martin Cook notes the significance of the date 1270 as the start of a period that saw increased bridge-building, as a result of the rapid growth of international trade. (Note: David Harrison argues, contrary to earlier views, that the Anglo-Saxon and Medieval periods saw very significant bridge-building activity, resulting in there being "almost as many bridges in 1250 as there were in 1750".) The civil engineer Edwyn Jervoise suggested that the absence of an evidential record was due to the destruction of the archives of the Duke of Beaufort at Raglan Castle in the 17th century. This is unlikely, as the gatehouse did not come into the possession of the duke's family, the Somersets, until the 19th century. (Note: The plaque affixed to the gatehouse in 1900, recording the gift of the gate from the Duke of Beaufort to Monmouthshire County Council, "has led many to the erroneous conclusion that the Dukes of Beaufort had some ancient claim on the monument. However, Monnow Gate was directly associated with that family only from 1830 until 1900".)

The gatehouse, called Monnow Gate, which gives Monnow Bridge its now unique appearance, was added at the end of the 13th or start of the 14th centuries, twenty-five to thirty years after the bridge itself was built. The siting of the gatehouse mid-channel is relatively unusual; the archaeologist David Harrison notes the more common arrangement was for the gate to be situated on the roadway at one end of the bridge. In 1297, Edward I provided a murage grant in favour of Monmouth in response to a request from his nephew, Henry of Lancaster. A murage was a medieval tax, granted specifically to allow for the raising of funds to construct or repair town walls. (Note: Fred Hando records in his 1964 volume Here and There in Monmouthshire, "Murage was a tax for keeping walls in repair; pontage for repairing a bridge; pavage for paving of streets; lastage was a duty paid for a ship-freight, stallage the right to erect stalls at fairs; tronage a toll for weighing wool; keyage was payment for use of a quay; landage was land tax.") The grant allowed the townspeople to build the town walls and gates, including the construction of the gatehouse. By 1315, work was incomplete or required repair, as the original authority was renewed on 1 June of that year. At that time, the bridge would have been much narrower than now, with all traffic passing beneath a single arch. The arch was protected by a portcullis, whose associated grooves are still visible. The prominent arched machicolations, defensive apertures through which stones or other material could be dropped on attackers, were added at an unknown date in the medieval period, possibly in the late 14th century. The gate formed part of the town's defensive walls. The cartographer John Speed's map of 1610 shows walls only on the northern side of the town, which lies unprotected by either the Monnow or the Wye, but the archaeologist Ian Soulsby suggests it is "inconceivable" that Monnow Gate, and another gate shown by Speed leading out onto Chippenham Mead, stood alone.

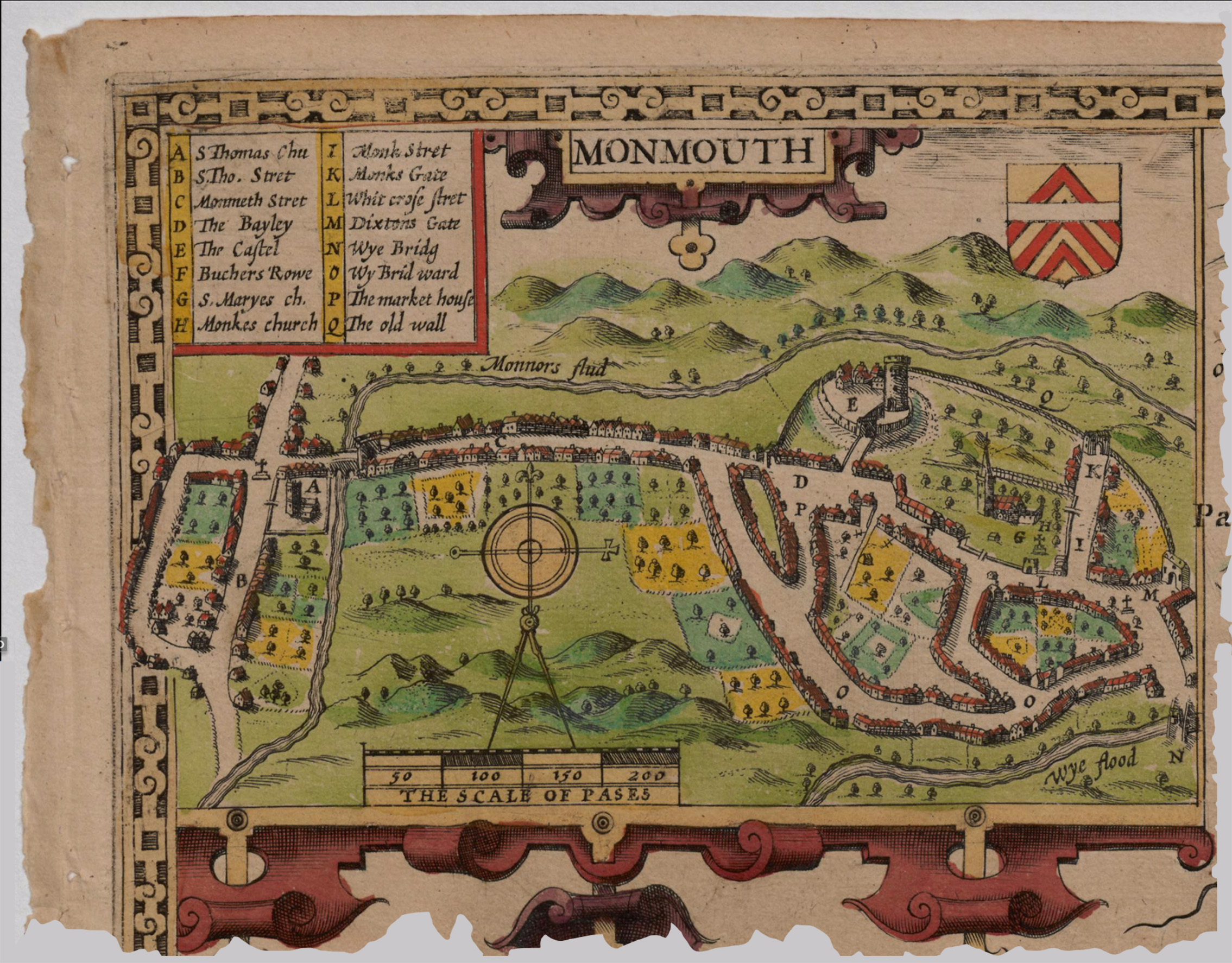
John Speed's 1610 map showing Monmouth's fortifications, with Monnow Bridge and Gate between A and C

As well as its defensive role, the gatehouse served as a barrier to allow for the collection of tolls from those attending markets. Tolls were authorised in the Patent Rolls of 1297 and 1315 and in subsequent town charters. Kissack gives details of the wide variety of items on which tariffs were levied in his reproduction of the charter of 1297. These included "five fat hogs, (a) horse-load of honey and a thousand (roofing) nails". In 1447 Henry VI granted the town a Charter of Incorporation which enabled further development.

Historians have debated whether defence or revenue collection was the gatehouse's primary purpose. The Victorian antiquarian Mary Ellen Bagnall-Oakeley, who wrote the first history of the bridge and gate in 1902, described the gatehouse as "a little fortress complete in itself, though of course, useless in time of war". Her account contended that the "tower was not in any way connected with the fortification walls of the town" and that the gatehouse was erected solely "for the purpose of taking tolls". The Monmouthshire antiquarian Joseph Bradney, in the first volume of his A History of Monmouthshire from the Coming of the Normans into Wales down to the Present Time, concurred; "the bridge is a curious structure which appears to have been more for the purpose of collecting tolls than anything else, though as a defence to the town outside the walls it might be of some help". Kissack follows their arguments, noting that the gatehouse was ineffective in defensive terms, as the Monnow could easily be crossed on foot upstream. More recent commentators disagree; Soulsby considered the bridge to have a clear defensive purpose, and Michael Rowlands, author of the most recent history of the bridge and gatehouse, argued that the bridge and gatehouse met the dual aims of defensive protection and the collection of tolls.

=== 15th–19th centuries ===
Neither Monmouth nor its castle were attacked in the rebellion of Owain Glyndŵr between 1400 and 1415, although nearby Abergavenny and Grosmont were burned down in the uprising. The unrest of the period had a negative impact on the development of the town. But the bridge continued its important function as a toll-gate. Philip Jones, Member of Parliament for Monmouth Boroughs in 1589, bequeathed an annual sum of about £120, the rent from his lands and houses at 'Bayliepitte', to the mayor and bailiffs of Monmouth on condition that the borough exempt those people passing through the gate or coming into Monmouth with cattle from paying tolls on fair days.

In the 16th century, the antiquarian John Leland described the bridge in one of his Itineraries: "From Monk's Gate the wall extends Westwards to the river Monnow. In the wall are four gates: Monk's Gate, East Gate and Wye Gate ... and Monnow Gate which is above the bridge crossing the river Monnow." A visual depiction of the bridge and gate is included in John Speed's work The Theatre of the Empire of Great Britain, published in 1611. His map of Monmouthshire includes an inset map of the town that shows the Monnow Bridge and Gate as well as a similar gatehouse on the Wye Bridge. (Note: Speed's map appears as a cartouche in the top left hand corner of his larger map of the county. It includes a scale of pases (paces). Speed recorded that the presence of such a scale indicated that he had personally visited, and measured, a site. This was not always the case: he freely acknowledged his frequent plagiarism from early sources, "I have put my sickle into other men's corn".)

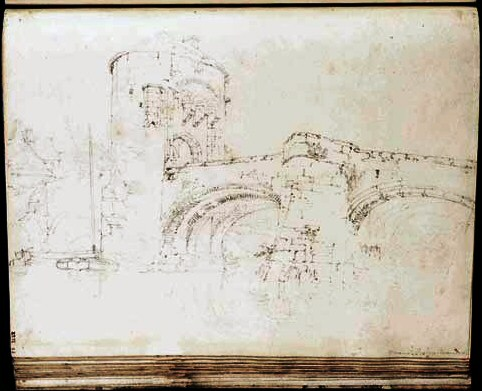
Sketch by J. M. W. Turner, 1795

In the English Civil War, the town changed hands several times, and in 1645 the bridge was seized by Royalist soldiers from Raglan in a failed attempt to retake the town from the Parliamentarian forces under Colonel Kyrle. Kissack describes the engagement as "the most resolute Royalist attack made (on) Monmouth", which saw eight of Kyrle's opponents killed and five captured. By 1705, the bridge and gatehouse required maintenance: the original battlements were replaced with solid walls, and the building was refitted to form a two-storey dwelling house with timber and lath extensions projecting over the river. The house was then leased to a resident gatekeeper, responsible for repairing and maintaining the building. Part of the gatehouse remained in use as a lock-up. Such multiple uses were not uncommon; the archaeologist C. J. Bond recorded that "gates often included chambers which could be used for lock-ups, chapels or meeting rooms". Both the bridge and the gatehouse were again repaired between 1771 and 1775. The bill for repairs included the cost of 100 gallons of ale for the workmen employed. Trade continued to be central to the importance of the bridge. The Monmouthshire writer and artist Fred Hando records that, on a single Saturday in the early 18th century, "500 horses each carrying five bushels of corn entered by way of the Monnow gate".

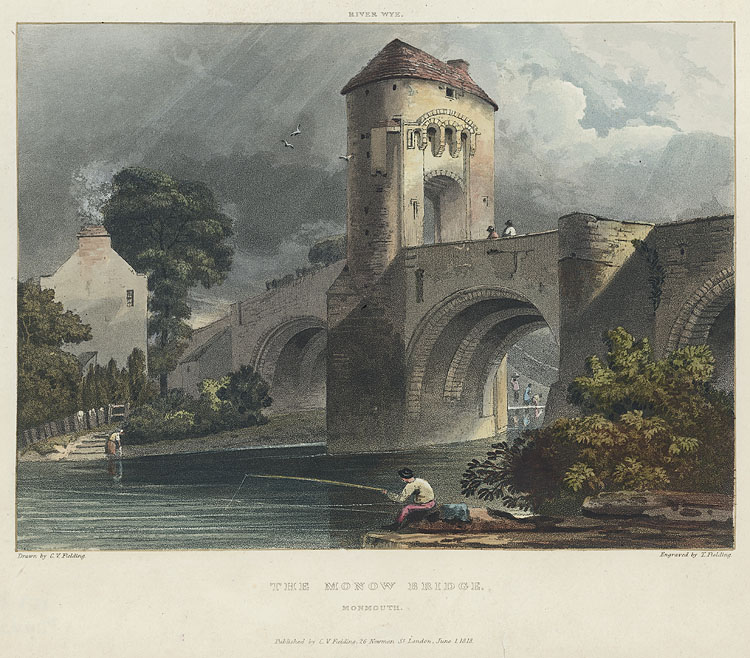
The bridge and gatehouse in 1818, drawn by Copley Fielding

In 1804, Charles Heath recorded, "The interior has nothing worthy of attention and the only purpose to which it is employed is an occasional guardhouse, or powder room, for the military, when stationed at Monmouth." The gatehouse had by this point been abandoned as a dwelling. The lean-to extensions, including the guardhouse, were demolished around 1815. In 1819, a pedestrian passageway was driven through the building on the upstream side to help relieve the flow of traffic across the bridge. Before 1830, the gatehouse was owned by Monmouth Corporation, and subsequently the County Council, as inheritors of the medieval burgesses. In a lengthy transaction, begun that year but not concluded until 1835, ownership was formally transferred to the Duke of Beaufort as part of a property exchange. The gatehouse roof was reconstructed in 1832, with deeper eaves and four decorative corbels on each side. A second passageway was added on the downstream side of the arch in 1845. Since then, the structure has remained essentially unchanged, save for periodic maintenance and repair.

In 1839, at the time of the Newport Rising, the gatehouse was garrisoned as the authorities feared a Chartist attack on Monmouth. Later guidebooks suggest that the three loopholes visible on the tower were opened up at this time "for musketry in anticipation of the advance of the Chartists", but Rowlands shows that the apertures are visible in illustrations of the gatehouse long before 1839.

The gatehouse was the scene of annual battles, or "muntlings", between rival gangs from "Up-Town" – the main town of Monmouth – and Overmonnow or "Cappers' Town", so called because it was the traditional home of those who made Monmouth caps. Until the confrontations were banned in 1858, youths from both sides of the bridge would gather for these occasions on 1 and 29 May, armed with besoms or "muntles" reinforced with stones. The bridge was also used as an unofficial advertising hoarding and as a focus for significant local and national celebrations. In 1891, it was decorated with flags and lights to commemorate the coming of age of John Maclean Rolls, eldest son of Monmouthshire grandee Lord Llangattock.

=== 20th–21st centuries ===
From 1889 to 1902, an extensive programme of conservation was carried out on the bridge and gate, directed by Monmouthshire County Council, which retained responsibility for maintenance. This began with the prevention of the potential collapse of the gatehouse by the insertion of metal tie rods to hold the two faces of the tower together; the four round plates at the ends of these two rods can still be seen. In 1892, conservation work began on the arches and piers of the bridge following the discovery that riverbed erosion had seriously undermined the piers. Maintenance was carried out on the gatehouse exterior from the mid-1890s to 1897. Roof guttering and downpipes were added, badly eroded stone was replaced with squared blocks of Old Red Sandstone, and the cruciform arrowslit on the left-hand side of the west elevation of the gatehouse was restored to make it symmetrical. (Note: Martin Cook notes the design of the loopholes is "typical of the late thirteenth century and were developed from plain loops; the horizontal slits allowed an increased field of view from within".) Concluding the 1889–1902 renovations, improvements were made to the interior of the gatehouse, and it was opened to the public in 1902.

In 1900, ownership of the gatehouse was transferred from Henry Somerset, 9th Duke of Beaufort to Monmouthshire County Council as part of the disposal of the entirety of the Somersets' land holdings in Monmouthshire. The gift is recorded on a brass plaque attached to the gatehouse. The local antiquarian Mary Ellen Bagnall-Oakeley wrote the first history of the bridge and gatehouse, Monnow Bridge Tower, which appeared in 1903. (Note: Mary Ellen Bagnall-Oakeley had earlier referenced the bridge and gatehouse in her wider study The Fortifications of Monmouth, published in 1896.) In April 1893, the first street light was erected on the bridge by the town council. In the late 1920s, the top portion of this light was replaced by twin electric lamps. In the 1960s, the lamps were removed completely, and since 1991 the bridge has been floodlit.

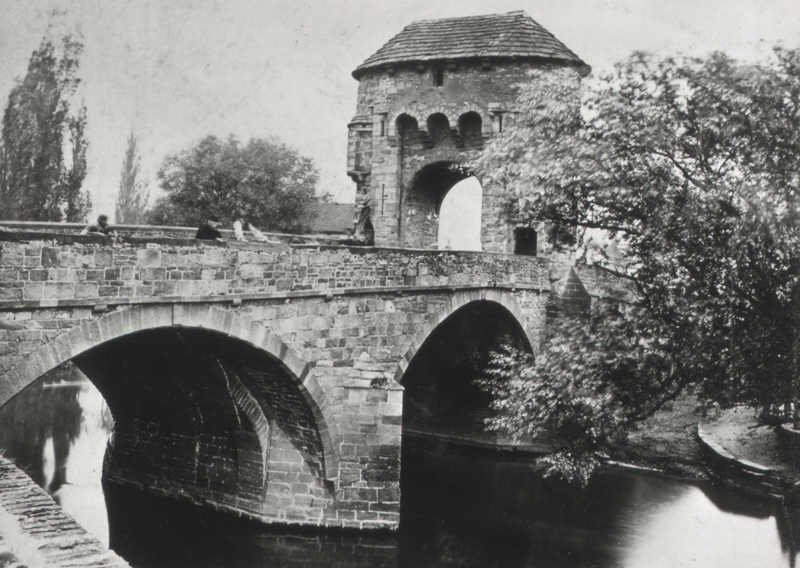
Monnow Bridge and Gatehouse, c. 1866

In 1963, Fred Hando, who recorded points of interest and history around Monmouthshire in a series of articles for the South Wales Argus between the 1920s and the 1960s, wrote a description of the gatehouse, referencing the small museum then located in the upstairs room. Hando mentions the "beautifully executed" copies of the patent rolls issued by Edward I in 1296-7 and by Edward II in 1315 which recorded the items on which tolls could be levied to fund the fortifications for Monmouth.

In the 20th century, the greater volume of traffic using the humpbacked bridge, which had poor visibility and narrow approach roads, led to a rise in accidents and an increase in bypass proposals. The desire of local authorities to clear carriageways of obstructions to traffic led to the demolition of many similar bridge towers from as early as the 18th century. The bridge and gate were formally protected as an Ancient Monument in 1923, and proposals for a new road bridge began to be made about the same time. The new A40, built during 1965–1966, relieved the town of much through traffic, and a town centre plan, prepared by the District Council in 1981, again proposed a new bridge. Repairs had to be undertaken in 1982 following a collision on 18 May in which a double-decker bus struck the bridge, resulting in its closure for a month. Damage to the bridge and gate through accidents continued, and in the early 1990s, two drivers were prosecuted after crossing the bridge with vehicles significantly exceeding the weight and height limits.

In 1999, the engineers Ove Arup and Partners undertook a feasibility study for a bridge downstream from the Monnow Bridge, but the scheme was not progressed at that time. Both the County and Town Councils remained committed to the construction of a new crossing to support the economic development of the town, and in 2003 local authority funding of £1.3 million was secured and construction commenced. The new bridge opened on 15 March 2004 for local traffic, allowing the old bridge to become pedestrianised. The closure to traffic also enabled a significant repair programme to be undertaken, in part funded by the Welsh Government and the European Union. After further conservation and repair, the gatehouse was formally re-opened in 2014, allowing public access on one day per week.

== Depictions in art ==
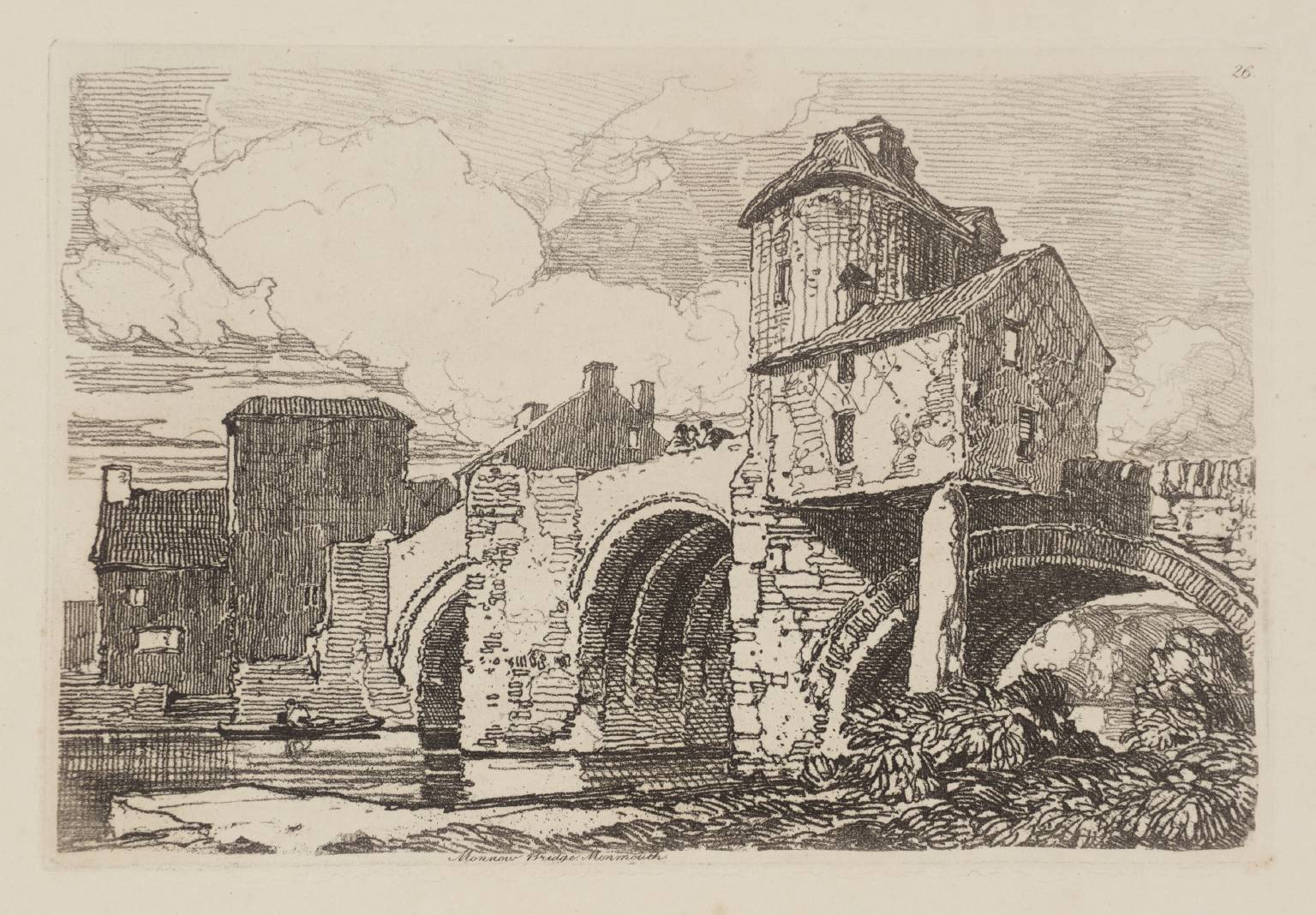
The bridge by John Sell Cotman, c. 1800

William Gilpin, in his Observations on the River Wye, and Several Parts of South Wales, etc. Relative Chiefly to Picturesque Beauty; made in the Summer of the Year 1770, published in 1782, generated considerable interest in the natural and man-made attractions of South Wales and heralded the development of the Wye Tour as an alternative to the Grand Tour. As a consequence, Monnow Bridge and gatehouse became a popular subject for artists. A late 18th-century watercolour by Michael Angelo Rooker is now in the Monmouth Museum. The noted architectural watercolourist Samuel Prout painted the bridge in a study dated "before 1814", now held at the Yale Center for British Art in Connecticut. In 1795, J. M. W. Turner sketched the bridge and gatehouse during one of his annual summer sketching tours.

The watercolourist and etcher John Sell Cotman sketched the bridge in the early 19th century, his drawing showing the overhanging accommodation and guardhouse that were later removed. Joshua Cristall produced a similar pencil sketch in 1803. Henry Gastineau drew the bridge in about 1819. Due to a printing error that confused his drawing of the bridge with one of the tower at Raglan Castle on the opposite page of the printed collection, Gastineau's image often appears with the title Gate and Bridge, Ragland. The artist of the American West Thomas Moran produced an undated pencil drawing of the bridge which is printed in his Field Sketches. A depiction of the bridge in stained glass by Charles Eamer Kempe can be seen in the Memorial of the Boer War window in St Mary's Priory Church in Monmouth.

== Architecture and appreciation ==
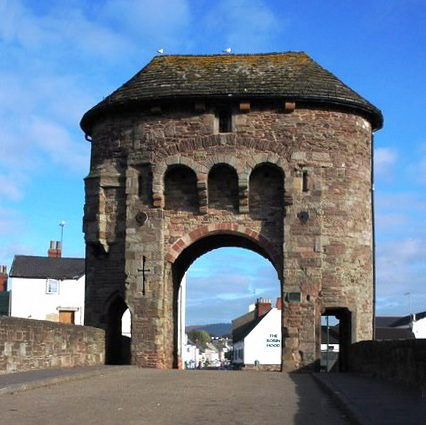
The west front of the gatehouse

The bridge is 34.8 metres (110 ft) in length and 7.3 metres (20 ft) wide. It has three arches standing on piers. The two piers that stand on the bed of the Monnow form cutwaters. The undersides of the arches are ribbed for reinforcement. The bridge is constructed of seven types of stone, predominantly Old Red Sandstone, all quarried within 16 kilometres (10 miles) of Monmouth. The gatehouse stands 11 metres (36 ft) high above the bridge deck. The two passageways through the gate are 19th-century insertions. Prior to their construction, the main gateway was the sole means of entry and egress. This opening was defended by a portcullis. The gatehouse is elliptical, and its western and eastern elevations show considerable differences. The western front has three machicolations over the gate with murder holes inset. The historians Oliver Creighton and Richard Higham note their "fine architectural detailing". The dating of the machicolations is uncertain, but comparison with similar, dated, examples, such as those at Cooling Castle in Kent, suggests a construction period in the 14th century. They cannot be original to the gate, as their positioning would have obstructed the portcullis. The eastern front is less decorated and displays evidence of more substantial reconstruction. It has a centrally placed round-headed window. The pedestrian arches through the bridge also differ in design, the northern being pointed and the southern having a flat "Caernarvon" head.

Internally, the gate has a single room and a garderobe. The original internal access was by way of a stone spiral staircase, but this was subsequently destroyed and a wooden replacement was inserted. The room in the tower measures 10 metres (33 ft) long and 3 metres (9.8 ft) wide and has an attic and an 18th-century roof. The roof was reconstructed in 1832. From the upper room, the machine-cut rafters are visible. Drawings from the 18th and 19th centuries show a chimney in the roof, but the presence of a fireplace in the tower room is not mentioned in the available sources. The medieval roof was flat, with a castellated parapet and a wall-walk.

In 1996, the bridge was included on a list of potential World Heritage Bridges by the UNESCO advisory body, the International Council on Monuments and Sites. The criteria for World Heritage status required that the bridge be of "outstanding universal value" and illustrate "a significant stage in bridge engineering or technological developments".

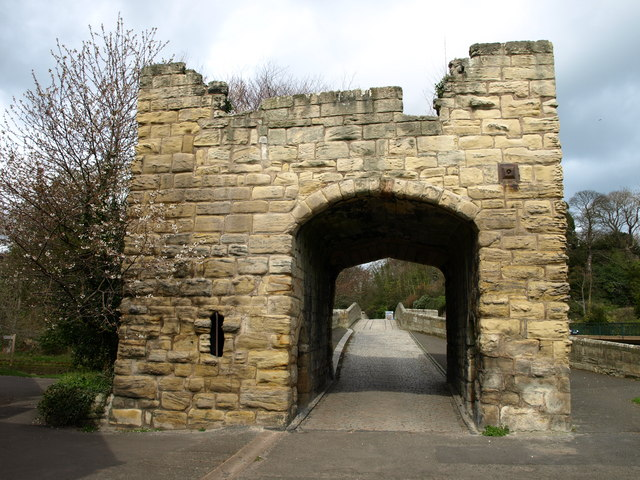
The fortified bridge at Warkworth, Northumberland

The bridge is one of only two surviving fortified bridges in the United Kingdom, the other being in Warkworth, Northumberland. There, the gatehouse stands on land at one end of the bridge, rather than on the bridge itself, and is described by the archaeologist John Steane as "less impressive" than the "superb" Monnow Gate. A recent (2016) appreciation by the historian Richard Hayman describes the Monnow Bridge as "arguably the finest surviving medieval bridge in Britain". Such bridge towers were common across mainland Europe and, to a lesser extent, in Great Britain from medieval times. British examples included the Mardol Gate in Shrewsbury and Froome Bridge in Bristol. Continental examples include the Frias Bridge, near Burgos in Spain, and the Pont Valentré, in Cahors, France. But urban expansion, the lessening of defensive requirements, and the substantial increases in traffic and trade from the 18th century onward led to the destruction of many of what was once a common bridge type. The rarity of Monnow Bridge and Gate is reflected in its status as a potential World Heritage Site, a scheduled monument, and a Grade I listed building; its listing describing it as "an outstanding medieval fortified bridge, now unique in Britain".

== See also ==
- Bridge castle

== Sources ==
- Andrews, Malcolm (1989). The Search for the Picturesque. Stanford, CA: Stanford University Press. ISBN 978-0-8047-1834-9. OCLC 19831149.
- Bagnall-Oakeley, Mary Ellen (1902). Monnow Bridge Tower. Monmouthshire pamphlets. Monmouthshire: Unknown. OCLC 46807348.
- Barley, M. W. (1975). The Plans and Topography of Medieval Towns in England and Wales. London: Council for British Archaeology. ISBN 978-0-900312-33-5.
- Bly, Phil (2012). Guide to the complete Monmouth Heritage Blue Plaque Trail. Monmouth: Monmouth Civic Society. OCLC 797974800.
- Bond, C. J. (1987). Schofield, John; Leach, Roger (eds.). Urban Archaeology in Britain (PDF). London: Council for British Archaeology. ISBN 978-0-906780-59-6.
- Bradney, Joseph (1991). A History of Monmouthshire: The Hundred of Skenfrith, Volume 1 Part 1. Academy Books. ISBN 1873361092. OCLC 669714197.
- Cadw (15 August 1974). "Monnow Bridge and Gateway (2218)". National Historic Assets of Wales.
- Cadw (24 July 1974). "Monnow Bridge (MM008)". National Historic Assets of Wales.
- Cook, Martin (1998). Medieval Bridges. Princes Risborough, Buckinghamshire: Shire Publications. ISBN 978-0-7478-0384-3.
- Coxe, William (1801). An Historical Tour in Monmouthshire. Vol. 2. London: T. Cadell, Jr. & W. Davies. OCLC 557800999.
- Creighton, Oliver; Higham, Richard (2005). Medieval Town Walls: An Archaeology and Social History of Urban Defence. London: Tempus. ISBN 978-0-7524-1445-4.
- Greene, William Henry (2012). Jack O'Kent and the Devil: Stories of a Welsh Border Hero. Chepstow: The Chepstow Society. ISBN 978-0-900278-21-1.
- Grose, Francis (1773). The Antiquities of England and Wales. London: S. Hooper. OCLC 931362823.
- Hackett, Martin (2014). "Chapter 8: The English Invasions 1216–1300" (ebook). Lost Battlefields of Wales. Amberley. ISBN 978-1-4456-3703-7.
- Hando, Fred (1964). Monmouth Town Sketch Book. Newport: R.H.Johns Ltd. OCLC 30295655.
- Hando, Fred (1964). Here and There in Monmouthshire. Newport: R.H.Johns Ltd. OCLC 30295639.
- Harrison, David (2004). The Bridges of Medieval England: Transport and Society 400–1800. Oxford: Clarendon Press. ISBN 978-0-19-927274-7.
- Harrison, David; McKeague, Peter; Watson, Bruce (2010). England's Fortified Medieval Bridges and Bridge Chapels – a new survey (PDF). Vol. 25. London: Medieval Settlement Research Group. pp. 45–51. doi:10.5284/1059045. OCLC 903076995.
- Hayman, Richard (2016). Wye. Woonton Almeley: Logaston Press. ISBN 978-1-910839-09-6.
- Heath, Charles (1804). Historical and Descriptive Accounts of the Ancient and Present State of the Town of Monmouth. Monmouth: Charles Heath. OCLC 18491234.
- Jervoise, Edwyn (1936). The Ancient Bridges of Wales and Western England. London: The Architectural Press. OCLC 1524969.
- Kenyon, John R. (2010). The Medieval Castles of Wales. Cardiff: University of Wales Press. ISBN 978-0-7083-2180-5. OCLC 693942235.
- Kissack, Keith (1975). Monmouth: The Making of a County Town. Chichester: Phillimore. ISBN 9780850332094. OCLC 255539468.
- — (1996). The Lordship, Parish and Borough of Monmouth. Hereford: Lapridge Publications. ISBN 978-1-899290-03-1. OCLC 59587626.
- — (2003). Monmouth and its Buildings. Woonton Almeley, Herefordshire: Logaston Press. ISBN 978-1-904396-01-7. OCLC 55143853.
- Leland, John (1906). Lucy Toulmin Smith (ed.). The Itinerary in Wales of John Leland In or About the Years 1536–1539. London: George Bell and Sons. OCLC 877231140.
- Michael, D.P.M. (1985). The Mapping of Monmouthshire. Bristol: Regional Publications Ltd. ISBN 0-906570-18-2.
- Mitchell, Julian (2010). The Wye Tour And Its Artists. Woonton Almeley, Herefordshire: Logaston Press. ISBN 978-1-906-66332-2. OCLC 648769582.
- Newman, John (2000). Gwent/Monmouthshire. The Buildings of Wales. London: Penguin. ISBN 978-0-300-09630-9.
- Palmer, Roy (1998). The Folklore of (Old) Monmouthshire. Woonton Almeley, Herefordshire: Logaston Press. ISBN 978-1-873827-40-6. OCLC 60165676.
- Public Works, Roads and Transport Congress (1933). British Bridges. Unknown: Public Works Roads and Transport Congress. OCLC 499888603.
- Rowlands, M. L. J. (1994). Monnow Bridge and Gate. Stroud: Alan Sutton. ISBN 978-0-7509-0415-5.
- Soulsby, Ian (1983). The Towns of Medieval Wales: A Study of Their History, Archaeology, and Early Topography. Chichester: Phillimore. ISBN 978-0-85033-437-1.
- Steane, John (1985). The Archaeology of Medieval England and Wales. Abingdon: Routledge. ISBN 978-1-138-79971-4.
- Steinman, David; Watson, Sara (1941). Bridges and Their Builders. New York: G.P. Putnam's Sons. OCLC 1381642.
- Troyano, Leonardo Fernandez (2003). Bridge Engineering: A Global Perspective. London: Thomas Telford Publishing. ISBN 978-0-7277-3215-6.
