= Oakley (given name) =

English given name

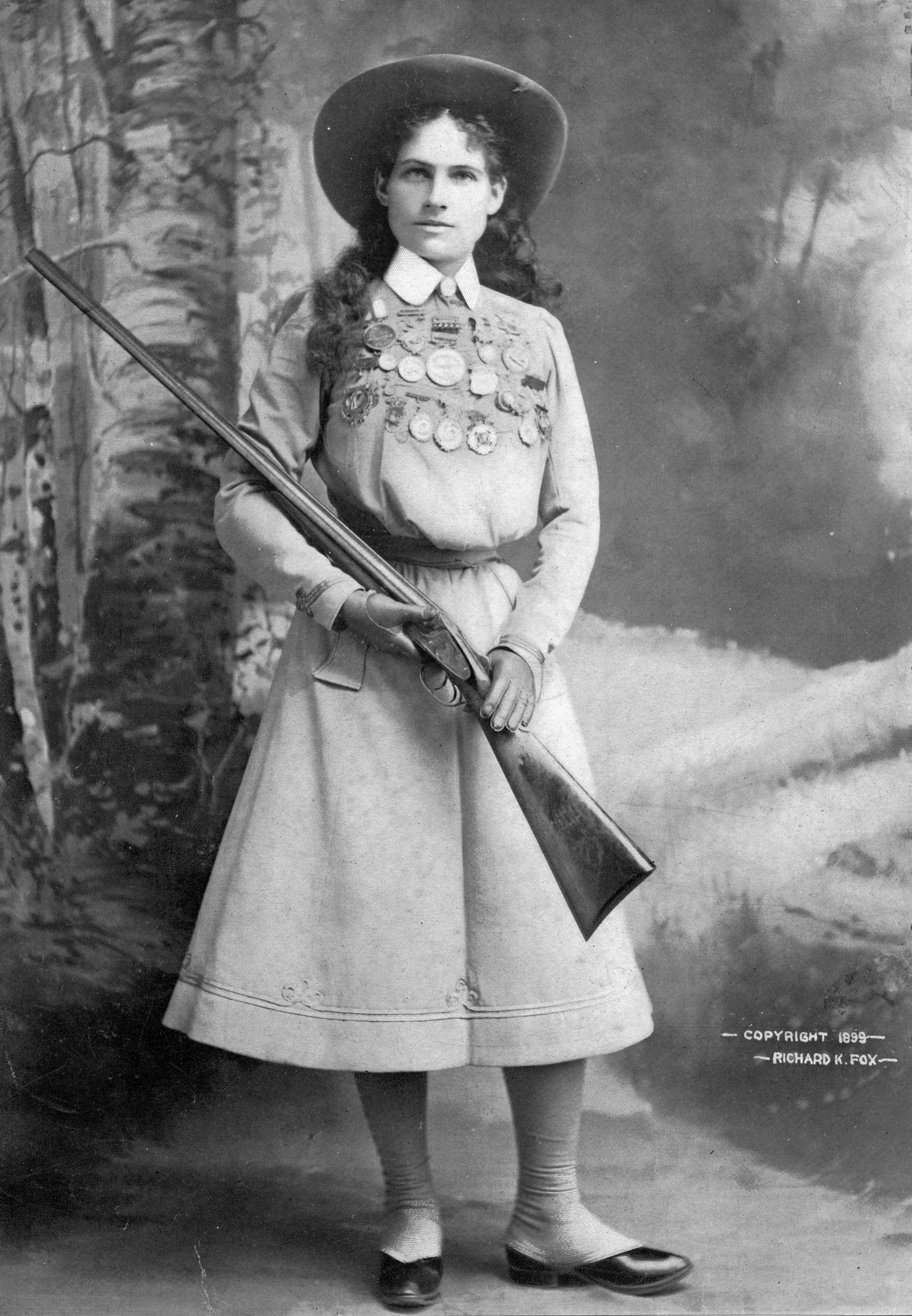
- Annie Oakley is one famous bearer of the name.
- Gender: unisex

Origin
- Origin: English
- Meaning: “oak + clearing”

Other names
- Variant forms: Oakleigh, Oakeley, Oaklea, Oaklee, Oaklei, Oakli, Oaklie, Oakliegh
- Related names: Oaklan, Oaklen, Oaklin, Oaklinn, Oaklyn, and Oaklynn

Oakley is a unisex given name of English origin that is a transferred use of an English place name and surname meaning “oak clearing”.

== Usage ==
Oakley ranked among the 1,000 most popular names for newborn boys in the United States at different times between 1884 and 1920. It then declined in use until the 2010s. It has ranked among the top 1,000 names given to newborn American boys since 2011 and for newborn American girls since 2013. It has ranked among the top 200 names for newborn American girls since 2022 and among the top 500 names for boys since 2017. Spelling variations such as Oaklea, Oaklee, Oaklei, Oakleigh, Oakli, Oaklie, and Oakliegh and variants Oaklan, Oaklen, Oaklin, Oaklinn, Oaklyn, and Oaklynn are also all in regular use. Names containing the element "Oak" have been more popular in American states where a majority of citizens voted for the Republican Party in the last Presidential election. Wider usage of these names in the United States has also been attributed to a trend started by Mormons in Utah who have a fondness for unusual names, to associations with Annie Oakley, an American sharpshooter and folk heroine, to the fashion for names related to the natural world, and to the Christian religious symbolism of the oak tree. The name Oakley has also risen in use in the United Kingdom, where it has been among the 1,000 most popular names for boys in England and Wales since 1996 and among the top 100 since 2019, and among the top 1,000 names for girls since 2020. It was also among the top 100 names for boys born in Scotland in 2023. The name has also been among the top 100 names for boys in New Zealand since 2020.

== Men ==
- Oakley Hoopes Bailey (1843–1947), American prolific panoramic map creator
- Central Cee, stage name of Oakley Neil H T Caesar-Su (born 1998), British rapper
- Oakley C. Collins (1916–1994), American politician
- Oakley C. Curtis (1865–1924), American politician and 50th governor of Maine
- Oakley Dalton (born 1952), American football player
- Oakley Haldeman (1909–1986), American songwriter ("Here Comes Santa Claus"), composer, author and the general manager for a music publisher
- Oakley Hall (1920–2008), American novelist
- Oakley C. Johnson (1890–1976), American socialist political activist and writer
- Oakley G. Kelly (1891–1966), American record setting pilot for the United States Army Air Service
- T. J. Oakley Rhinelander (1858–1946), American heir and real estate magnate who was prominent in New York Society during the Gilded Age
- George Oakley Totten Jr. (1866–1939), American architect

== See also ==
- Oakley (surname)
