= Oakley =

Oakley may refer to:

== Places ==
=== Antarctica ===
- Oakley Glacier

=== Australia ===
- Oakley, Western Australia, a locality in the Peel Region

=== United Kingdom ===
- Oakley, Bedfordshire, England
- Oakley, Buckinghamshire, England
- Oakley, Dorset, England
- Oakley, Fife, Scotland
- Oakley, Gloucestershire, England
- Oakley, Hampshire, England
- Oakley, Northamptonshire, a former civil parish in Kettering
- Oakley, Oxfordshire, England
- Oakley, Staffordshire, England
- Oakley, Suffolk, England
- Great Oakley, Essex, England
- Great Oakley, Northamptonshire, England
- Little Oakley, Essex, England
- Little Oakley, Northamptonshire, England
- Oakley Green, Berkshire, England
- Oakley Square, London, England

=== United States ===
- Oakley (Gallatin, Tennessee), listed on the National Register of Historic Places (NRHP)
- Oakley (Heathsville, Virginia), NRHP-listed in Northumberland County
- Oakley (Spotsylvania County, Virginia), NRHP-listed
- Oakley (Upperville, Virginia), NRHP-listed in Fauquier County
- Oakley, Buncombe County, North Carolina, located inside Asheville
- Oakley, California
- Oakley, Cincinnati, Ohio
- Oakley, Delaware
- Oakley, Idaho
- Oakley, Kansas
- Oakley, Maryland
- Oakley, Michigan
- Oakley, Pitt County, North Carolina
- Oakley, Utah
- Oakley, Wisconsin
- Oakley, Wyoming, a census-designated place in Lincoln County
- Oakley Township, Macon County, Illinois

== People ==
- Oakley (given name)
- Oakley (surname)

== Brands and enterprises ==
- Oakley, Inc., an eyewear manufacturer
- Oakley Hospital, earlier known as Whau Lunatic Asylum, in Auckland, New Zealand
- Oakley's, several enterprises owned by Charles Oakley

== Other uses ==
- Baron Oakley, a hereditary title
- Oakley class lifeboat a lifeboat operated by the Royal National Lifeboat Institution between 1958 and 1993
- Oakley protocol, a key management protocol (computing term)
- Oakley United F.C. (Scotland), a Scottish football club
- SS Oakley, a number of steamships of this name

== See also ==
- Oakeley (disambiguation)
- Oakleigh (disambiguation)
- Okely (surname)
- Oakley House (disambiguation)
