= Oakley House =

Oakley House may refer to:

- George D. Oakley House, Honolulu, Hawaii
- Audubon State Historic Site, which includes Oakley Plantation House, St. Francisville, Louisiana, a National Register of Historic Places listing in West Feliciana Parish, Louisiana
- Annie Oakley House, Cambridge, Maryland
- Van Buskirk-Oakley House, Oradell, New Jersey
- John Oakley House, West Hills, New York
- Violet Oakley Studio, Philadelphia, Pennsylvania
- Oakley (Gallatin, Tennessee)
- Ami and Amanda Oakley House, Springville, Utah
- Oakley (Heathsville, Virginia)
- Oakley Hill, Mechanicsville, Virginia
- Oakley (Spotsylvania County, Virginia)
- Oakley (Upperville, Virginia)

== See also ==
- Oakley (disambiguation)
- Oakley Chapel African Methodist Episcopal Church, Tebbetts, Missouri, a National Register of Historic Places listing in Jefferson County, Missouri
- Oakley Historic District, Oakley, Idaho
