= Oakley (surname) =

Oakley is a surname of English origin, and may refer to:

== People ==
- Alan Oakley (journalist), English-born Australian journalist and magazine editor
- Alex Oakley (1926–2010), Canadian racewalker
- Ann Oakley (born 1944), British sociologist, feminist, and writer
- Annie Oakley (1860–1926), American sharpshooter and exhibition shooter
- Anthony Oakley (born 1981), American football player
- Barry Oakley (born 1931), Australian writer
- Ben Oakley (born 1988), English canoeist
- Berry Oakley (1948–1972), American musician, founding member of The Allman Brothers Band
- Bill Oakley (born 1966), American television writer; known for work on The Simpsons
- Bill Oakley (1964–2004), American comic book letterer
- Brian Oakley (1927–2012), British civil servant and director of the 1980s Alvey Programme
- Charles Oakley (born 1963), American basketball player
- Charles Oakley (American football) (born 1931), American football player
- David Oakley (1945–2006), American golfer
- Delceita Oakley (1944–2019), Panamanian sprinter
- Francis Christopher Oakley (born 1931), English-American educator and historian
- Georgia Oakley (born 1988), English film director and screenwriter
- Graham Oakley (1929–2022), English author and illustrator
- Isabel Cooper-Oakley (1854–1914), Indian-born theosophist and author
- James Oakley (disambiguation), several people
- Jarrad Oakley-Nicholls (born 1988), Australian football player
- Kenneth Oakley (1911–1981), English physical anthropologist, geologist, and paleontologist
- Laura Oakley (1879–1957), American silent film actress
- Mark Oakley (born 1968), Church of England Dean of Southwark
- Matthew Oakley (born 1977), English football player
- Miranda Oakley (born 1984), Palestinian American sport climber
- Norman Oakley (1939–2016), English footballer
- Pete Oakley (born 1949), American golfer
- Peter Oakley (1927–2014), English internet celebrity
- Phyllis E. Oakley (1934–2022), American diplomat
- Robert B. Oakley (1931–2014), American professional diplomat and ambassador
- Robin Oakley (born 1941), British journalist and political editor for CNN and BBC
- Roger Oakley (born 1943), New Zealand actor
- Ross Oakley (born 1942), Australian businessman; chief of the Victorian Football League and Australian Football League
- Sarah Oakley (born 1974), Royal Navy officer
- Shane Oakley, English illustrator and comic book artist
- Stephen Oakley (born 1958), British classicist and academic
- Sundra Oakley (born 1975), Jamaican-American actress and reality-television participant
- Thomas Oakley (disambiguation), several people
- Tyler Oakley (born 1989), American internet celebrity and LGBTQ rights activist
- Violet Oakley (1874–1961), American artist and art teacher
- William Oakley (1873–1934), English football player
- William Oakley (Medal of Honor) (1857–1918), American Medal of Honor recipient

== See also ==
- A. Oakey Hall (1826–1898), Mayor of New York City, name often misspelled "Oakley"
- Oakley Hoopes Bailey (1843–1947), prolific panoramic map creator

== Fictional person ==
- Sting Oakley, character in the anime series Gundam SEED Destiny
