= Oakley Farm =

Oakley Farm may refer to:

- Oakley Youth Development Center, also known as Oakley Farm, in Hinds County, Mississippi
- Oakley Farm (Warm Springs, Virginia), listed on the National Register of Historic Places
- Audubon State Historic Site, which includes Oakley Plantation House (St. Francisville, Louisiana), listed on the National Register of Historic Places
- Walker-Combs-Hartshorne Farmstead, also known as Oakley Farm, in Freehold Township, New Jersey

== See also ==
- Oakley House (disambiguation)
