= Okely =

Okely is a surname. Notable people with the surname include:

- Demi Okely (born 1997), Australian rules footballer
- Judith Okely (born 1941), British anthropologist
- William Ignatius Okely, 19th-century English architect

== See also ==
- Oakleigh (disambiguation)
- Oakley (disambiguation)
- Oakeley (disambiguation)
- Okey (surname)
