= Oakeley =

Oakeley may refer to:

== People ==
- Atholl Oakeley (1900–1987), heavyweight boxer
- Sir Charles Oakeley, 1st Baronet (1751–1826), Governor of Madras
- Frederick Oakeley (1802–1880), translated Adeste Fideles (Oh Come All Ye Faithful) into English
- Herbert Oakeley (1830-1903), English organist and composer
- W. E. Oakeley (1828–1912), owner of the Oakeley Quarry
- Richard Bagnall-Oakeley (1865–1947), Welsh Olympic archer
- Hugh Oakeley Arnold-Forster (1855–1909), British politician
- Oakeley Baronets, of Shrewsbury

== Places ==
- Oakeley Quarry, Blaenau Ffestiniog

== See also ==
- Oakley (disambiguation)
- Oakleigh (disambiguation)
- Okely (surname)
