= Van Buskirk-Oakley House =

Historic house in New Jersey, United States

- U.S. National Register of Historic Places
- New Jersey Register of Historic Places
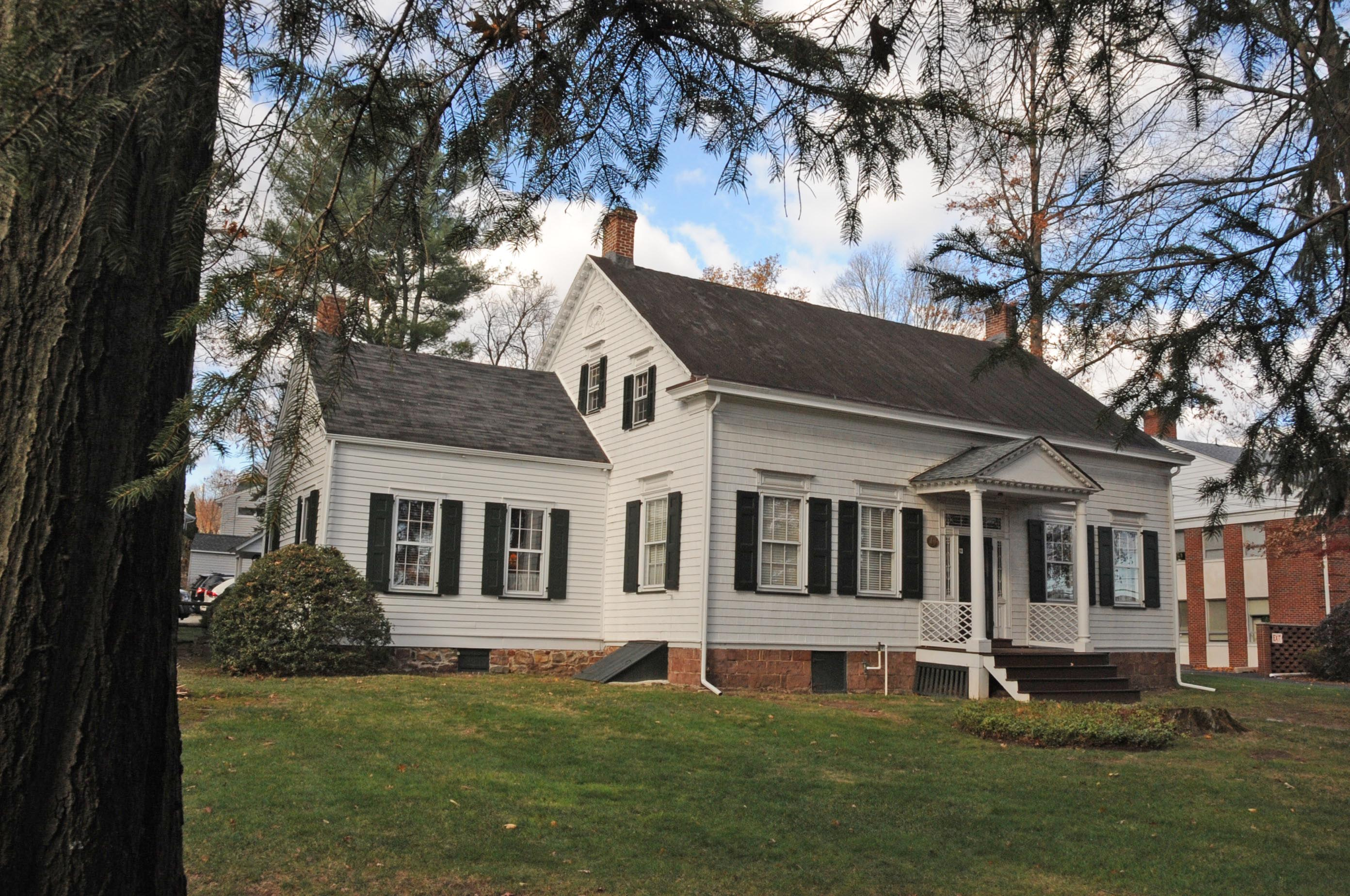
- Van Buskirk-Oakley House in 2015

- Location within Bergen County, New Jersey Location within New Jersey Location within the United States
- Location: 467 Kinderkamack Road, Oradell, New Jersey
- Coordinates: 40°57′23″N 74°1′55″W
- Area: 0.7 acres (0.28 ha)
- Built: 1834
- Architectural style: Greek Revival, Federal
- NRHP reference No.: 79001474
- NJRHP No.: 615

Significant dates
- Added to NRHP: July 3, 1979
- Designated NJRHP: March 29, 1979

Van Buskirk-Oakley House is located in Oradell, Bergen County, New Jersey, United States. The house was built in 1834 and was added to the National Register of Historic Places on July 3, 1979.

== See also ==
- National Register of Historic Places listings in Bergen County, New Jersey
