= Ami and Amanda Oakley House =

Historic house in Utah, United States

- U.S. National Register of Historic Places
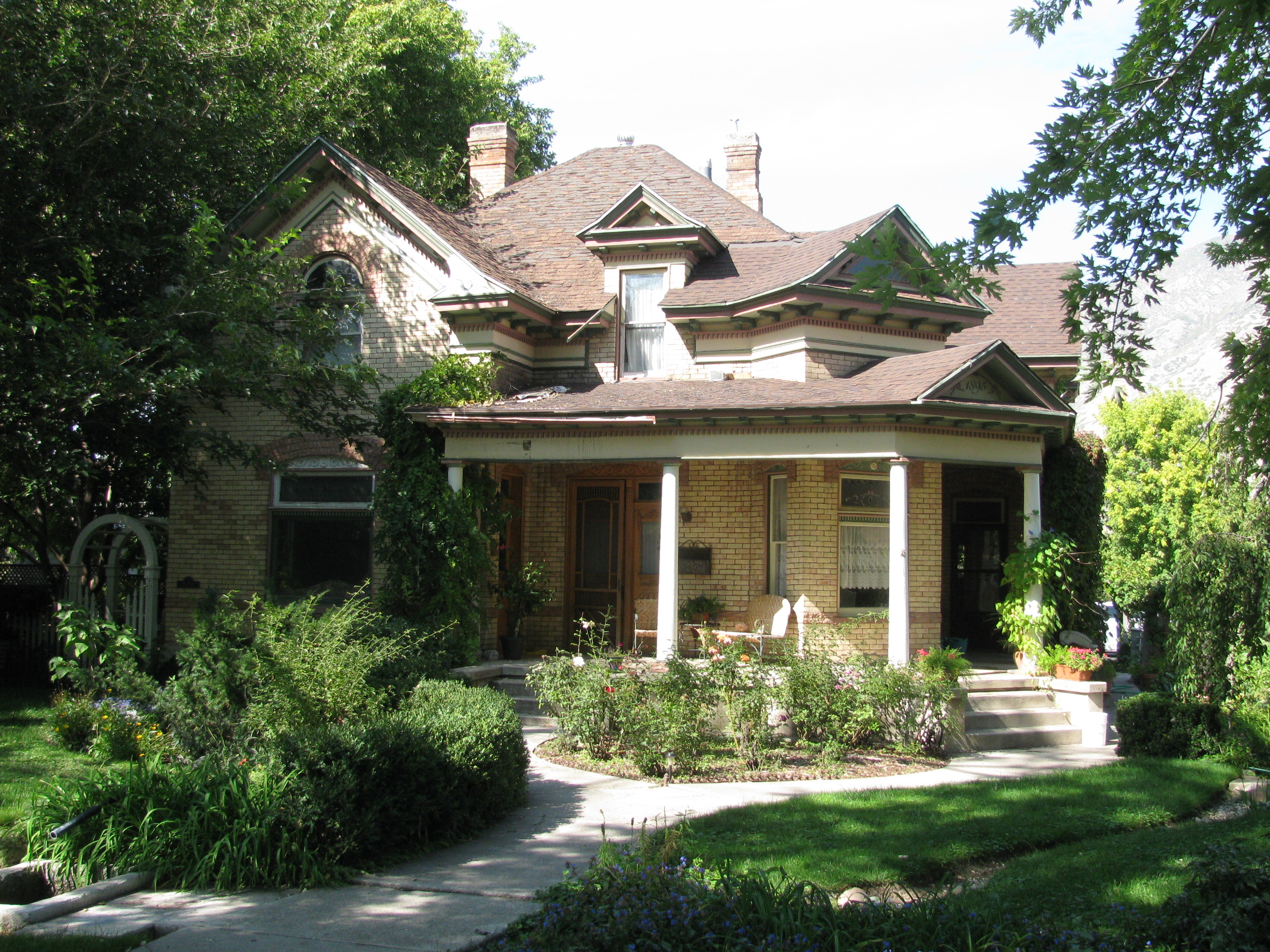

- Location within Utah Location within the United States
- Location: 219 E 400 N, Springville, Utah
- Coordinates: 40°10′21″N 111°36′20″W
- Area: 0.3 acres (0.12 ha)
- Built: 1895
- Architectural style: Late Victorian
- MPS: Springville MPS
- NRHP reference No.: 97001575
- Added to NRHP: January 5, 1998

The Ami and Amanda Oakley House at 219 E 400 N in Springville, Utah was built in 1895. It was listed on the National Register of Historic Places (NRHP) in 1998.

It is built of fired brick, and, according to its NRHP nomination "is an excellent example of the high quality craftsmanship and design available in Springville near the turn of the [20th] century."
