= Thomas Oakley =

Thomas Oakley may refer to:

- Thomas J. Oakley (1783–1857), United States Congressman from New York
- Thomas Oakley (British politician) (1874–1936), English politician, Member of Parliament for The Wrekin 1924–1929
