= SS Oakley =

A number of steamships have been named Oakley, including:

- SS Oakley (1921), 987 GRT coaster, in service 1947–53
- SS Oakley (1941), 8,129 GRT tanker, in service 1952–62
