= James Oakley =

James Oakley may refer to:

- James Oakley (director), American film director, producer and writer
- James Oakley (politician), judge and county commissioner in Texas
- James Oakley (footballer) (1901–1972), English footballer
- James M. Oakley (1839–1887), American politician from New York
- James Oakley (Fair City), a character in Fair City
