= O. H. Bailey =

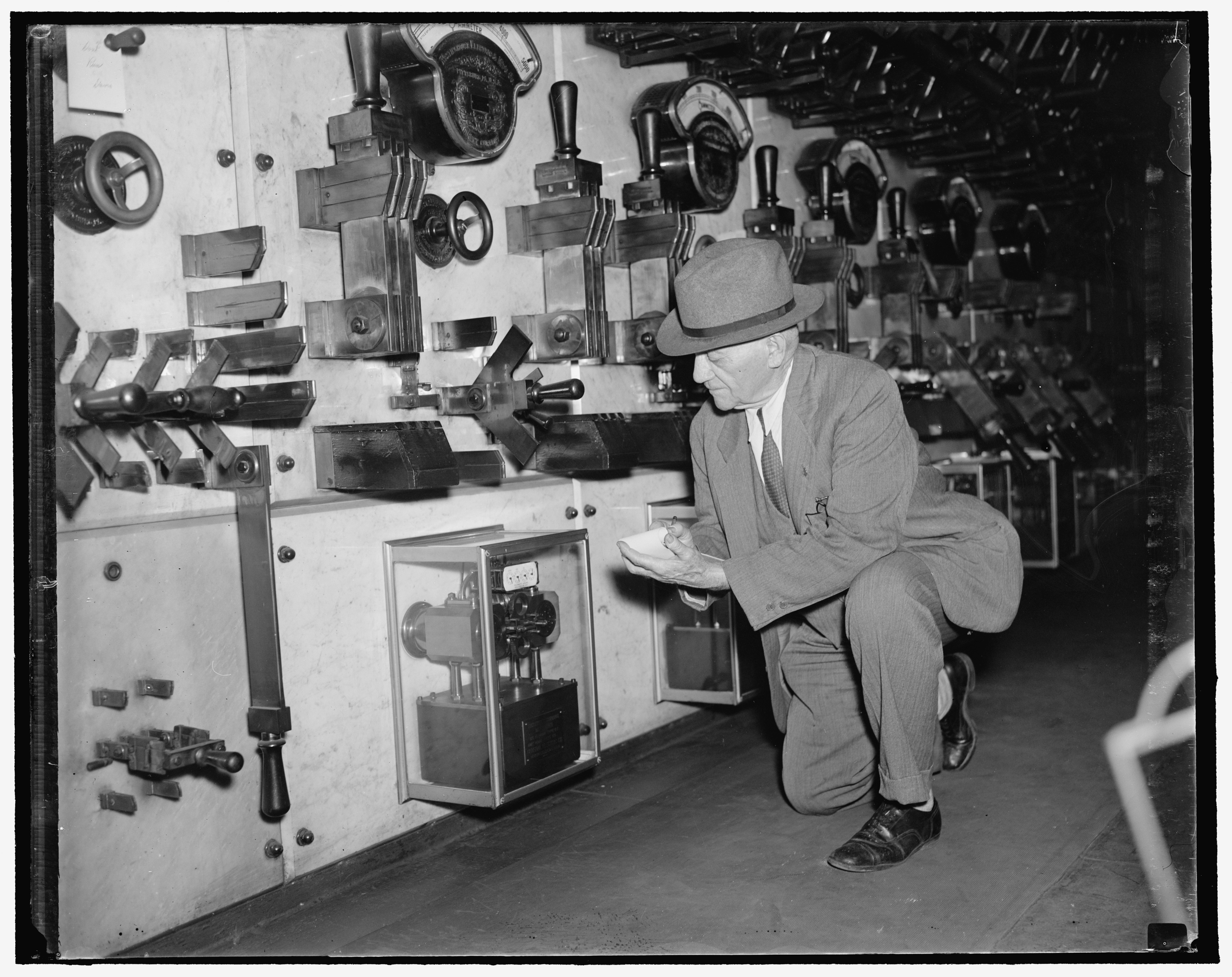
- Born: Oakley Hoopes Bailey; June 14, 1843; Mahoning County, Ohio, U.S.
- Died: August 13, 1947 (aged 104); Alliance, Ohio, U.S.
- Occupation: Map maker
- Known for: Birds eye view maps, Panoramic maps

Oakley Hoopes Bailey (June 14, 1843 – August 13, 1947) was a prolific panoramic map creator for several decades. He produced 374 maps from 1871 until he retired in 1927. Aerial photography replaced the months long process of capturing views drawn in panoramic maps to a process that could be done in a day. The Library of Congress has a collection of his maps.

He was born in Mahoning County, Ohio and studied at Mount Union College in Alliance, Ohio in 1862. In 1864, he served with the 143d Ohio Volunteer Militia, Company F, before returning to Mount Union and graduating in 1866. He began making maps in 1871, moved to Boston, and made many maps of areas in Massachusetts and Connecticut.

He died in Alliance, Ohio at age 104.

== Maps ==
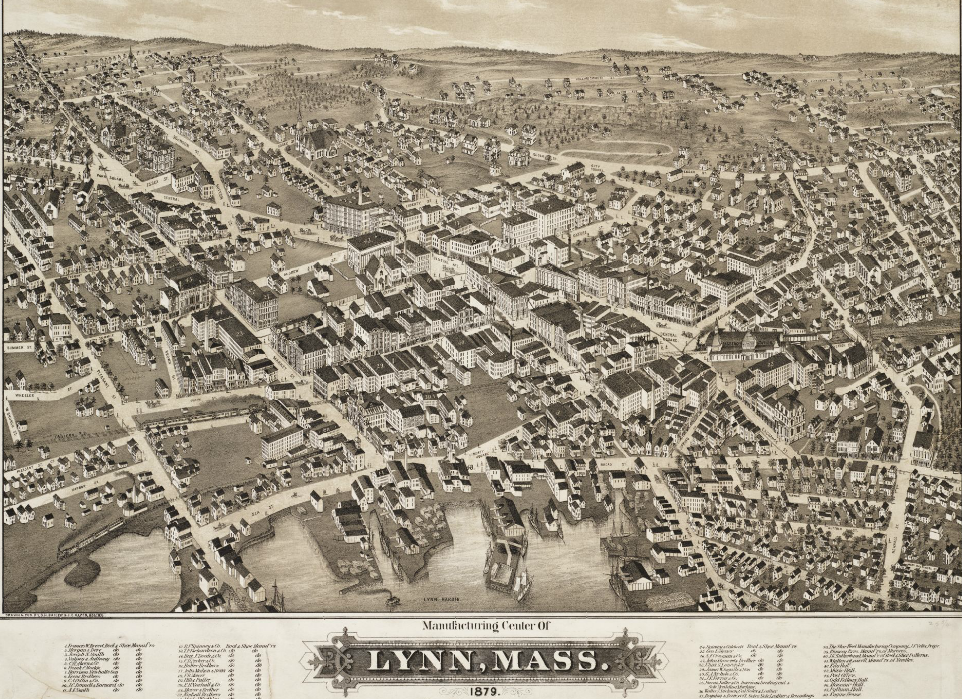
Lynn, Massachusetts (1879)

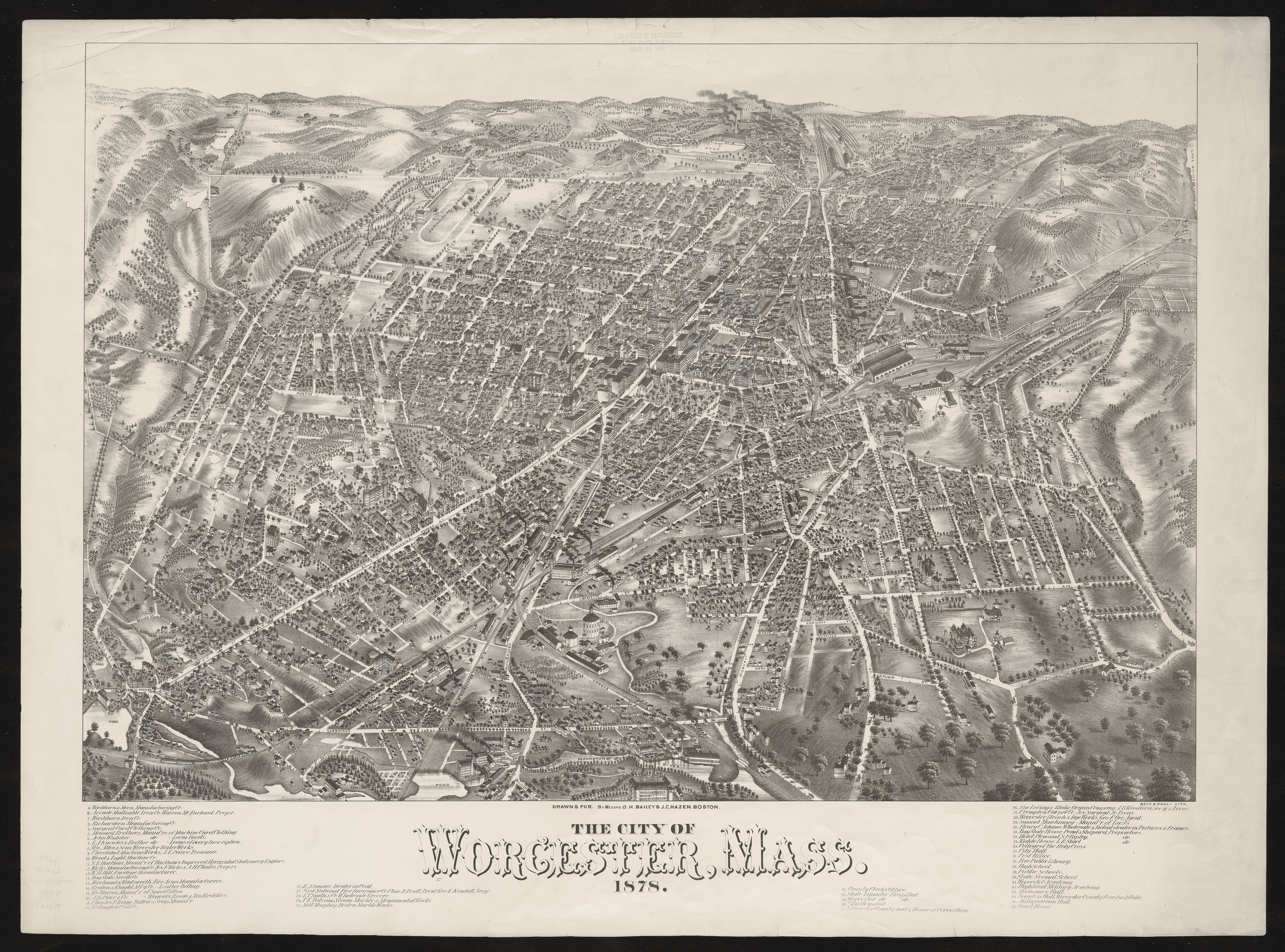
Worcester, Massachusetts (1878)

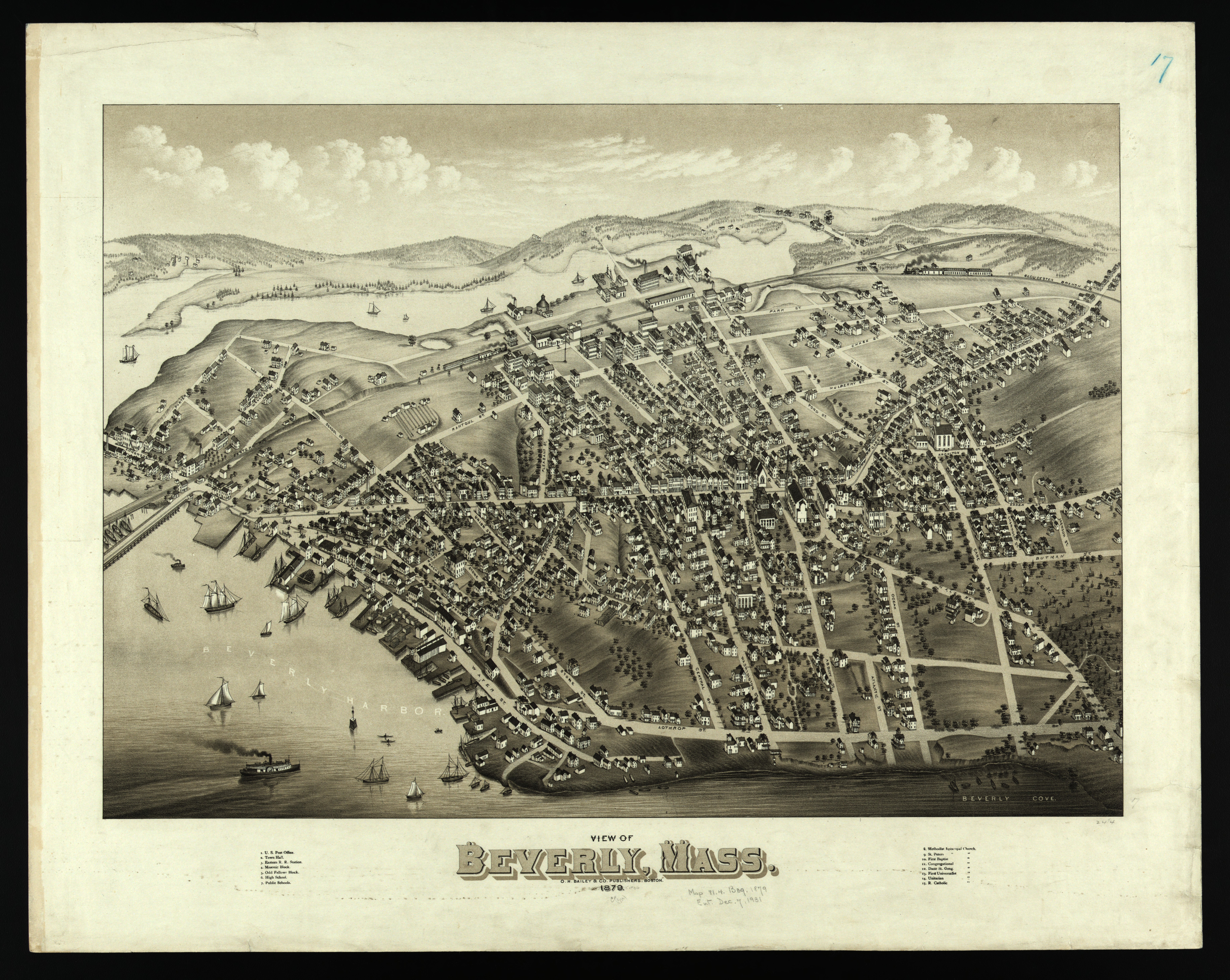
Beverly, Massachusetts

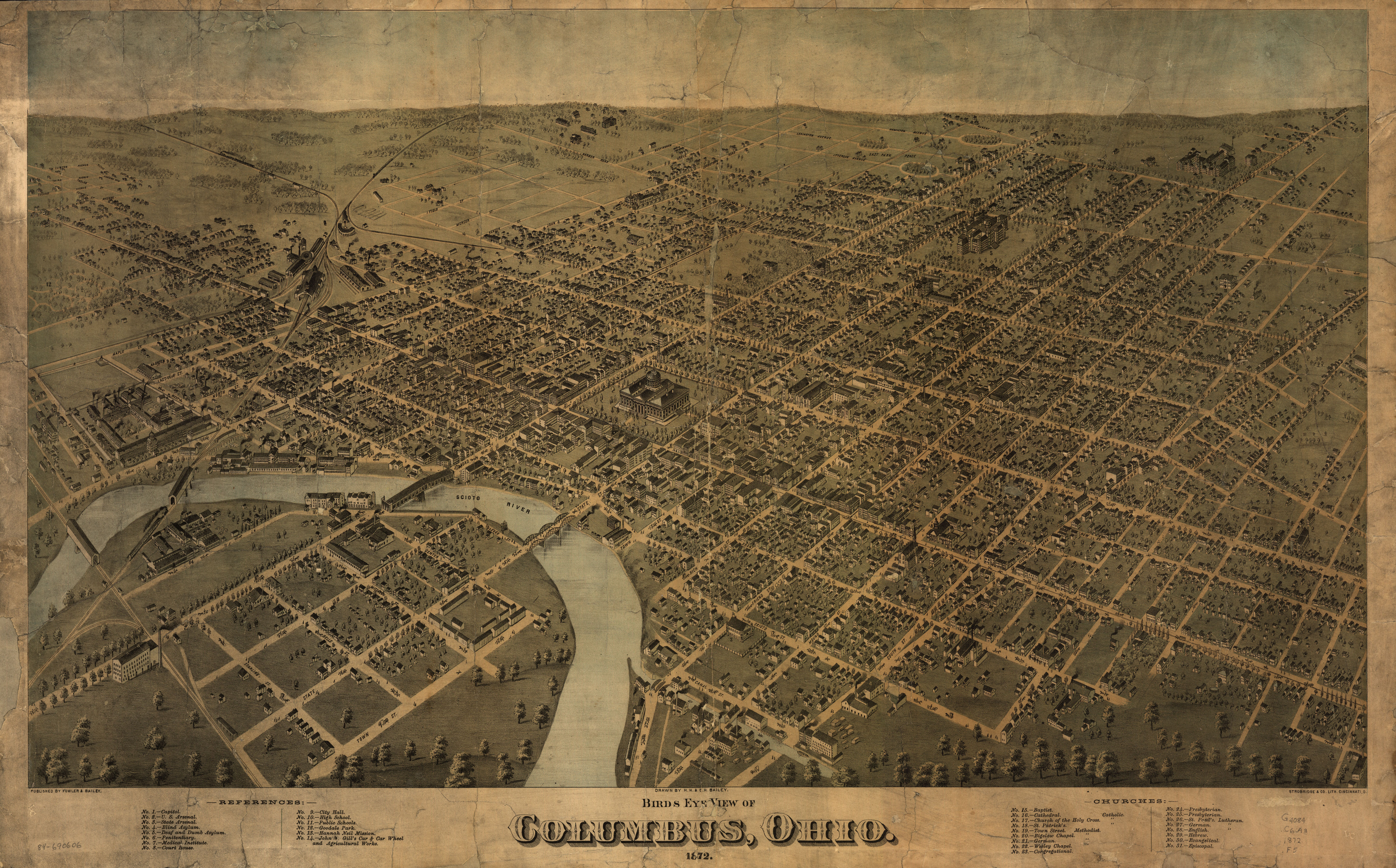
Columbus, Ohio

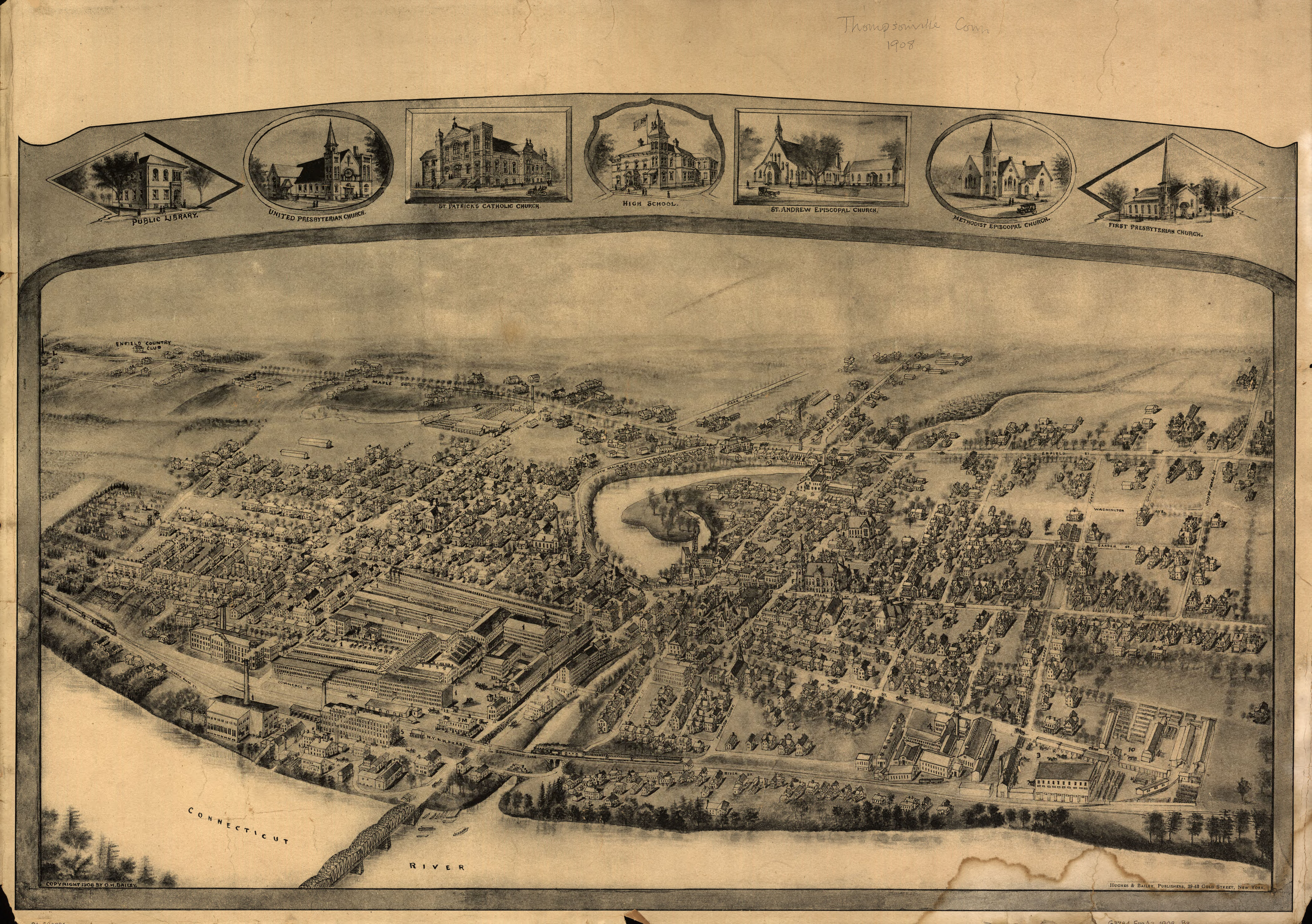
Thompsonville, Connecticut

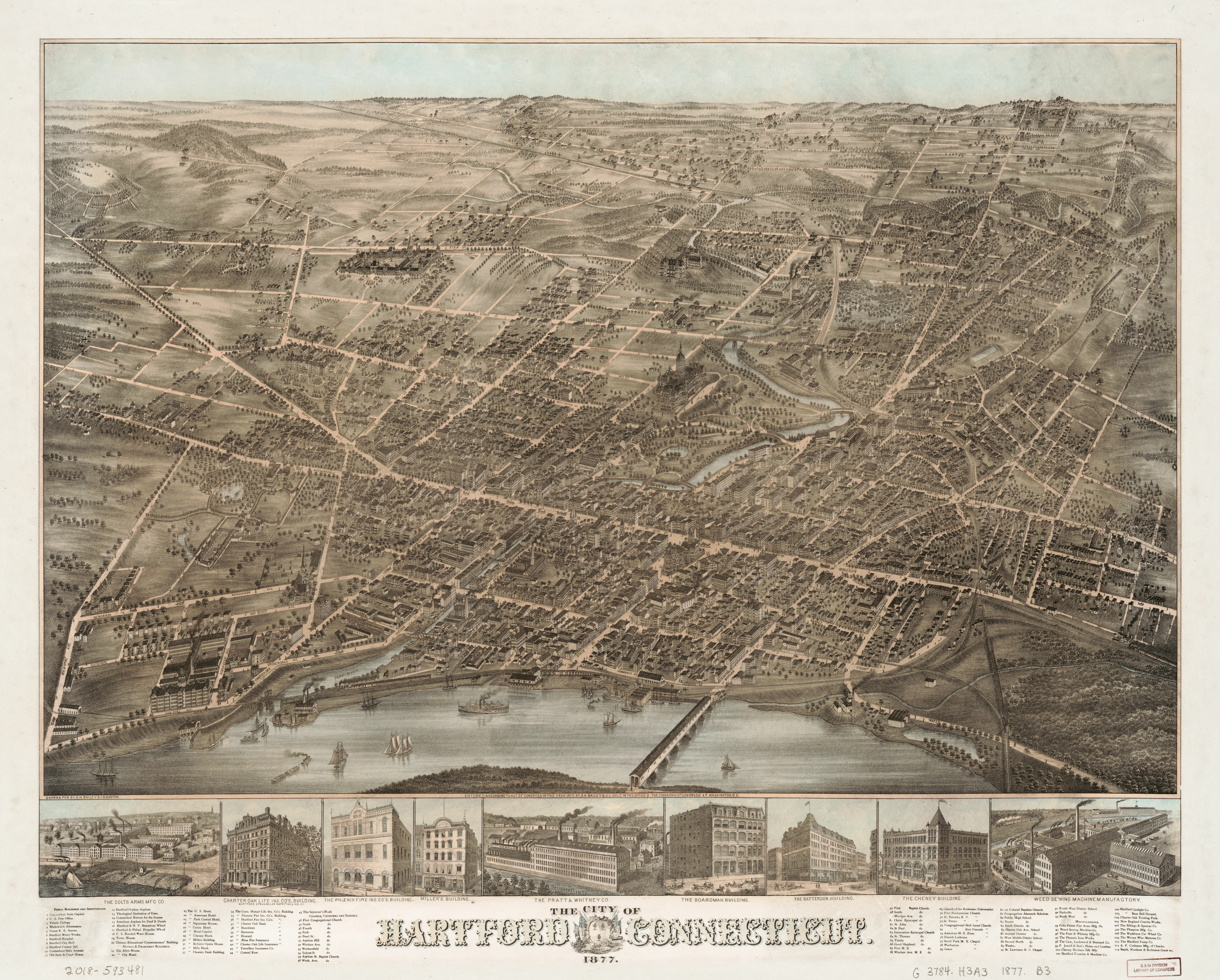
Hartford, Connecticut

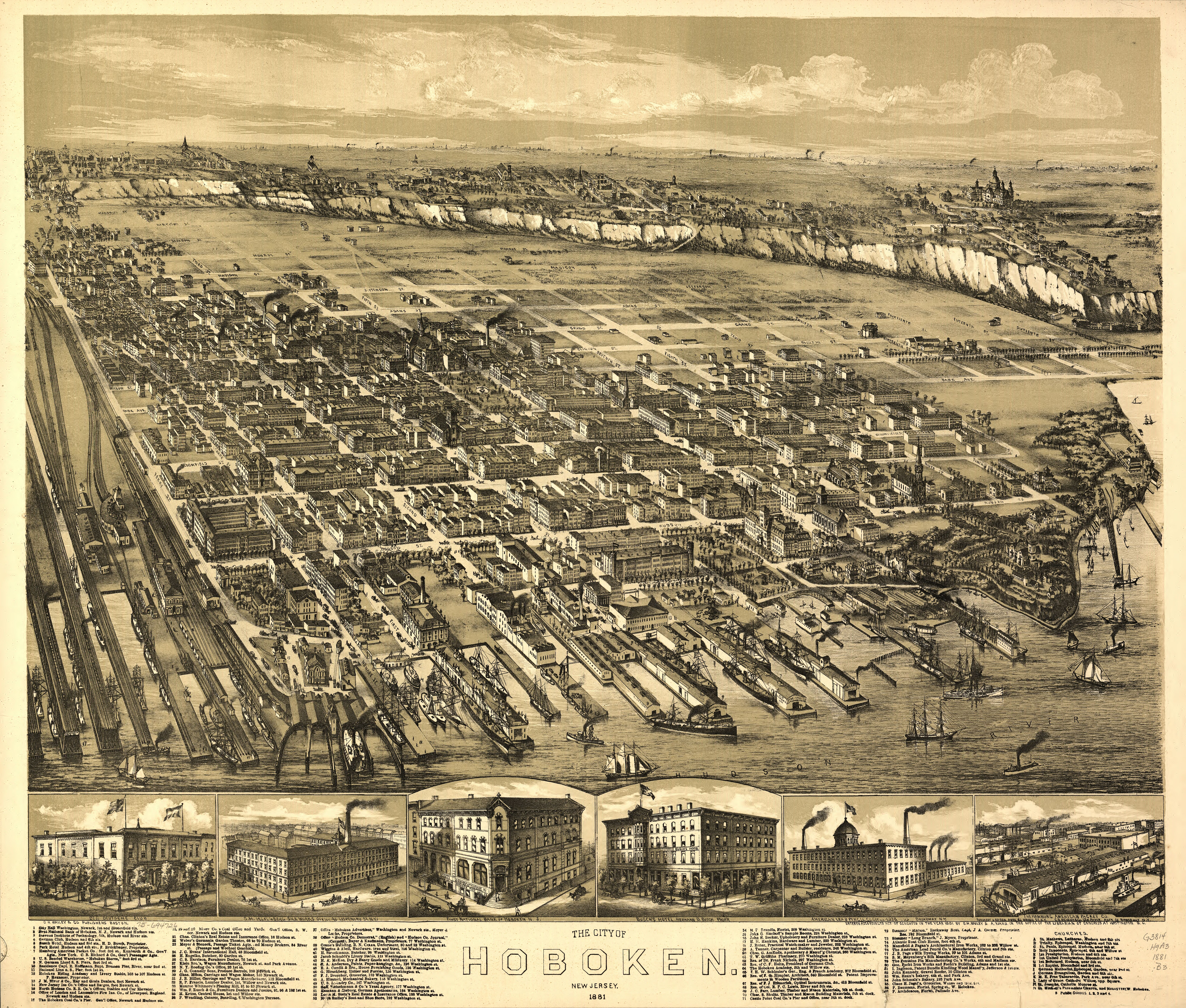
Hoboken, New Jersey

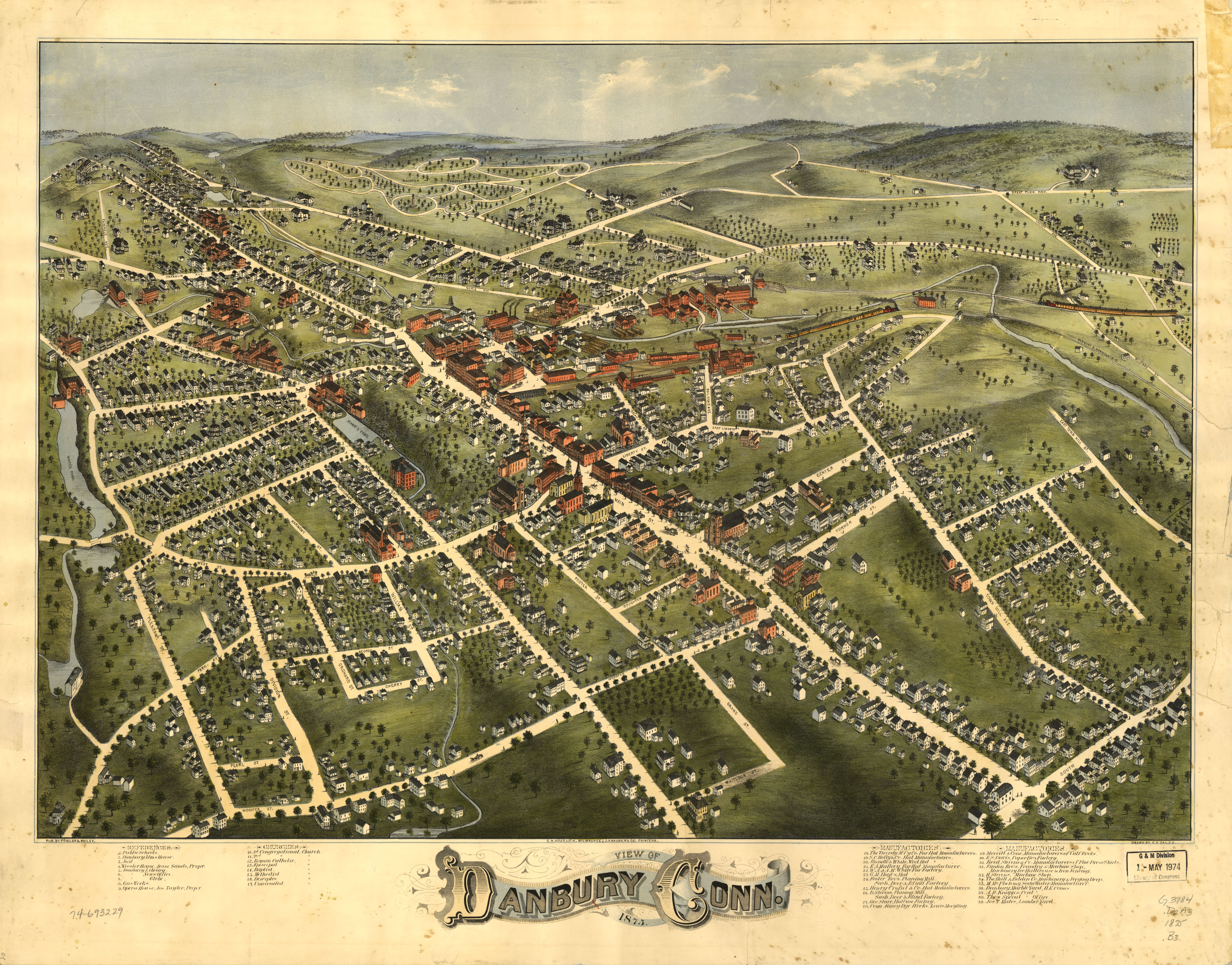
Danbury, Connecticut

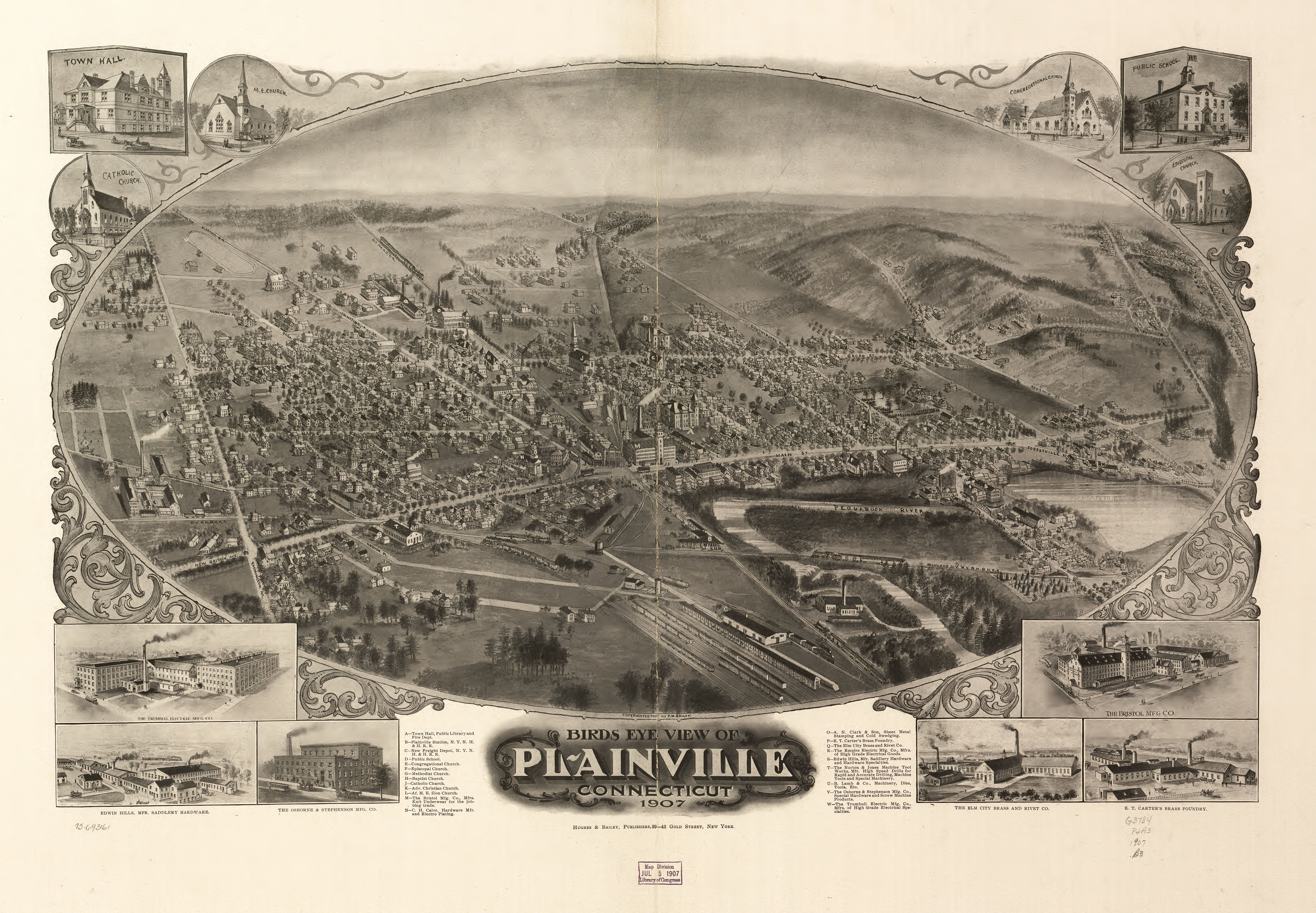
Plainville, Connecticut (1907)

Torrington, Connecticut

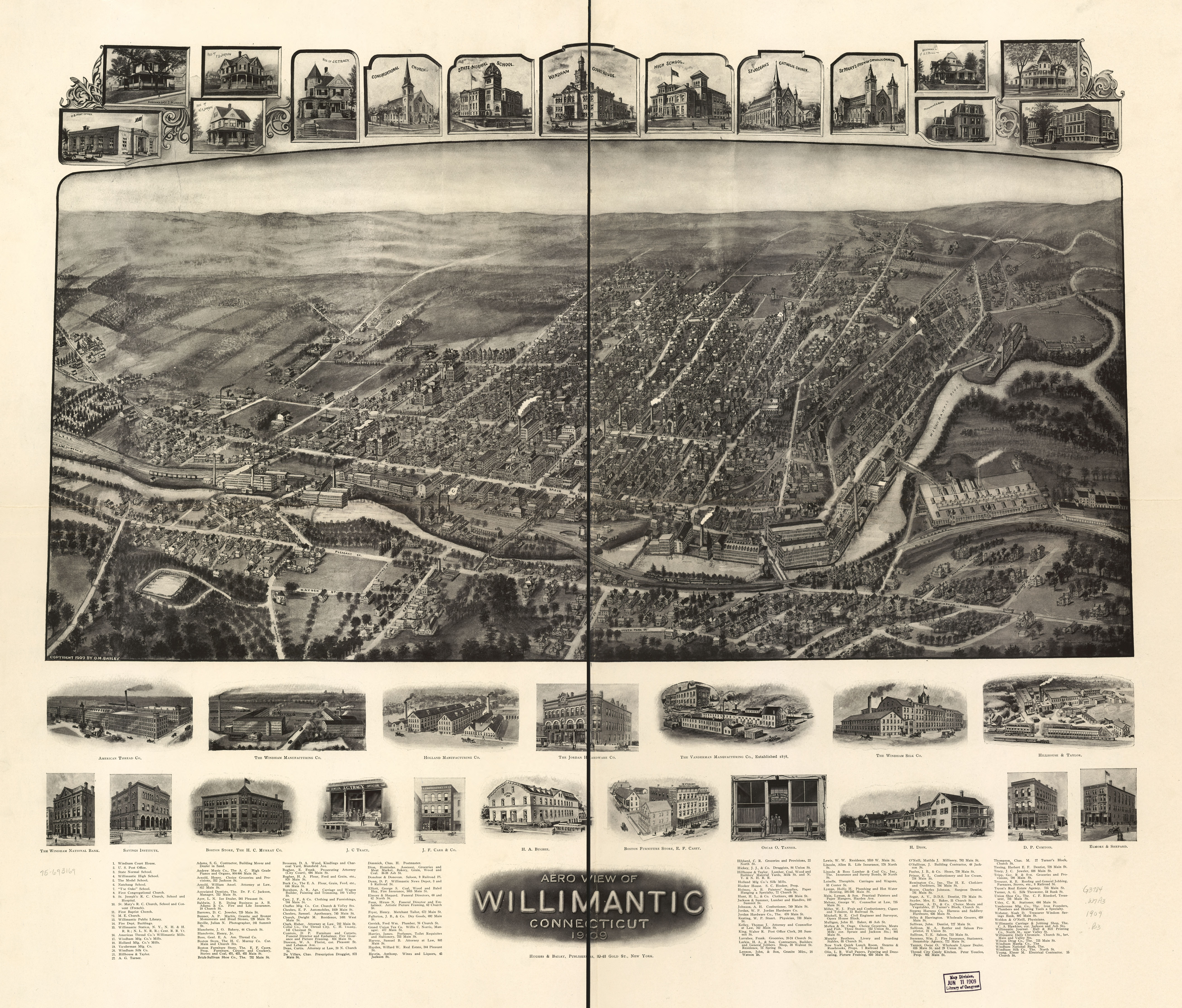
Willimantic, Connecticut

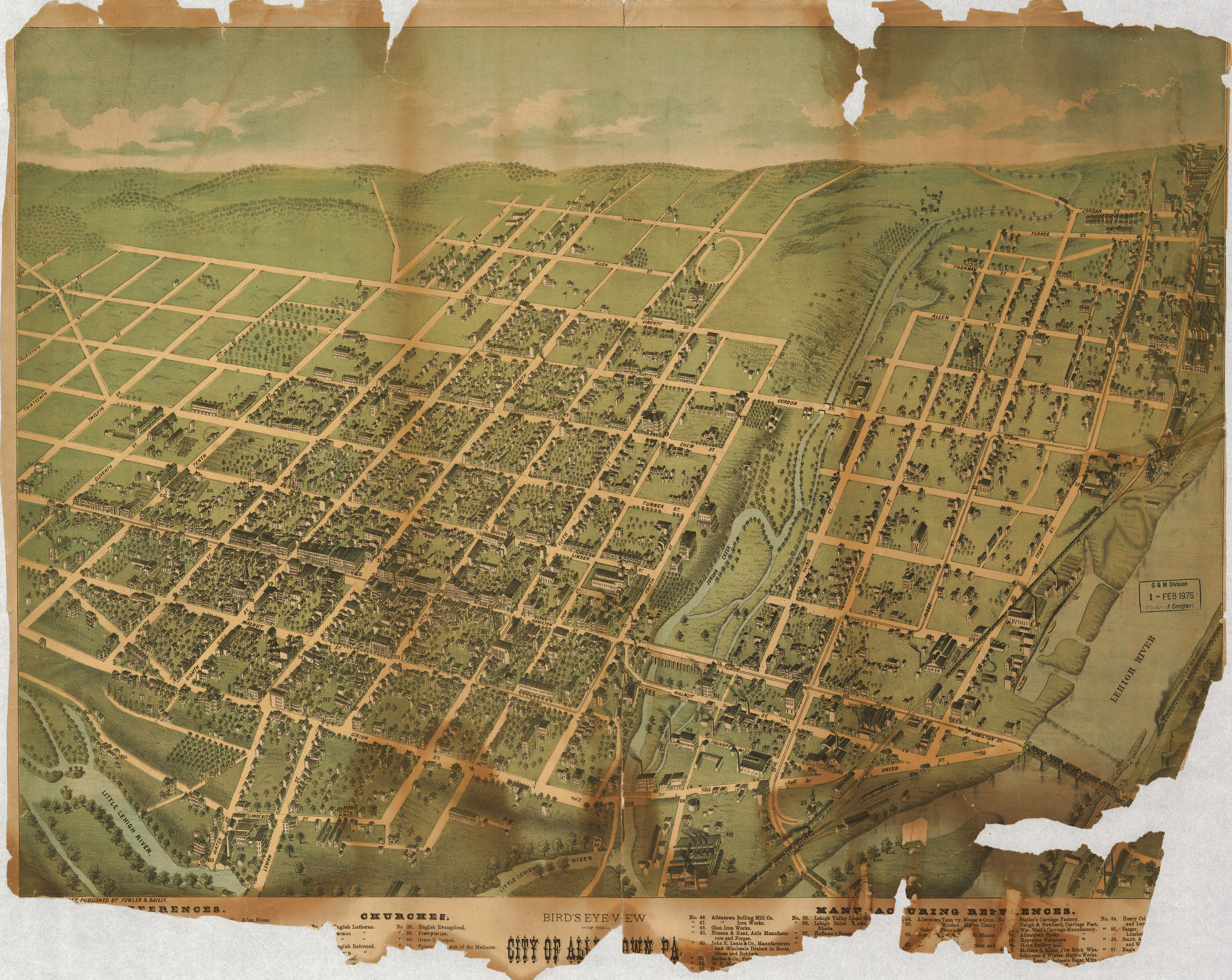
Allentown, Pennsylvania

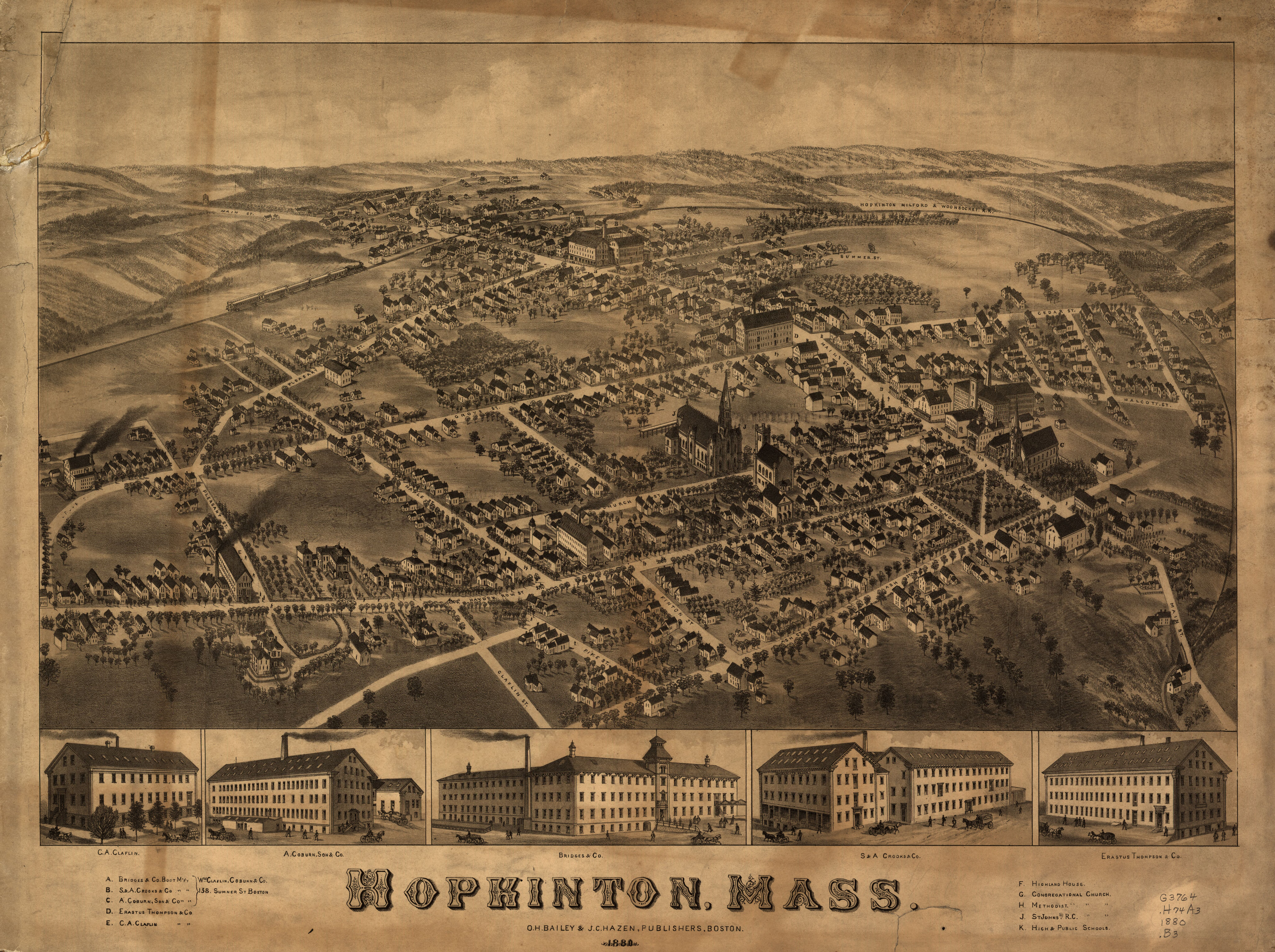
Hopkinton, Massachusetts

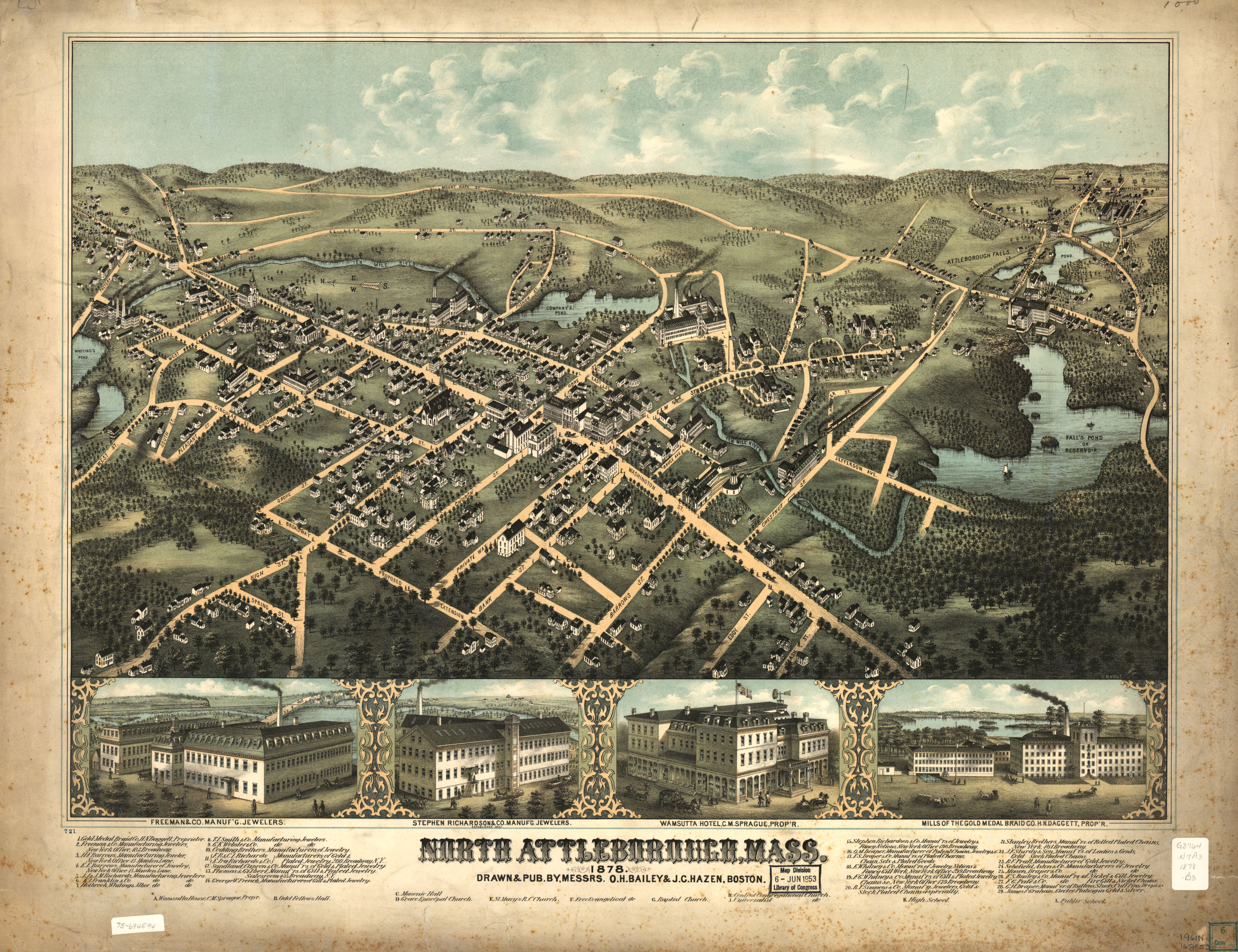
North Attleborough, Massachusetts

Fall River, Massachusetts

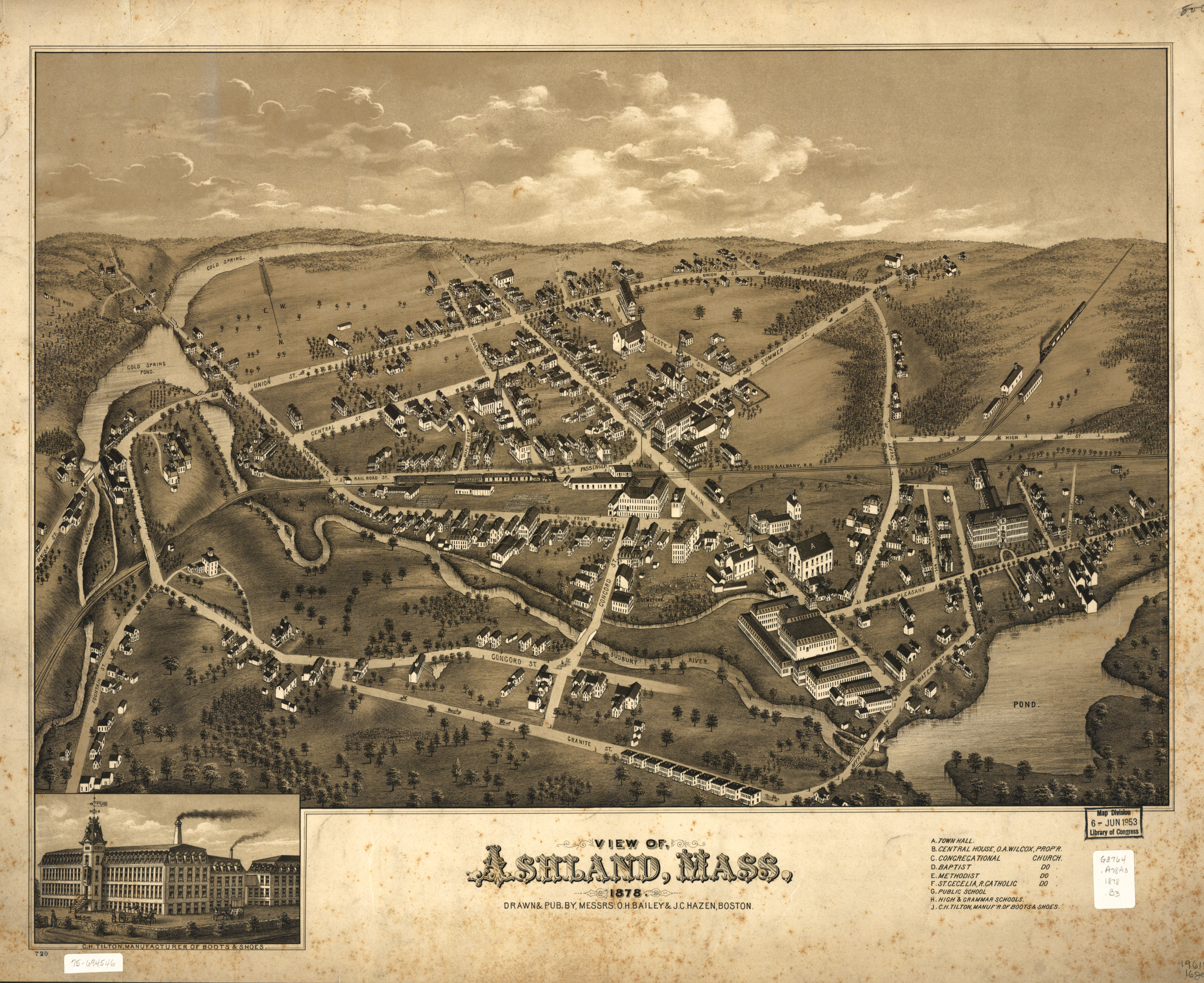
Ashland, Massachusetts

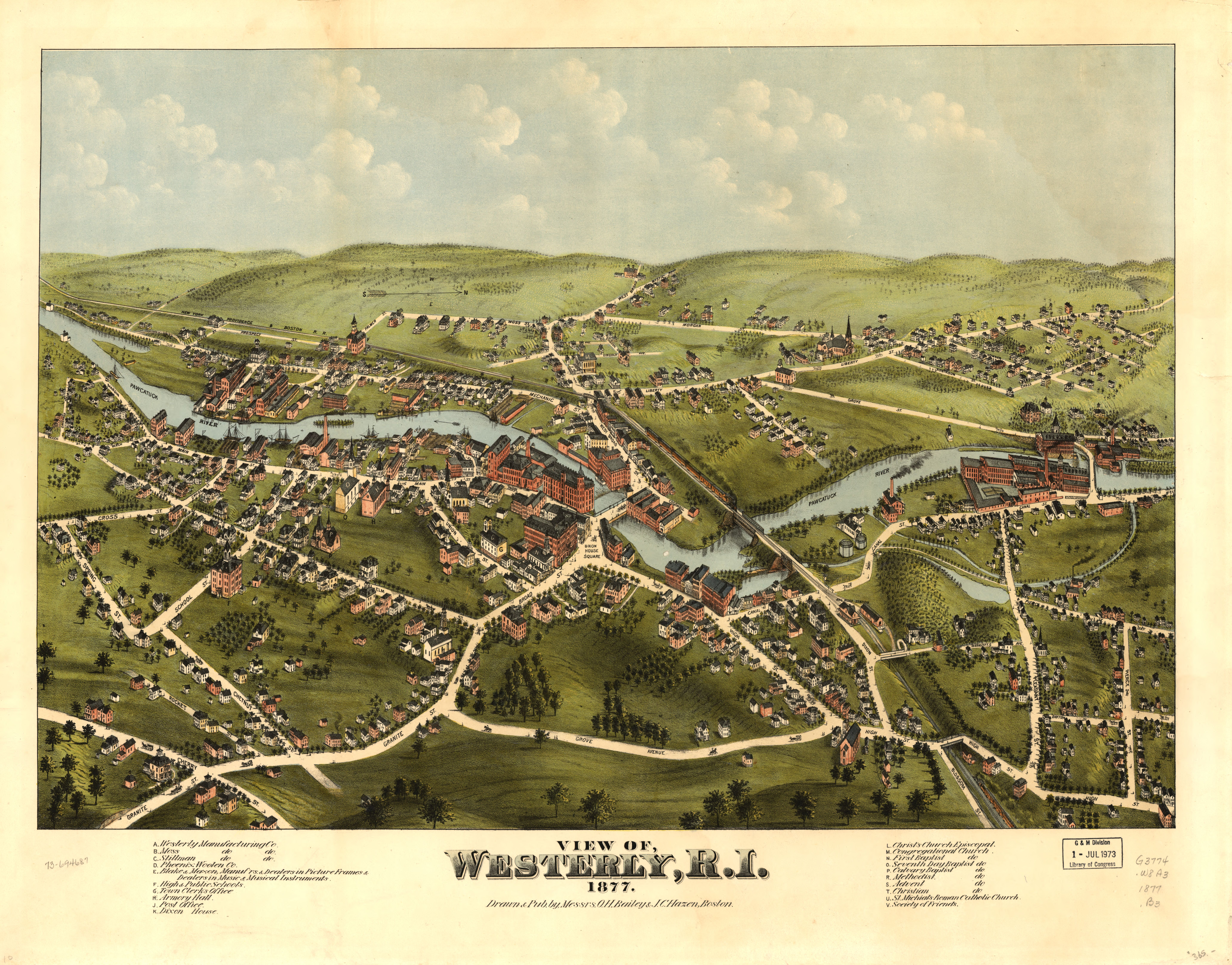
Westerly, Rhode Island

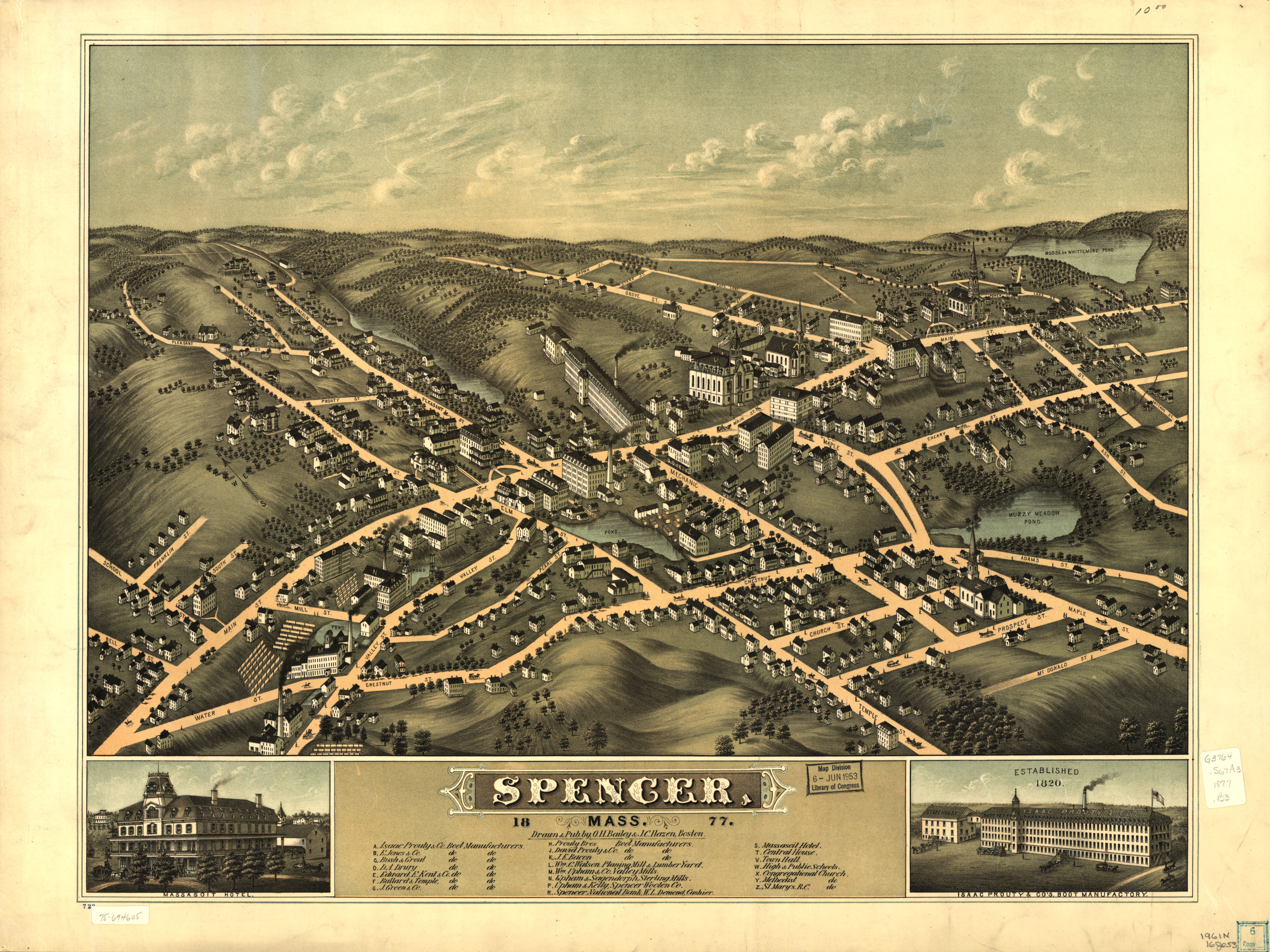
Spencer, Massachusetts

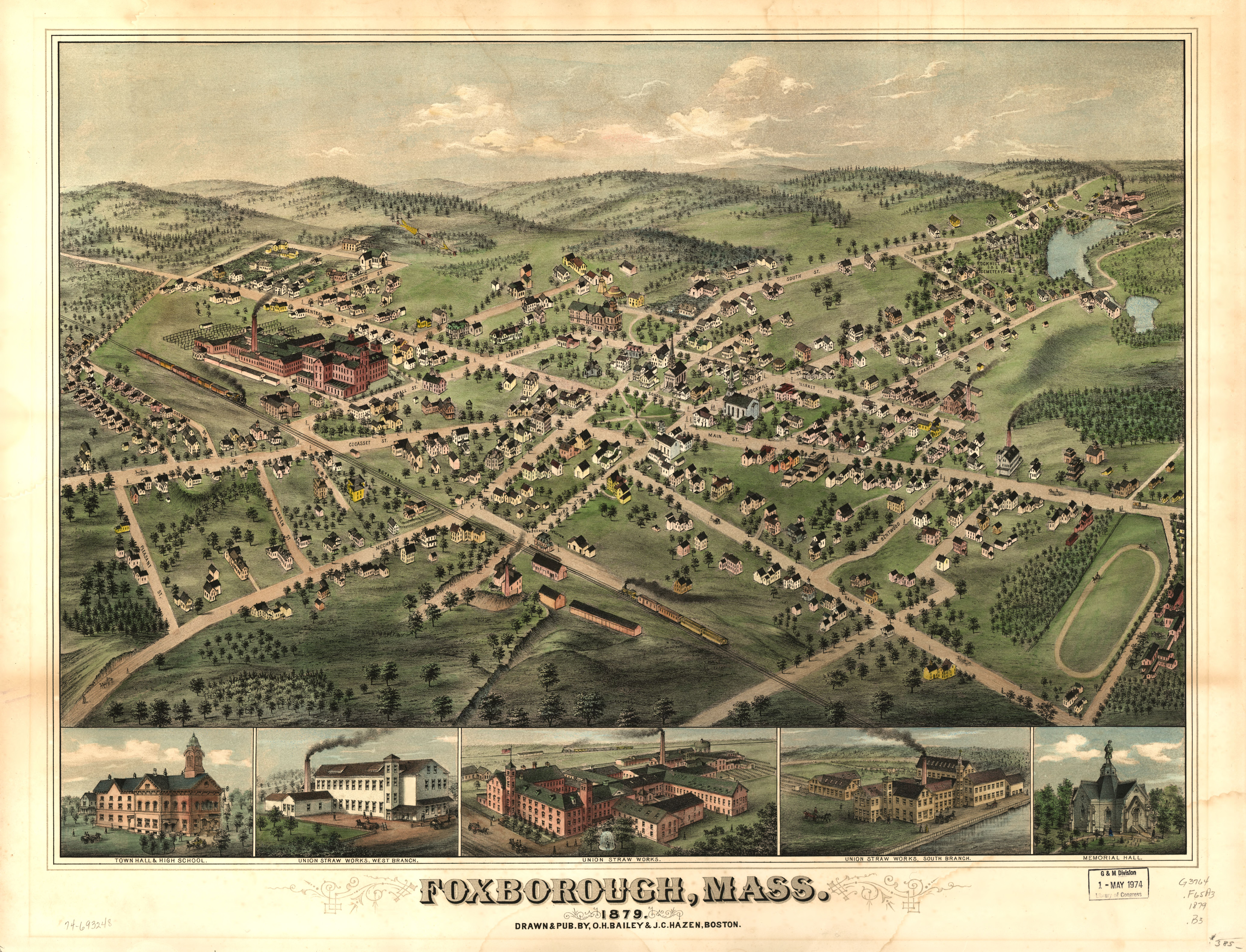
Foxborough, Massachusetts

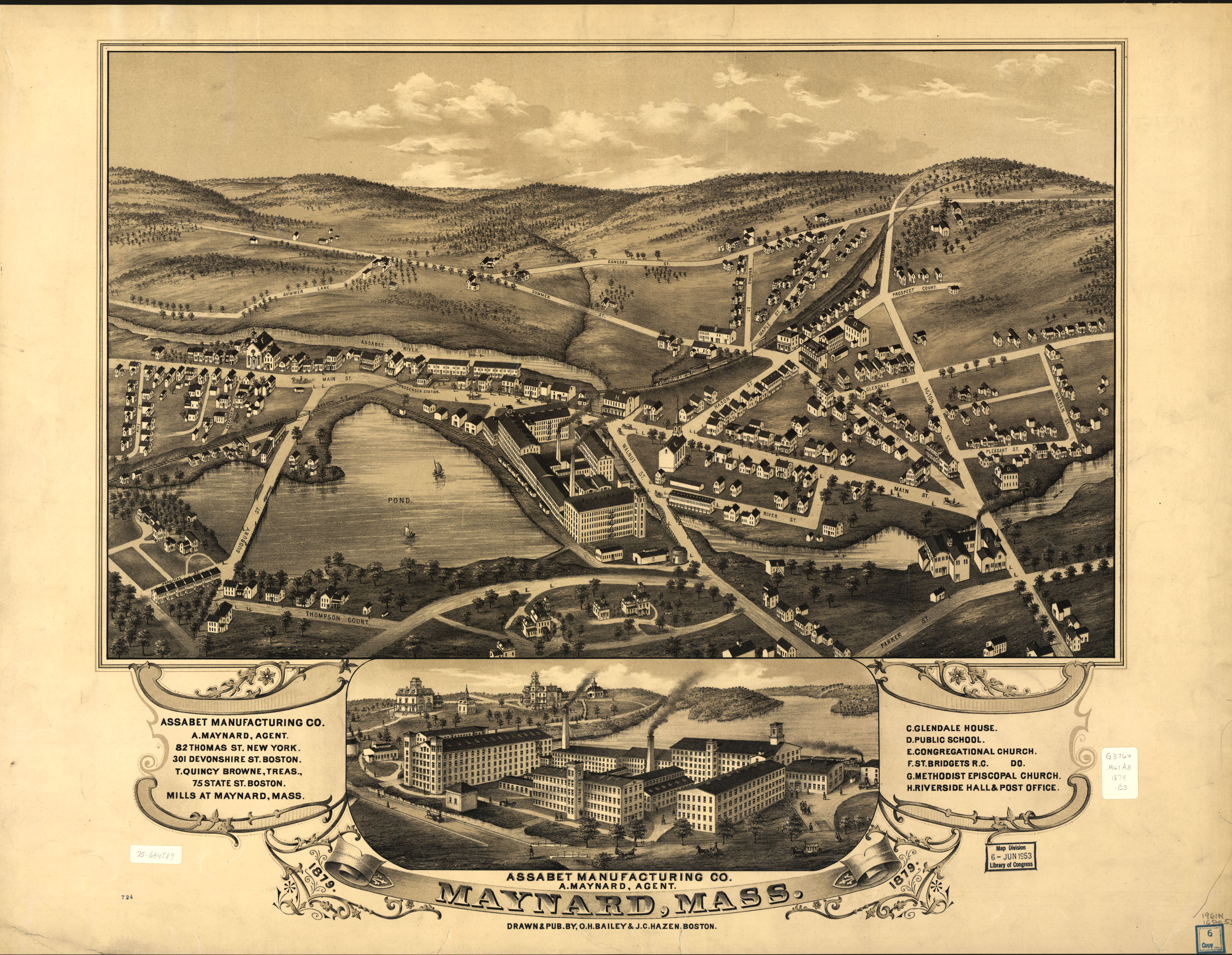
Maynard, Massachusetts

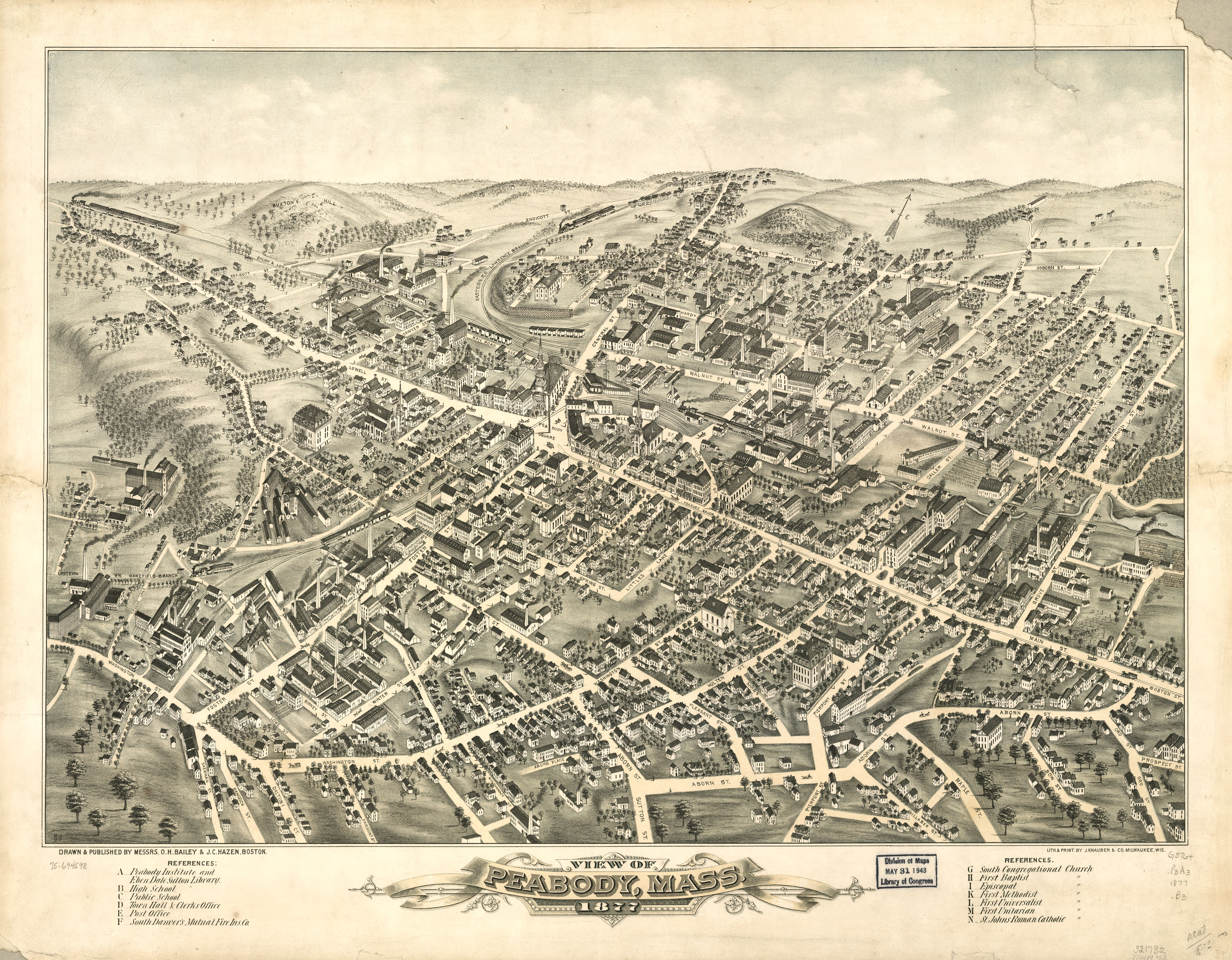
Peabody, Massachusetts

Winsted, Connecticut

New Haven, Connecticut

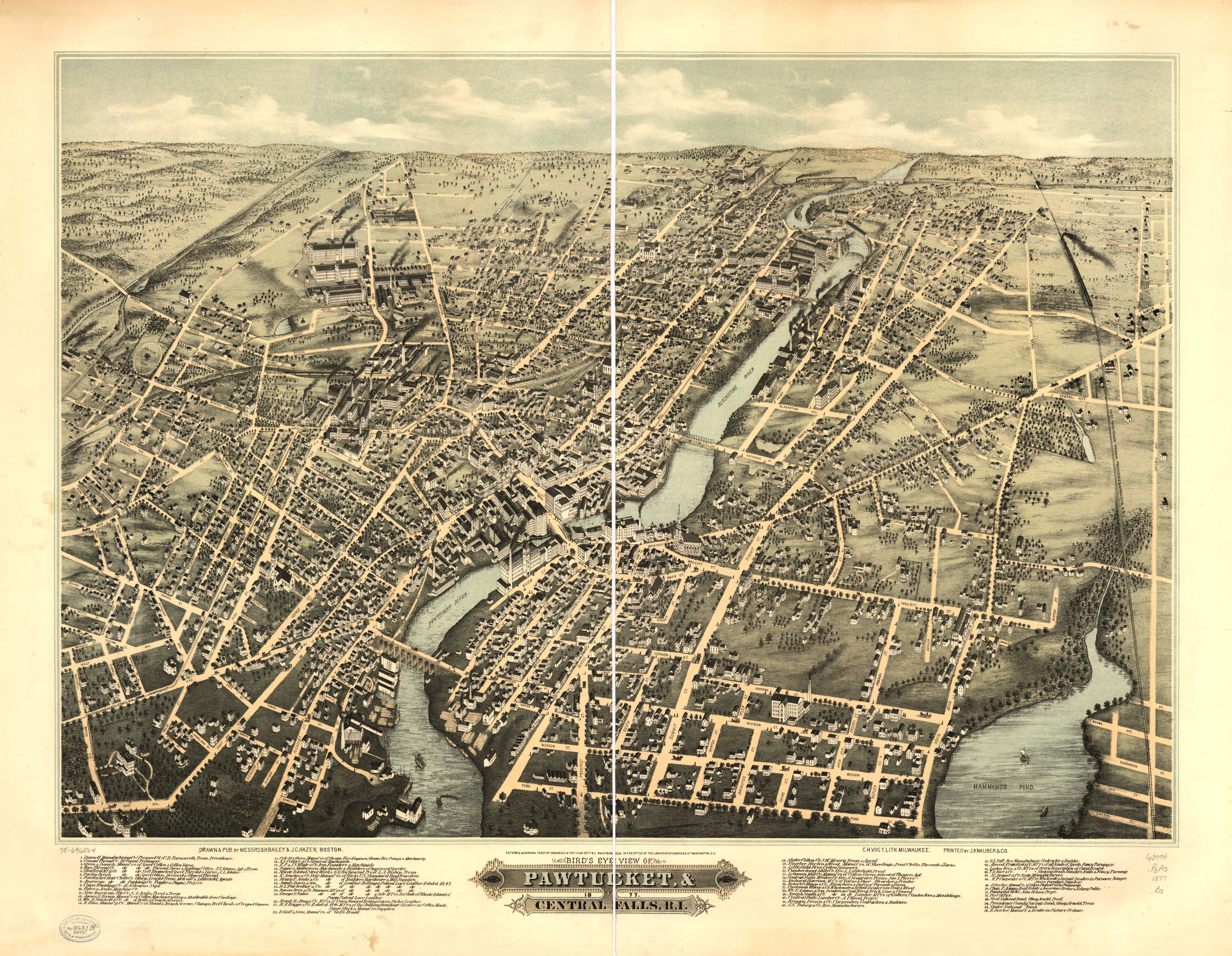
Pawtucket, Rhode Island and Central Falls, Rhode Island

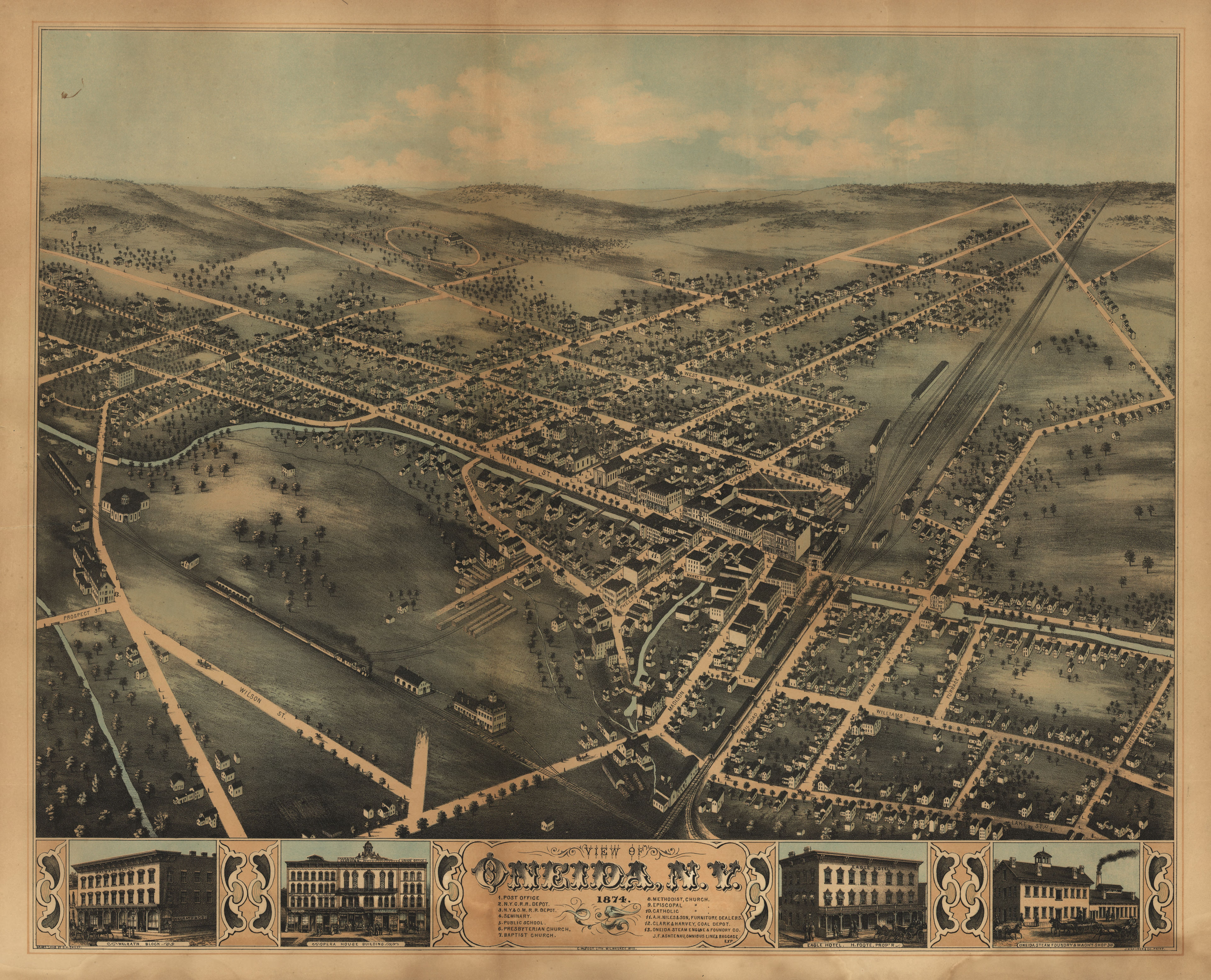
Oneida, New York

Boston

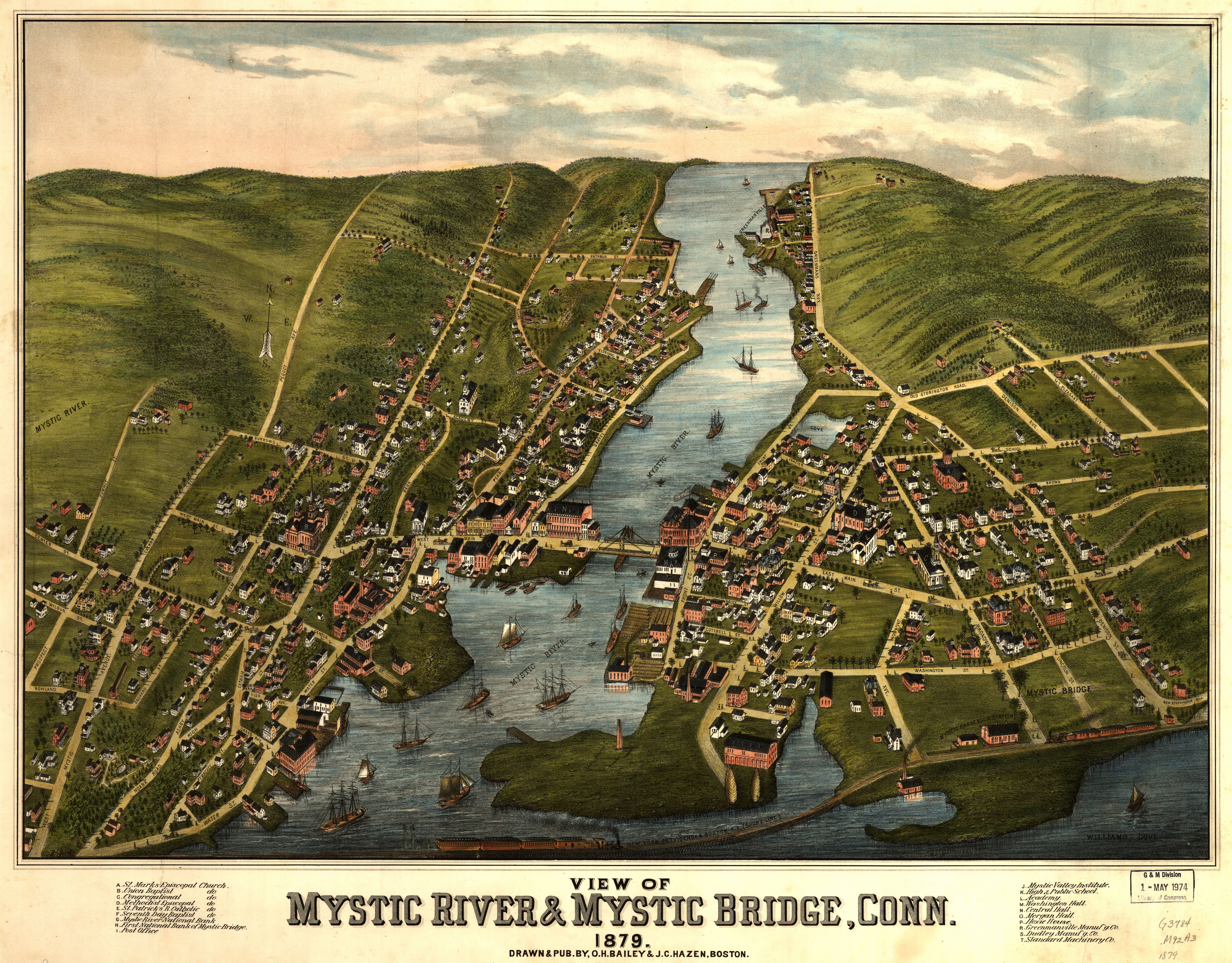
Mystic River and Mystic Bridge, Connecticut

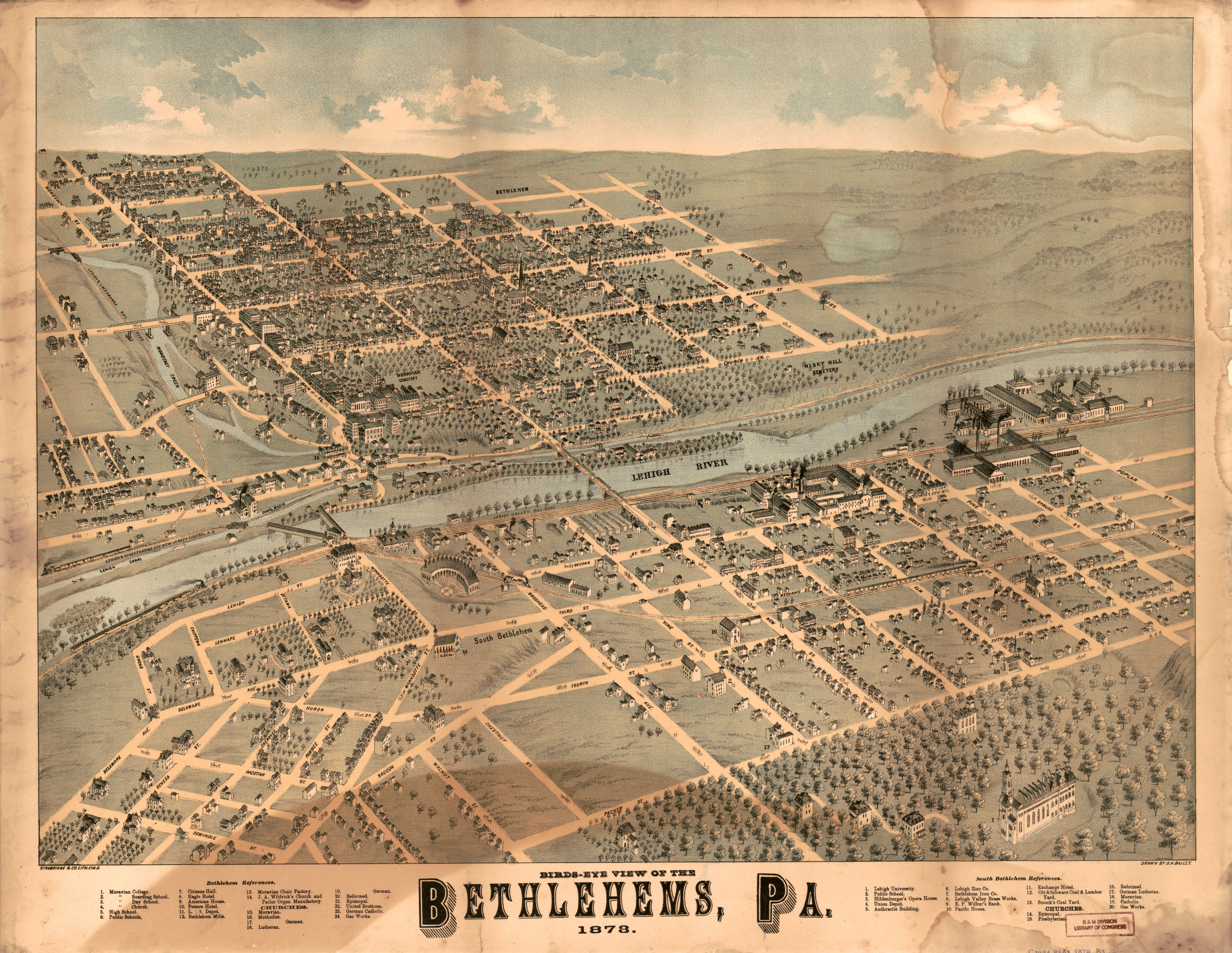
Bethlehem, Pennsylvania
