= Oakleigh =

Oakleigh may refer to:

== Places ==
=== Australia ===
- Oakleigh, Potts Point, a heritage-listed house in Sydney, New South Wales
- Oakleigh, Victoria, suburb of Melbourne, Australia
  - Oakleigh railway station
  - Oakleigh Grammar, a school
- City of Oakleigh, Victoria, Australia; a former LGA
- Electoral district of Oakleigh, an electoral district in Victoria, Australia
- Mount Oakleigh, Tasmania

=== New Zealand ===
- Oakleigh, New Zealand, locality in the North Island

=== United Kingdom ===
- Oakleigh, Glencrutchery Road, Douglas, Isle of Man, one of Isle of Man's Registered Buildings
- Oakleigh Park, Barnet, London, England; a northern suburb in Greater London
  - Oakleigh Park railway station
  - Oakleigh Park Tunnel
- Oakleigh Way, Micham, Merton, London, England

=== United States ===
- Oakleigh Garden Historic District, Mobile, Alabama
- Oakleigh Historic Complex (Mobile, Alabama), historic complex in Mobile, Alabama
- Oakleigh (Holly Springs, Mississippi), a historic mansion in Holly Springs, Mississippi

== People ==
- Oakleigh Thorne (1866−1948), U.S. businessman

=== Fictional characters ===
- Lord Evelyn Oakleigh, a fictional character from Anything Goes

== Sports ==
- Oakleigh Football Club, Oakleigh, Victoria, Australia; a VFA team
- Oakleigh District Football Club, Victoria, Australia; a SFNL team
- Oakleigh Plate, Australian horse race

== Other uses ==
- Oakleigh House School, Swansea, Wales, UK

== See also ==
- New Oakleigh Mine, Moreton, Queensland, Australia
- Oakleigh East, Victoria, Australia
- Oakleigh Racecourse railway station, Springvale, Melbourne, Victoria, Australia
- South Oakleigh Secondary College, Victoria, Australia
- Oakeley (disambiguation)
- Oakley (disambiguation)
