= 1901 in association football =

The following are the association football events of the year 1901 throughout the world.

== Events ==
- April 7 – Foundation of Brazilian football club Clube Náutico Capibaribe.
- May 16 – Uruguay and Argentina both play their first ever international match, when they meet in Montevideo. Argentina wins the contest (2–3).

== National champions ==
- Argentina: Alumni Athletic Club
- Belgium: Racing Club de Bruxelles
- England: Liverpool
- France: Standard AC Meudon
- Hungary: Budapest T.C. (first Hungarian League champions)
- Ireland: Distillery
- Italy: A.C. Milan
- Netherlands: HVV Den Haag
- Scotland:
  - Division One: Rangers
  - Scottish Cup: Hearts
- Sweden: AIK
- Switzerland: Grasshopper Zurich
- Uruguay: CURCC

== International tournaments ==
- 1901 British Home Championship (February 23 – March 30, 1901)

England

== Births ==
- January 21
  - John Coshall, English footballer (died 1975)
  - Billy Powell, English professional footballer
  - Ricardo Zamora, Spanish international footballer
- May 24 – José Nasazzi, Uruguayan international footballer
- July 26 – Umberto Caligaris, Italian international footballer (died 1940)
- September 15 – Augusto Lopes, Portuguese footballer (died-unknown)
- October 19 – Ike McGorian, English professional footballer
- November 10 – James Oakley, English professional footballer (died 1972)
- November 22 – José Leandro Andrade, Uruguayan international footballer

== Clubs founded ==
- FC Luzern
- Kickers Offenbach
- Brighton & Hove Albion F.C.
