= Blackpool F.C. league record by opponent =

Blackpool Football Club is an English association football club based in Blackpool, Lancashire, that currently competes in the EFL Championship. The club was founded in 1887 and became founder members of the Lancashire League during the 1889–90 season. The team was elected to The Football League in 1896 and remained there, with the exception of the 1898–99 season where they failed to gain re-election, until the club was promoted to the Premier League in 2010. Blackpool were relegated back to the Football League for the following season where they've remained to the present.

Through the years Blackpool have competed across the top four tiers of the English football pyramid in the First Division, Premier League, Second Division, Championship, Third Division, League One, Fourth Division and League Two. Blackpool's record against each club faced in these competitions is listed below.

The team has faced Burnley most frequently in league competition, with 116 matches as of the end of the 2020-21 season. Blackpool has won the most league matches against Leicester City, with 38 victories. The club has drawn more matches with Fulham than any other team, with 31 out of 102 league matches ending in a draw. Burnley has defeated Blackpool the most times in league competition, with 54 victories.

== Key ==
- The records include the results of matches played by Blackpool in The Football League (from 1896 to 1899, 1900 to 2010, 2011 to 2021) and the Premier League (from 2010 to 2011). Wartime matches are regarded as unofficial and are excluded, as are matches from the abandoned 1939–40 season. Test Matches, Football League play-offs, cup matches, friendly matches and matches played in the Lancashire League are not included.
- For the sake of simplicity, present-day names are used throughout: for example, results against Leicester Fosse, Newton Heath and Woolwich Arsenal are integrated into the records against Leicester City, Manchester United and Arsenal, respectively.
- † Teams with this background and symbol in the "Club" column are competing in the 2021–22 EFL Championship alongside Blackpool.
- ‡ Clubs with this background and symbol in the "Club" column are now defunct.
- P = matches played; W = matches won; D = matches drawn; L = matches lost; F = Goals scored; A = Goals conceded; GD = goal difference of total matches played; Win% = percentage of total matches won

== All-time league record ==
Statistics correct as of matches played on 9 May 2021.

Blackpool F.C. league record by opponent
Club	Home						Away						Total						GD	Win%	First	Last	Note(s)
Club	P	W	D	L	F	A	P	W	D	L	F	A	P	W	D	L	F	A	GD	Win%	First	Last	Note(s)
Accrington Stanley	4	0	3	1	1	2	4	1	2	1	4	4	8	1	5	2	5	6	−1	12.50	2016–17	2020–21	
AFC Bournemouth †	18	8	4	6	26	28	18	7	4	7	21	26	36	15	8	13	47	54	−7	41.67	1981–82	2014–15	
AFC Wimbledon	4	3	1	0	6	1	4	0	2	2	0	3	8	3	3	2	6	4	+2	37.50	2017–18	2020–21	
Aldershot ‡	7	6	0	1	21	7	7	1	1	5	9	11	14	7	1	6	30	18	+12	50.00	1981–82	1990–91	
Arsenal	37	11	13	13	51	60	37	2	8	27	34	91	74	13	21	40	85	151	−66	17.57	1896–97	2010–11	(Note: Record against Woolwich Arsenal included.)
Aston Villa	32	14	8	10	52	45	32	6	9	17	41	68	64	20	17	27	93	113	−20	31.25	1930–31	2010–11	
Barnet	4	3	1	0	12	7	4	1	1	2	2	11	8	4	2	2	14	18	−4	50.00	1991–92	2016–17	
Barnsley †	44	15	14	15	58	46	44	9	8	27	52	89	88	24	22	42	110	135	−25	27.27	1898–99	2018–19	
Birmingham City †	43	24	10	9	70	38	43	10	10	23	53	96	86	34	20	32	123	134	−11	39.53	1896–97	2014–15	(Note: Record against Small Heath; record against Birmingham included.)
Blackburn Rovers †	26	16	6	4	50	28	26	5	9	12	30	50	52	21	15	16	80	78	+2	40.38	1930–31	2017–18	
Bolton Wanderers	47	18	18	11	66	56	47	11	12	24	47	77	94	29	30	35	113	133	−20	30.85	1903–04	2019–20	
Bradford City	26	19	3	4	60	27	26	8	1	17	29	37	52	27	4	21	89	64	+25	51.92	1903–04	2018–19	
Bradford Park Avenue	13	8	3	2	25	13	13	1	3	9	14	31	26	9	6	11	39	44	−5	34.62	1908–09	1936–37	
Brentford	26	11	5	10	41	35	26	3	6	17	23	51	52	14	11	27	64	86	−22	26.92	1933–34	2014–15	
Brighton & Hove Albion	15	6	5	4	25	19	15	4	5	6	20	28	30	10	10	10	45	47	−2	33.33	1972–73	2014–15	
Bristol City †	46	21	13	12	75	48	46	10	13	23	41	72	92	31	26	35	116	120	−4	33.70	1901–02	2012–13	
Bristol Rovers	20	11	3	6	34	24	20	4	6	10	21	28	40	15	9	16	55	52	+3	37.50	1974–75	2020–21	
Burnley	58	22	17	19	73	65	58	11	12	35	55	104	116	33	29	54	128	169	−41	28.45	1897–98	2013–14	
Burton Albion	3	1	1	1	5	3	4	1	1	2	2	5	7	2	2	3	7	8	−1	28.57	2015–16	2020–21	(Note: The 2019–20 EFL League One was curtailed due to the COVID-19 pandemic, with league positions decided on a points-per-game basis. Blackpool did not get to play the second game against this team during that season and therefore the total number of games played is an odd number.)
Burton Swifts ‡	4	4	0	0	10	1	4	1	1	2	6	8	8	5	1	2	16	9	+7	62.50	1896–97	1900–01	
Burton United ‡	6	4	2	0	12	5	6	0	5	1	3	5	12	4	7	1	15	10	+5	33.33	1901–02	1906–07	
Burton Wanderers ‡	1	1	0	0	5	0	1	0	0	1	1	3	2	1	0	1	6	3	+3	50.00	1896–97	1896–97	
Bury ‡	30	11	8	11	51	37	30	7	8	15	37	55	60	18	16	26	88	92	−4	30.00	1912–13	2017–18	
Cambridge United	5	1	2	2	8	9	5	2	2	1	7	3	10	3	4	3	15	12	+3	30.00	1993–94	2016–17	
Cardiff City †	35	23	7	5	66	26	35	10	13	12	49	52	70	33	20	17	115	78	+37	47.14	1920–21	2014–15	
Carlisle United	19	12	5	2	36	15	19	7	3	9	23	27	38	19	8	11	59	42	+17	50.00	1967–68	2016–17	
Charlton Athletic	31	18	5	8	69	36	31	11	10	10	46	46	62	29	15	18	115	82	+33	46.77	1929–30	2020–21	
Chelsea	39	18	5	7	64	55	39	9	10	20	45	82	78	27	15	36	109	137	−28	34.62	1905–06	2010–11	
Cheltenham Town	4	3	1	0	10	4	4	2	1	1	5	6	8	5	2	1	15	10	+5	62.50	2000–01	2016–17	
Chester City ‡	12	5	4	3	20	14	12	4	3	5	15	16	24	9	7	8	35	30	+5	37.50	1978–79	1994–95	(Note: Record against Chester included.)
Chesterfield	34	13	14	7	36	29	34	6	12	16	34	45	68	19	26	23	70	74	−4	27.94	1900–01	2015–16	(Note: Record against Chesterfield Town included.)
Colchester United	17	6	8	3	22	18	17	3	6	8	24	31	34	9	14	11	46	49	−3	26.47	1978–79	2016–17	
Coventry City †	14	11	1	2	32	6	15	5	4	6	18	20	29	16	5	8	50	26	+24	55.17	1919–20	2019–20	
Crawley Town	1	0	1	0	0	0	1	0	0	1	0	1	2	0	1	1	0	1	−1	0.00	2016–17	2016–17	
Crewe Alexandra	14	7	3	4	27	14	14	4	3	7	18	24	28	11	6	11	45	38	+7	39.29	1981–82	2020–21	
Crystal Palace	14	9	3	2	27	12	14	4	5	5	16	21	28	13	8	7	43	33	+10	46.43	1921–22	2012–13	
Darlington	10	5	3	2	12	7	10	5	3	2	19	11	20	10	6	4	31	18	+13	50.00	1925–26	2000–01	
Darwen ‡	3	3	0	0	8	0	3	2	0	1	6	5	6	5	0	1	14	5	+9	83.33	1896–97	1898–99	
Derby County †	33	17	8	8	56	38	33	4	8	21	32	76	66	21	16	29	88	114	−26	31.82	1907–08	2014–15	
Doncaster Rovers	23	15	5	3	52	24	24	9	7	8	34	29	47	24	12	11	86	53	+33	51.06	1901–02	2020–21	
Everton	24	10	6	8	40	25	24	5	6	13	20	48	48	15	12	21	60	73	−13	31.25	1931–32	2010–11	
Exeter City	8	6	2	0	13	1	8	1	3	4	4	10	16	7	5	4	17	11	+6	43.75	1978–79	2016–17	
Fleetwood Town	5	4	1	0	8	3	5	1	3	1	3	3	10	5	4	1	11	6	+5	50.00	2015–16	2020–21	
Fulham †	51	26	14	11	88	54	51	10	17	24	45	75	102	36	31	35	133	129	+4	35.29	1907–08	2014–15	
Gainsborough Trinity	15	7	6	2	29	11	15	2	3	10	9	31	30	9	9	12	38	42	−4	30.00	1896–97	1911–12	
Gillingham	20	10	7	3	40	24	20	4	7	9	26	31	40	14	14	12	66	55	+11	35.00	1978–79	2020–21	
Glossop North End	16	9	6	1	31	13	16	4	4	8	16	33	32	13	10	9	47	46	+1	40.63	1898–99	1914–15	(Note: Record against Glossop included.)
Grimsby Town	31	15	7	9	69	50	31	5	10	16	30	57	62	20	17	25	99	107	−8	32.26	1897–98	2016–17	
Halifax Town	7	4	2	1	17	3	7	3	1	3	9	10	14	7	3	4	26	13	+13	50.00	1981–82	2000–01	
Hartlepool United	12	6	3	3	21	14	12	5	3	4	15	13	24	11	6	7	36	27	+9	45.83	1981–82	2016–17	
Hereford United	7	7	0	0	18	3	7	2	3	2	8	8	14	9	3	2	26	11	+15	64.29	1976–77	1991–92	
Huddersfield Town †	39	18	14	7	67	44	39	9	9	21	42	80	78	27	23	28	109	124	−15	34.62	1910–11	2014–15	
Hull City †	49	19	17	13	85	61	49	12	13	24	52	73	98	31	30	37	137	134	+3	31.63	1905–06	2020–21	
Ipswich Town	14	5	4	5	19	17	14	0	6	8	17	29	28	5	10	13	36	46	−10	17.86	1961–62	2020–21	
Kidderminster Harriers	1	1	0	0	5	1	1	1	0	0	4	1	2	2	0	0	9	2	+7	100.00	2000–01	2000–01	
Leeds City ‡	11	6	1	4	18	16	11	2	2	7	9	16	22	8	3	11	27	32	−5	36.36	1905–06	1919–20	
Leeds United	22	11	6	5	39	28	22	3	7	12	23	43	44	14	13	17	62	71	−9	31.82	1920–21	2014–15	
Leicester City	47	24	14	9	97	59	47	14	7	26	55	95	94	38	21	35	152	154	−2	40.43	1896–97	2013–14	(Note: Record against Leicester Fosse included.)
Leyton Orient	35	21	10	4	72	25	35	11	7	17	31	41	70	32	17	21	103	66	+37	45.71	1905–06	2016–17	(Note: Record against Clapton Orient included; record against Orient included.)
Lincoln City	26	21	2	3	66	16	26	10	8	8	29	27	52	31	10	11	95	43	+52	59.62	1896–97	2020–21	
Liverpool	21	9	4	8	33	26	21	6	5	10	33	48	42	15	9	18	66	74	−8	35.71	1904–05	2010–11	
Loughborough ‡	3	3	0	0	10	2	3	2	0	1	6	5	6	5	0	1	16	7	+9	83.33	1896–97	1898–99	
Luton Town †	22	11	5	6	35	23	22	4	4	14	23	41	44	15	9	20	58	64	−6	34.09	1897–98	2018–19	
Macclesfield Town ‡	2	2	0	0	4	2	2	1	0	1	2	2	4	3	0	1	6	4	+2	75.00	1998–99	2000–01	
Maidstone United (old) ‡	2	0	2	0	3	3	2	0	2	0	1	1	4	0	4	0	4	4	+0	0.00	1990–91	1991–92	
Manchester City	30	6	14	10	46	53	30	10	4	16	50	63	60	16	18	26	96	116	−20	26.67	1896–97	2010–11	
Manchester United	41	14	9	18	62	69	41	6	8	27	36	87	82	20	17	45	98	156	−58	24.39	1896–97	2010–11	(Note: Record against Newton Heath included.)
Mansfield Town	16	7	5	4	26	19	16	4	9	3	19	18	32	11	14	7	45	37	+8	34.38	1977–78	2016–17	
Middlesbrough †	31	13	10	8	52	37	31	6	7	18	40	70	62	19	17	26	92	107	−15	30.65	1900–01	2014–15	
Millwall †	24	13	7	4	39	25	24	3	10	11	21	33	48	16	17	15	60	58	+2	33.33	1928–29	2015–16	
Milton Keynes Dons	5	4	0	1	6	5	4	1	1	3	5	10	10	5	1	4	11	15	−4	50.00	2004–05	2020–21	
Morecambe	1	1	0	0	3	1	1	0	0	1	1	2	2	1	0	1	4	3	+1	50.00	2016–17	2016–17	
Nelson	1	0	1	0	1	1	1	1	0	0	3	2	2	1	1	0	4	3	+1	50.00	1923–24	1923–24	
New Brighton Tower ‡	2	0	0	2	2	4	2	0	1	1	0	4	4	0	1	3	2	6	−4	0.00	1898–99	1900–01	
Newcastle United	26	14	5	7	61	34	26	9	3	14	34	48	52	23	8	21	95	82	+13	44.23	1896–97	2010–11	
Newport County	4	1	2	1	7	6	4	1	2	1	6	6	8	2	4	2	13	12	+1	25.00	1980–81	2016–17	
Northampton Town	17	13	2	2	33	13	17	6	4	7	25	23	34	19	6	9	58	36	+22	55.88	1965–66	2020–21	
Norwich City	11	5	1	5	13	16	11	5	2	4	13	19	22	10	3	9	26	35	−9	45.45	1934–35	2014–15	
Nottingham Forest †	41	20	11	10	79	55	41	5	16	20	23	62	82	25	27	30	102	117	−15	30.49	1906–07	2014–15	
Notts County	29	14	9	6	46	30	29	9	6	14	35	46	58	23	15	20	81	76	+5	39.66	1896–97	2016–17	
Oldham Athletic	27	12	9	6	39	24	27	7	3	17	30	53	54	19	12	23	69	77	−8	35.19	1907–08	2017–18	
Oxford United	17	10	5	2	22	10	18	6	3	9	18	20	35	16	8	11	40	30	+10	45.71	1968–69	2020–21	
Peterborough United †	21	10	5	6	39	27	20	6	4	10	19	32	41	16	9	16	58	59	−1	39.02	1978–79	2020–21	
Plymouth Argyle	26	8	13	5	34	26	26	13	3	10	39	32	52	21	16	15	73	58	+15	40.38	1933–34	2020–21	
Port Vale	35	20	3	12	64	51	35	9	7	19	40	63	70	29	10	31	104	114	−10	41.43	1898–99	2015–16	(Note: Record against Burslem Port Vale included.)
Portsmouth	36	17	13	6	64	40	35	12	10	13	45	53	71	29	23	19	109	93	+16	40.85	1924–25	2020–21	
Preston North End †	43	17	11	15	72	61	43	13	7	23	69	79	86	30	18	38	141	140	+1	34.88	1901–02	2009–10	
Queens Park Rangers †	11	2	4	5	10	16	11	1	3	7	8	27	22	3	7	12	18	43	−25	13.64	1967–68	2013–14	
Reading †	20	10	5	5	34	22	20	2	6	12	12	35	40	12	11	17	46	57	−11	30.00	1926–27	2014–15	
Rochdale	11	5	4	2	14	8	12	1	3	8	8	19	23	6	7	10	22	26	−4	26.09	1981–82	2020–21	
Rotherham County ‡	4	3	0	1	9	3	4	3	0	1	5	2	8	6	0	2	14	5	+9	75.00	1919–20	1922–23	
Rotherham United	19	7	5	7	28	21	19	6	2	11	19	30	38	13	7	18	47	51	−4	34.21	1967–68	2019–20	
Rushden & Diamonds ‡	1	0	0	1	2	3	1	0	1	0	0	0	2	0	1	1	2	3	−1	0.00	2003–04	2003–04	
Scarborough	2	1	1	0	4	2	2	2	0	0	3	1	4	3	1	0	7	3	+4	75.00	1990–91	1991–92	
Scunthorpe United	14	12	0	2	38	12	14	3	5	6	15	17	28	15	5	8	53	29	+24	53.57	1981–82	2018–19	
Sheffield United †	30	13	8	9	45	40	30	6	7	17	41	59	60	19	15	26	86	99	−13	31.67	1930–31	2015–16	
Sheffield Wednesday	37	13	8	16	48	51	37	9	5	23	37	79	74	22	13	39	85	130	−45	29.73	1920–21	2014–15	
Shrewsbury Town	11	3	3	5	13	11	11	3	3	5	8	10	22	6	6	10	21	21	+0	27.27	1978–79	2020–21	
South Shields ‡	9	7	1	1	27	8	9	2	2	5	12	19	18	9	3	6	39	27	+12	50.00	1919–20	1927–28	
Southampton	21	15	2	4	46	23	21	2	6	13	31	52	42	17	8	17	77	75	+2	40.48	1922–23	2011–12	
Southend United	12	6	4	2	20	13	12	5	0	7	18	21	24	11	4	9	38	34	+4	45.83	1978–79	2019–20	
Stevenage	1	1	0	0	1	0	1	1	0	0	2	0	2	2	0	0	3	0	+3	100.00	2016–17	2016–17	
Stockport County	33	17	8	8	51	32	33	9	10	14	37	46	66	26	18	22	88	78	+10	39.39	1900–01	2004–05	
Stoke City †	31	11	10	10	44	38	31	9	9	13	37	54	62	20	19	23	81	92	−11	32.26	1907–08	2010–11	(Note: Record against Stoke included.)
Sunderland	30	12	9	9	51	37	31	7	9	15	37	49	61	19	18	24	88	86	+2	31.15	1930–31	2020–21	
Swansea City †	21	10	10	1	38	20	21	4	6	11	27	41	42	14	16	12	65	61	+4	33.33	1925–26	2009–10	(Note: Record against Swansea Town included.)
Swindon Town	19	10	8	1	30	14	19	4	9	6	25	25	38	14	17	7	55	39	+16	36.84	1969–70	2020–21	
Torquay United	7	6	1	0	17	4	7	2	1	4	9	10	14	8	2	4	26	14	+12	57.14	1981–82	2004–05	
Tottenham Hotspur	26	7	9	10	32	34	26	5	5	16	35	71	52	12	14	26	67	105	−38	23.08	1908–09	2010–11	
Tranmere Rovers	13	4	2	7	15	18	13	1	5	7	13	26	26	5	7	14	28	44	−16	19.23	1978–79	2019–20	
Walsall	21	12	3	6	33	26	21	1	8	12	19	44	42	13	11	18	52	70	−18	30.95	1896–97	2018–19	
Watford	12	3	6	3	15	14	12	4	3	5	18	30	24	7	9	8	33	44	−11	29.17	1969–70	2014–15	
West Bromwich Albion †	40	20	6	14	65	50	40	10	6	24	51	94	80	30	12	38	116	144	−28	37.50	1901–02	2010–11	
West Ham United	22	12	4	6	42	29	22	2	7	13	21	41	44	14	11	19	63	70	−7	31.82	1919–20	2011–12	
Wigan Athletic	18	6	4	8	22	27	18	6	4	8	23	25	36	12	8	16	45	52	−7	33.33	1981–82	2020–21	
Wimbledon (old) ‡	2	1	1	0	4	1	2	1	0	1	2	6	4	2	1	1	6	7	−1	50.00	1979–80	1982–83	
Wolverhampton Wanderers	50	23	10	17	85	65	50	11	9	30	58	97	100	34	19	47	143	162	−19	34.00	1906–07	2014–15	
Wrexham	14	9	3	2	32	12	14	7	5	2	22	18	28	16	8	4	54	30	+24	57.14	1983–84	2004–05	
Wycombe Wanderers	12	2	7	3	13	15	12	5	4	3	17	10	24	7	11	6	30	25	+5	29.17	1994–95	2019–20	
Yeovil Town	4	1	2	1	6	5	4	2	1	1	5	2	8	3	3	2	11	7	+4	37.50	2005–06	2016–17	
York City	17	9	3	5	23	23	17	5	4	8	16	22	34	14	7	13	39	45	−6	41.18	1974–75	2000–01	
Total	2391	1150	632	600	4068	2730	2394	580	605	1210	2710	4176	4786	1730	1237	1819	6778	6903	-125	36.15	1896–97	2020–21	
