= Billy Powell (disambiguation) =

Billy Powell was an American musician of southern rock band Lynyrd Skynyrd.

Billy Powell may also refer to:

- Billy Powell (footballer)
- Osceola, Seminole leader (1804–1838)
