= McGorian =

McGorian is a surname. Notable people with the surname include:

- Elizabeth McGorian, Zimbabwean ballerina
- Ike McGorian (1901–?), English footballer

== See also ==
- McGorman
