= 1900–01 Football League =

13th season of the Football League

The Football League
- Season: 1900–01
- Champions: Liverpool
- Relegated: Walsall
- Folded: New Brighton Tower
- New Clubs in League: Blackpool, Stockport County

The 1900–01 season was the 13th season of The Football League.

== Final league tables ==
Beginning in the 1894–95 season, clubs finishing level on points were separated according to goal average (goals scored divided by goals conceded). In case one or more teams had the same goal difference, this system favoured those teams who had conceded fewer goals. The goal average system was eventually scrapped beginning with the 1976–77 season.

During the first six seasons of the league, (up to the 1893–94 season), re-election process concerned the clubs which finished in the bottom four of the league. From the 1894–95 season and until the 1920–21 season the re-election process was required of the clubs which finished in the bottom three of the league.

== First Division ==
First Division
- Season: 1900–01
- Champions: Liverpool; 1st English title
- Relegated: Preston North End; West Bromwich Albion
- Matches: 306
- Goals: 855 (2.79 per match)
- Top goalscorer: Steve Bloomer (23 goals)
- Biggest home win: Aston Villa 7–1 Manchester City (1 December 1900)
- Biggest away win: West Bromwich Albion 1–6 Nottingham Forest (20 October 1900)
- Highest scoring: Derby County 4–5 Wolverhampton Wanderers (22 September 1900); West Bromwich Albion 7–2 Bolton Wanderers (8 December 1900); Sunderland 7–2 Wolverhampton Wanderers (12 January 1901)
- Longest winning run: 5 matches Nottingham Forest
- Longest unbeaten run: 12 matches Liverpool; Nottingham Forest
- Longest losing run: 6 matches Preston North End
- Highest attendance: 50,000; Everton 1–1 Liverpool (22 September 1900)
- Lowest attendance: 1,050; West Bromwich Albion 0–2 Sheffield United (30 April 1901)
- Average attendance: 11,151

Pos	Team	Pld	W	D	L	GF	GA	GAv	Pts	Relegation
1	Liverpool (C)	34	19	7	8	59	35	1.686	45	
2	Sunderland	34	15	13	6	57	26	2.192	43	
3	Notts County	34	18	4	12	54	46	1.174	40	
4	Nottingham Forest	34	16	7	11	53	36	1.472	39	
5	Bury	34	16	7	11	53	37	1.432	39	
6	Newcastle United	34	14	10	10	42	37	1.135	38	
7	Everton	34	16	5	13	55	42	1.310	37	
8	The Wednesday	34	13	10	11	52	42	1.238	36	
9	Blackburn Rovers	34	12	9	13	39	47	0.830	33	
10	Bolton Wanderers	34	13	7	14	39	55	0.709	33	
11	Manchester City	34	13	6	15	48	58	0.828	32	
12	Derby County	34	12	7	15	55	42	1.310	31	
13	Wolverhampton Wanderers	34	9	13	12	39	55	0.709	31	
14	Sheffield United	34	12	7	15	35	52	0.673	31	
15	Aston Villa	34	10	10	14	45	51	0.882	30	
16	Stoke	34	11	5	18	46	57	0.807	27	
17	Preston North End (R)	34	9	7	18	49	75	0.653	25	Relegation to the Second Division
18	West Bromwich Albion (R)	34	7	8	19	35	62	0.565	22	Relegation to the Second Division

Source: World Football
Rules for classification: 1) Points; 2) Goal average; 3) Goals scored
(C) Champions; (R) Relegated

=== Results ===
Home \ Away	AST	BLB	BOL	BRY	DER	EVE	LIV	MCI	NEW	NOT	NTC	PNE	SHU	STK	SUN	WED	WBA	WOL
Aston Villa		3–3	3–0	1–0	2–1	1–2	0–2	7–1	2–2	2–1	1–2	4–0	0–0	2–0	2–2	2–1	0–1	0–0
Blackburn Rovers	2–2		2–0	0–2	1–0	2–1	3–1	1–0	0–0	1–3	0–2	3–1	1–0	3–2	0–1	2–2	1–1	2–0
Bolton Wanderers	1–0	1–0		3–2	0–1	1–0	1–0	0–0	3–2	4–2	0–1	1–1	0–0	1–0	0–0	1–1	3–2	1–0
Bury	3–1	0–1	3–0		2–1	3–0	0–0	4–0	1–0	0–1	1–0	2–1	1–1	3–2	0–0	2–0	6–1	0–1
Derby County	3–0	4–0	4–2	5–2		0–1	2–3	2–0	1–1	0–0	2–1	0–0	4–0	4–1	1–1	3–1	4–0	4–5
Everton	2–1	0–0	2–3	3–3	2–0		1–1	5–2	0–1	4–1	0–1	4–1	3–1	3–0	1–0	1–1	1–0	5–1
Liverpool	5–1	3–0	2–1	1–0	0–0	1–2		3–1	3–0	2–0	1–0	3–2	1–2	3–1	1–2	1–1	5–0	1–0
Manchester City	4–0	1–3	1–1	1–0	2–0	1–0	3–4		2–1	1–0	2–0	3–1	2–1	2–0	1–1	2–2	1–0	3–2
Newcastle United	3–0	1–0	3–0	0–0	2–1	1–0	1–1	2–1		0–0	2–0	3–5	3–0	2–1	0–2	0–0	1–1	3–1
Nottingham Forest	3–1	0–1	3–0	1–1	1–0	2–1	0–0	4–2	1–2		5–0	4–1	2–0	1–1	0–0	1–0	2–3	2–1
Notts County	2–0	2–1	3–1	1–0	2–1	3–2	3–0	0–0	3–1	1–0		6–1	2–4	2–4	2–2	2–0	1–0	4–1
Preston North End	0–2	4–1	1–3	3–1	3–2	1–2	2–2	0–4	0–1	1–1	0–1		3–1	4–2	1–1	3–2	2–3	1–1
Sheffield United	2–2	2–1	0–2	0–3	2–1	2–1	0–2	1–1	2–0	0–1	4–2	2–1		0–4	2–0	1–0	1–1	1–1
Stoke	0–0	2–0	2–1	1–2	0–1	0–2	1–2	2–1	2–0	0–3	1–1	5–0	0–1		0–0	2–1	2–0	3–0
Sunderland	0–0	2–0	5–1	4–1	2–1	2–0	0–1	3–0	1–1	0–1	1–1	3–1	3–0	6–1		1–0	3–0	7–2
The Wednesday	3–2	1–1	1–0	1–2	2–1	3–1	3–2	4–1	2–2	4–1	4–1	0–1	1–0	4–0	1–0		2–1	2–0
West Bromwich Albion	0–1	1–1	7–2	1–2	1–1	1–2	0–1	3–2	0–1	1–6	1–0	0–1	0–2	2–2	1–0	1–1		1–2
Wolverhampton Wanderers	0–0	2–2	1–1	1–1	0–0	1–1	2–1	1–0	1–0	1–0	3–2	2–2	3–0	0–2	2–2	1–1	0–0	

Legend: Blue = home team win; Yellow = draw; Red = away team win.

=== Maps ===
Locations of the Football League First Division teams

== Second Division ==
Second Division
- Season: 1900–01
- Champions: Grimsby Town
- Promoted: Grimsby Town; Small Heath
- Relegated: Walsall
- Matches: 306
- Goals: 819 (2.68 per match)
- Top goalscorer: Andrew Swann (18 goals)
- Biggest home win: Small Heath 10–1 Blackpool (2 March 1901)
- Biggest away win: Walsall 1–5 Burton Swifts (24 September 1900)
- Highest scoring: Middlesbrough 9–2 Gainsborough Trinity (9 March 1901)
- Longest winning run: 5 matches Burnley; Grimsby Town; Middlesbrough
- Longest unbeaten run: 17 matches Grimsby Town
- Longest losing run: 5 matches Barnsley; Chesterfield; Gainsborough Trinity; Newton Heath

Pos	Team	Pld	W	D	L	GF	GA	GAv	Pts	Promotion or relegation
1	Grimsby Town (C, P)	34	20	9	5	60	33	1.818	49	Promotion to the First Division
2	Small Heath (P)	34	19	10	5	57	24	2.375	48	Promotion to the First Division
3	Burnley	34	20	4	10	53	29	1.828	44	
4	New Brighton Tower	34	17	8	9	57	38	1.500	42	Dissolved
5	Glossop	34	15	8	11	51	33	1.545	38	
6	Middlesbrough	34	15	7	12	50	40	1.250	37	
7	Woolwich Arsenal	34	15	6	13	39	35	1.114	36	
8	Lincoln City	34	13	7	14	43	39	1.103	33	
9	Burslem Port Vale	34	11	11	12	45	47	0.957	33	
10	Newton Heath	34	14	4	16	42	38	1.105	32	
11	Leicester Fosse	34	11	10	13	39	37	1.054	32	
12	Blackpool	34	12	7	15	33	58	0.569	31	
13	Gainsborough Trinity	34	10	10	14	45	60	0.750	30	
14	Chesterfield Town	34	9	10	15	46	58	0.793	28	
15	Barnsley	34	11	5	18	47	60	0.783	27	
16	Walsall (R)	34	7	13	14	40	56	0.714	27	Failed re-election and demoted
17	Stockport County	34	11	3	20	38	68	0.559	25	Re-elected
18	Burton Swifts	34	8	4	22	34	66	0.515	20	Re-elected

Rules for classification: 1) Points; 2) Goal average; 3) Goals scored
(C) Champions; (P) Promoted; (R) Relegated

=== Results ===
Home \ Away	BAR	BLP	BUR	BPV	BRS	CHF	GAI	GLP	GRI	LEI	LIN	MID	NBR	NWH	SMH	STP	WAL	ARS
Barnsley		0–1	2–1	1–3	3–2	4–1	1–3	2–2	2–3	1–0	0–0	3–1	1–1	6–2	1–2	2–0	2–1	3–0
Blackpool	1–1		0–1	2–1	2–0	1–1	1–1	0–0	0–1	1–0	2–0	3–0	1–2	1–2	0–0	3–0	1–0	1–1
Burnley	4–0	4–0		1–0	2–1	5–1	2–1	5–1	3–0	0–0	1–0	2–0	2–1	1–0	1–0	3–1	0–0	3–0
Burslem Port Vale	3–2	4–0	1–0		4–0	5–1	1–1	0–0	0–0	0–0	2–0	0–2	1–3	2–0	2–2	0–1	2–2	1–0
Burton Swifts	1–1	1–2	1–0	0–2		0–4	1–0	1–3	1–2	0–1	0–0	0–0	1–0	3–1	0–2	3–2	2–1	1–0
Chesterfield	1–2	2–0	1–3	1–1	2–0		2–2	0–1	3–3	1–0	2–0	2–3	0–1	2–1	1–1	4–2	1–1	0–1
Gainsborough Trinity	4–2	1–3	3–0	2–1	2–1	2–3		1–1	0–1	0–0	1–1	1–1	4–1	0–1	1–2	2–0	1–0	1–0
Glossop	2–1	6–0	0–1	1–2	3–0	1–1	3–1		0–0	3–1	2–0	2–0	0–1	1–0	2–0	6–0	2–0	0–1
Grimsby Town	1–0	2–0	2–1	6–1	5–2	5–2	0–0	1–0		4–1	4–0	2–0	5–2	2–0	1–1	5–1	0–0	1–0
Leicester Fosse	2–0	3–1	1–1	0–0	5–2	1–3	1–0	1–2	4–0		0–2	1–0	1–1	1–0	1–1	2–2	5–0	1–0
Lincoln City	3–0	3–0	2–0	2–2	2–1	2–0	6–0	1–1	0–1	1–0		1–2	2–0	2–0	3–1	4–0	2–0	3–3
Middlesbrough	3–0	3–1	0–0	4–0	3–1	2–0	9–2	2–2	0–0	2–1	2–0		2–1	1–2	0–1	2–0	2–1	1–1
New Brighton Tower	2–0	0–0	2–1	1–1	3–1	1–1	3–2	1–0	5–0	0–0	2–0	3–1		2–0	0–0	3–0	5–1	1–0
Newton Heath	1–0	4–0	0–1	4–0	1–1	1–0	0–0	3–0	1–0	2–3	4–1	4–0	1–0		0–1	3–1	1–1	1–0
Small Heath	3–1	10–1	0–1	2–1	2–0	0–0	6–0	1–0	2–1	0–0	2–0	2–1	4–0	1–0		2–0	2–1	2–1
Stockport County	2–1	0–1	3–2	1–1	2–0	3–1	1–2	1–3	0–1	3–1	1–0	0–1	0–5	1–0	0–0		4–1	3–1
Walsall	3–0	1–2	2–0	2–1	1–5	2–2	3–3	2–1	0–0	2–0	3–0	0–0	3–3	1–1	2–2	1–3		1–0
Woolwich Arsenal	1–2	3–1	3–1	3–0	3–1	1–0	2–1	2–0	1–1	2–1	0–0	1–0	2–1	2–1	1–0	2–0	1–1	

Updated to match(es) played on unknown. Source: Ian Laschke: Rothmans Book of Football League Records 1888–89 to 1978–79. Macdonald and Jane’s, London & Sydney, 1980.
Legend: Blue = home team win; Yellow = draw; Red = away team win.

=== Maps ===
Locations of the Football League Second Division teams

== Attendances ==
=== Division One ===
No.	Club	Average
1	Aston Villa FC	17,530
2	Manchester City FC	17,135
3	Everton FC	16,855
4	Newcastle United FC	15,575
5	Liverpool FC	15,195
6	Sheffield United FC	14,110
7	Sunderland AFC	11,695
8	West Bromwich Albion FC	10,925
9	Nottingham Forest FC	9,815
10	Bolton Wanderers FC	9,700
11	The Wednesday	9,600
12	Notts County FC	8,945
13	Derby County FC	7,995
14	Stoke City FC	7,650
15	Bury FC	7,375
16	Wolverhampton Wanderers FC	6,365
17	Blackburn Rovers FC	6,225
18	Preston North End FC	6,170

== See also ==
- 1900–01 in English football
- 1900 in association football
- 1901 in association football
