= 1981–82 Football League =

83rd season of the Football League

The Football League
- Season: 1981–82
- Champions: Liverpool

The 1981–82 season was the 83rd completed season (84th overall) of The Football League. This was the first league season with three points for win.

== Overview ==
Three points for a win was introduced for the first time in England. Champions Aston Villa finished a disappointing 11th but made up for this by triumphing in the European Cup at the first attempt.

Liverpool made up for the previous season's slip in league form by winning the league championship for the 13th time in their history, fighting off competition from Ipswich Town, Manchester United and Spurs. Liverpool also won the Football League Cup for the second season in succession. The league triumph was made all the more significant by the fact that they had occupied 10th place on Christmas Day.

Their season of triumph was overshadowed, however, by the death of legendary former manager Bill Shankly, 68, following a heart attack in late September.

Middlesbrough and Wolves were relegated as financial problems at both clubs began to mount. They were joined by Leeds United, only seven years after playing in the European cup final.

West Bromwich Albion felt the loss of manager Ron Atkinson and key players Bryan Robson and Remi Moses as they slumped to 19th in the league and narrowly avoided relegation. This was just the beginning of a sharp decline for a club who three seasons earlier had reached the UEFA Cup quarter-finals and almost won the league title.

Swansea City were tipped for relegation by most observers as they reached the First Division for the first time in their history, having just completed their third promotion in four seasons. But John Toshack's men had a brilliant first game in the top flight, crushing Leeds United 5-1 and setting the tone for a season which would end with Leeds going down. Swansea, meanwhile, were the most unlikely title contenders, topping the league at several stages of the season before finishing sixth in the final table.

Manchester United paid a British record fee of £1.75million for West Bromwich Albion's 24-year-old England midfielder Bryan Robson. Robson's record-breaking move reflected on how the size of transfer fees had risen dramatically in a relatively short period of time. Less than four years earlier, the British record fee had been the £516,000 that West Bromwich Albion had paid for David Mills. In such a short amount of time, the British record had more than tripled.

Everton, who had struggled in the league for the past few seasons, turned to their former player Howard Kendall and appointed him as manager in hope of restoring the club to its former glory.

== First Division ==
First Division
- Season: 1981–82
- Champions: Liverpool; 13th English title
- Relegated: Leeds United; Middlesbrough; Wolverhampton Wanderers
- European Cup: Liverpool; Aston Villa
- Cup Winners' Cup: Tottenham Hotspur; Swansea City
- UEFA Cup: Ipswich Town; Manchester United; Arsenal; Southampton
- Matches: 462
- Goals: 1,173 (2.54 per match)
- Top goalscorer: Kevin Keegan (26 goals)
- Biggest home win: Manchester United 5–0 Wolverhampton Wanderers (3 October 1981); Tottenham Hotspur 6–1 Wolverhampton Wanderers (6 February 1982); Coventry City 6–1 Sunderland (27 April 1982)
- Biggest away win: Manchester City 0–5 Liverpool (10 April 1982)
- Highest scoring: Southampton 5–5 Coventry City (4 May 1982)
- Longest winning run: 11 matches Liverpool
- Longest unbeaten run: 16 matches Liverpool
- Longest losing run: 8 matches Wolverhampton Wanderers

The First Division title race saw many teams take the lead throughout the season, including traditional favourites like Manchester United, Manchester City, Tottenham Hotspur and Arsenal, as well as thriving Ipswich Town and Southampton, and most incredibly a Swansea City side who had never been in the First Division before, and who had been in the Fourth Division just a few seasons previously. In the end, however, it was Liverpool who clinched the title after a surge in the second half of the campaign which took them from mid table at Christmas to clinching the title on the final day of the season. They also retained the League Cup. Defending champions Aston Villa only finished mid-table but finished the season as European Cup winners, three months after Ron Saunders stood down as manager and was succeeded by his assistant Tony Barton.

Wolves went down to the Second Division for the second time in seven seasons, while Middlesbrough went down after eight years in the First Division. Leeds United, who had gradually lost touch with the First Division's elite since Don Revie left in 1974, lost their top flight status after 18 years.

Other memorable events of the season included the early season transfer of Bryan Robson from West Bromwich Albion to Manchester United for a national record £1.5million, and the death of legendary former Liverpool manager Bill Shankly.

=== Final table ===
Pos	Team	Pld	W	D	L	GF	GA	GD	Pts	Qualification or relegation
1	Liverpool (C)	42	26	9	7	80	32	+48	87	Qualification for the European Cup first round
2	Ipswich Town	42	26	5	11	75	53	+22	83	Qualification for the UEFA Cup first round
3	Manchester United	42	22	12	8	59	29	+30	78	Qualification for the UEFA Cup first round
4	Tottenham Hotspur	42	20	11	11	67	48	+19	71	Qualification for the Cup Winners' Cup first round (Note: Tottenham Hotspur qualified for the European Cup Winners' Cup first round as the 1981–82 FA Cup winners.)
5	Arsenal	42	20	11	11	48	37	+11	71	Qualification for the UEFA Cup first round
6	Swansea City	42	21	6	15	58	51	+7	69	Qualification for the Cup Winners' Cup preliminary round (Note: Swansea City qualified for the European Cup Winners' Cup preliminary round as the 1982 Welsh Cup winners.)
7	Southampton	42	19	9	14	72	67	+5	66	Qualification for the UEFA Cup first round
8	Everton	42	17	13	12	56	50	+6	64	
9	West Ham United	42	14	16	12	66	57	+9	58	
10	Manchester City	42	15	13	14	49	50	−1	58	
11	Aston Villa	42	15	12	15	55	53	+2	57	Qualification for the European Cup first round (Note: Aston Villa qualified for the European Cup first round as the 1981–82 European Cup winners.)
12	Nottingham Forest	42	15	12	15	42	48	−6	57	
13	Brighton & Hove Albion	42	13	13	16	43	52	−9	52	
14	Coventry City	42	13	11	18	56	62	−6	50	
15	Notts County	42	13	8	21	61	69	−8	47	
16	Birmingham City	42	10	14	18	53	61	−8	44	
17	West Bromwich Albion	42	11	11	20	46	57	−11	44	
18	Stoke City	42	12	8	22	44	63	−19	44	
19	Sunderland	42	11	11	20	38	58	−20	44	
20	Leeds United (R)	42	10	12	20	39	61	−22	42	Relegation to the Second Division
21	Wolverhampton Wanderers (R)	42	10	10	22	32	63	−31	40	Relegation to the Second Division
22	Middlesbrough (R)	42	8	15	19	34	52	−18	39	Relegation to the Second Division

Source: World Football
Rules for classification: 1) Points; 2) Goal difference; 3) Goals scored
(C) Champions; (R) Relegated

=== Results ===
Home \ Away	ARS	AST	BIR	BHA	COV	EVE	IPS	LEE	LIV	MCI	MUN	MID	NOT	NTC	SOU	STK	SUN	SWA	TOT	WBA	WHU	WOL
Arsenal		4–3	1–0	0–0	1–0	1–0	1–0	1–0	1–1	1–0	0–0	1–0	2–0	1–0	4–1	0–1	1–1	0–2	1–3	2–2	2–0	2–1
Aston Villa	0–2		0–0	3–0	2–1	1–2	0–1	1–4	0–3	0–0	1–1	1–0	3–1	0–1	1–1	2–2	1–0	3–0	1–1	2–1	3–2	3–1
Birmingham City	0–1	0–1		1–0	3–3	0–2	1–1	0–1	0–1	3–0	0–1	0–0	4–3	2–1	4–0	2–1	2–0	2–1	0–0	3–3	2–2	0–3
Brighton & Hove Albion	2–1	0–1	1–1		2–2	3–1	0–1	1–0	3–3	4–1	0–1	2–0	0–1	2–2	1–1	0–0	2–1	1–2	1–3	2–2	1–0	2–0
Coventry City	1–0	1–1	0–1	0–1		1–0	2–4	4–0	1–2	0–1	2–1	1–1	0–1	1–5	4–2	3–0	6–1	3–1	0–0	0–2	1–0	0–0
Everton	2–1	2–0	3–1	1–1	3–2		2–1	1–0	1–3	0–1	3–3	2–0	2–1	3–1	1–1	0–0	1–2	3–1	1–1	1–0	0–0	1–1
Ipswich Town	2–1	3–1	3–2	3–1	1–0	3–0		2–1	2–0	2–0	2–1	3–1	1–3	1–3	5–2	2–0	3–3	2–3	2–1	1–0	3–2	1–0
Leeds United	0–0	1–1	3–3	2–1	0–0	1–1	0–2		0–2	0–1	0–0	1–1	1–1	1–0	1–3	0–0	1–0	2–0	0–0	3–1	3–3	3–0
Liverpool	2–0	0–0	3–1	0–1	4–0	3–1	4–0	3–0		1–3	1–2	1–1	2–0	1–0	0–1	2–0	1–0	2–2	3–1	1–0	3–0	2–1
Manchester City	0–0	1–0	4–2	4–0	1–3	1–1	1–1	4–0	0–5		0–0	3–2	0–0	1–0	1–1	1–1	2–3	4–0	0–1	2–1	0–1	2–1
Manchester United	0–0	4–1	1–1	2–0	0–1	1–1	1–2	1–0	0–1	1–1		1–0	0–0	2–1	1–0	2–0	0–0	1–0	2–0	1–0	1–0	5–0
Middlesbrough	1–3	3–3	2–1	2–1	0–0	0–2	0–1	0–0	0–0	0–0	0–2		1–1	3–0	0–1	3–2	0–0	1–1	1–3	1–0	2–3	0–0
Nottingham Forest	1–2	1–1	2–1	2–1	2–1	0–1	1–1	2–1	0–2	1–1	0–1	1–1		0–2	2–1	0–0	2–0	0–2	2–0	0–0	0–0	0–1
Notts County	2–1	1–0	1–4	4–1	2–1	2–2	1–4	2–1	0–4	1–1	1–3	0–1	1–2		1–1	3–1	2–0	0–1	2–2	1–2	1–1	4–0
Southampton	3–1	0–3	3–1	0–2	5–5	1–0	4–3	4–0	2–3	2–1	3–2	2–0	2–0	3–1		4–3	1–0	3–1	1–2	0–0	2–1	4–1
Stoke City	0–1	1–0	1–0	0–0	4–0	3–1	2–0	1–2	1–5	1–3	0–3	2–0	1–2	2–2	0–2		0–1	1–2	0–2	3–0	2–1	2–1
Sunderland	0–0	2–1	2–0	3–0	0–0	3–1	1–1	0–1	0–2	1–0	1–5	0–2	2–3	1–1	2–0	0–2		0–1	0–2	1–2	0–2	0–0
Swansea City	2–0	2–1	1–0	0–0	0–0	1–3	1–2	5–1	2–0	2–0	2–0	1–2	1–2	3–2	1–0	3–0	2–0		2–1	3–1	0–1	0–0
Tottenham Hotspur	2–2	1–3	1–1	0–1	1–2	3–0	1–0	2–1	2–2	2–0	3–1	1–0	3–0	3–1	3–2	2–0	2–2	2–1		1–2	0–4	6–1
West Bromwich Albion	0–2	0–1	1–1	0–0	1–2	0–0	1–2	2–0	1–1	0–1	0–3	2–0	2–1	2–4	1–1	1–2	2–3	4–1	1–0		0–0	3–0
West Ham United	1–2	2–2	2–2	1–1	5–2	1–1	2–0	4–3	1–1	1–1	1–1	3–2	0–1	1–0	4–2	3–2	1–1	1–1	2–2	3–1		3–1
Wolverhampton Wanderers	1–1	0–3	1–1	0–1	1–0	0–3	2–1	1–0	1–0	4–1	0–1	0–0	0–0	3–2	0–0	2–0	0–1	0–1	0–1	1–2	2–1	

Updated to match(es) played on unknown. Source: Soccerbase
Legend: Blue = home team win; Yellow = draw; Red = away team win.

=== Managerial changes ===
Team	Outgoing manager	Manner of departure	Date of vacancy	Position in table	Incoming manager	Date of appointment
Everton	(England) Gordon Lee	Sacked	6 May 1981	Pre-season	(England) Howard Kendall	8 May 1981
Middlesbrough	(England) John Neal	Sacked	6 May 1981	Pre-season	(Scotland) Bobby Murdoch	13 May 1981
Coventry City	(England) Gordon Milne	Moved to a general manager role	13 May 1981	Pre-season	(England) Dave Sexton	19 May 1981
West Bromwich Albion	(England) Ron Atkinson	Signed by Manchester United	9 June 1981	Pre-season	(England) Ronnie Allen	30 June 1981
Manchester United	(England) Jack Crompton	End of caretaker spell	9 June 1981	Pre-season	(England) Ron Atkinson	9 June 1981
Stoke City	(Wales) Alan Durban	Resigned to take the Sunderland job	11 June 1981	Pre-season	(England) Richie Barker	24 June 1981
Sunderland	(Scotland) Mick Docherty	End of caretaker spell	12 June 1981	Pre-season	(Wales) Alan Durban	12 June 1981
Brighton & Hove Albion	(England) Alan Mullery	Resigned	12 June 1981	Pre-season	(England) Mike Bailey	19 June 1981
Wolverhampton Wanderers	(England) John Barnwell	Sacked	5 January 1982	18th	(England) Ian Greaves	8 February 1982
Aston Villa	(England) Ron Saunders	Resigned	9 February 1982	15th	(England) Tony Barton	9 February 1982
Birmingham City	(England) Jim Smith	Resigned	15 February 1982	19th	(England) Ron Saunders	22 February 1982

=== Maps ===
Locations of the Football League First Division London teams 1981–1982
Locations of the Football League First Division 1981–1982 teams

== Second Division ==
Second Division
- Season: 1981–82
- Champions: Luton Town
- Promoted: Luton Town; Watford; Norwich City
- Relegated: Cardiff City; Wrexham; Orient
- Matches: 462
- Goals: 1,171 (2.53 per match)
- Top goalscorer: Ronnie Moore (22 goals)
- Biggest home win: Luton Town 6–0 Grimsby Town (17 October 1981); Rotherham United 6–0 Chelsea (31 October 1981); Queens Park Rangers 7–1 Bolton Wanderers (1 May 1982)
- Biggest away win: Cardiff City 0–4 Newcastle United (3 October 1981); Newcastle United 0–4 Queens Park Rangers (5 May 1982)
- Highest scoring: Cardiff City 5–4 Cambridge United (20 March 1982)

Luton Town clinched the Second Division as their cosmopolitan side ended the club's seven-year exile from the First Division, joined by runners-up Watford (in the First Division for the first time under inspirational manager Graham Taylor) and a Norwich City side who had surged from 10th place to the final promotion place during the final quarter of the campaign. Sheffield Wednesday, QPR and Leicester City just missed out on promotion, as did two surprise contenders still yet to play in the First Division - Barnsley and Rotherham United.

Cardiff City, Wrexham and Orient were relegated; Leyton Orient have not returned to this level since, whilst Wrexham would have to wait 43 years before returning to the Second Tier.

Joe Royle, the 33-year-old former Everton striker, began his managerial career at Oldham Athletic.

=== League table ===
Pos	Team	Pld	W	D	L	GF	GA	GD	Pts	Qualification or relegation
1	Luton Town (C, P)	42	25	13	4	86	46	+40	88	Promotion to the First Division
2	Watford (P)	42	23	11	8	76	42	+34	80	Promotion to the First Division
3	Norwich City (P)	42	22	5	15	64	50	+14	71	Promotion to the First Division
4	Sheffield Wednesday	42	20	10	12	55	51	+4	70	
5	Queens Park Rangers	42	21	6	15	65	43	+22	69	
6	Barnsley	42	19	10	13	59	41	+18	67	
7	Rotherham United	42	20	7	15	66	54	+12	67	
8	Leicester City	42	18	12	12	56	48	+8	66	
9	Newcastle United	42	18	8	16	52	50	+2	62	
10	Blackburn Rovers	42	16	11	15	47	43	+4	59	
11	Oldham Athletic	42	15	14	13	50	51	−1	59	
12	Chelsea	42	15	12	15	60	60	0	57	
13	Charlton Athletic	42	13	12	17	50	65	−15	51	
14	Cambridge United	42	13	9	20	48	53	−5	48	
15	Crystal Palace	42	13	9	20	34	45	−11	48	
16	Derby County	42	12	12	18	53	68	−15	48	
17	Grimsby Town	42	11	13	18	53	65	−12	46	
18	Shrewsbury Town	42	11	13	18	37	57	−20	46	
19	Bolton Wanderers	42	13	7	22	39	61	−22	46	
20	Cardiff City (R)	42	12	8	22	45	61	−16	44	Relegation to the Third Division
21	Wrexham (R)	42	11	11	20	40	56	−16	44	Relegation to the Third Division
22	Orient (R)	42	10	9	23	36	61	−25	39	Relegation to the Third Division

Rules for classification: 1) Points; 2) Goal difference; 3) Goals scored
(C) Champions; (P) Promoted; (R) Relegated

=== Results ===
Home \ Away	BAR	BLB	BOL	CAM	CAR	CHA	CHE	CRY	DER	GRI	LEI	LUT	NEW	NWC	OLD	ORI	QPR	ROT	SHW	SHR	WAT	WRE
Barnsley		0–1	3–0	0–0	0–1	1–0	2–1	2–0	0–0	3–2	0–2	4–3	1–0	0–1	3–1	1–0	3–0	3–0	1–0	4–0	0–0	2–2
Blackburn Rovers	2–1		0–2	1–0	1–0	0–2	1–1	1–0	4–1	2–0	0–2	0–1	4–1	3–0	0–0	2–0	2–1	2–0	0–1	0–0	1–2	0–0
Bolton Wanderers	2–1	2–2		3–4	1–0	2–0	2–2	0–0	3–2	1–2	0–3	1–2	1–0	0–1	0–2	1–0	1–0	0–1	3–1	1–1	2–0	2–0
Cambridge United	2–1	1–0	2–1		2–1	4–0	1–0	0–0	1–2	2–2	1–2	1–1	1–0	1–2	0–0	2–0	1–0	3–0	1–2	2–0	1–2	2–3
Cardiff City	0–0	1–3	2–1	5–4		0–1	1–2	0–1	1–0	2–1	3–1	2–3	0–4	1–0	0–1	2–1	1–2	1–2	0–2	1–1	2–0	3–2
Charlton Athletic	2–1	2–0	1–0	0–0	2–2		3–4	2–1	2–1	2–0	1–4	0–0	0–1	0–0	3–1	5–2	1–2	1–2	3–0	1–0	1–1	1–0
Chelsea	1–2	1–1	2–0	4–1	1–0	2–2		1–2	0–2	1–1	4–1	1–2	2–1	2–1	2–2	2–2	2–1	1–4	2–1	3–1	1–3	2–0
Crystal Palace	1–2	1–2	1–0	2–1	1–0	2–0	0–1		0–1	0–3	0–2	3–3	1–2	2–1	4–0	1–0	0–0	3–1	1–2	0–1	0–3	2–1
Derby County	0–1	1–1	0–2	2–1	0–0	1–1	1–1	4–1		1–1	3–1	0–0	2–2	0–2	1–0	1–2	3–1	3–1	3–1	1–1	3–2	2–1
Grimsby Town	3–2	1–1	1–1	1–2	0–1	3–3	3–3	0–1	1–0		2–2	0–0	1–1	1–2	2–1	1–2	2–1	1–2	0–1	5–1	0–2	1–1
Leicester City	1–0	1–0	1–0	4–1	3–1	3–1	1–1	1–1	2–1	1–2		1–2	3–0	1–4	2–1	0–1	3–2	1–0	0–0	0–0	1–1	1–0
Luton Town	1–1	2–0	2–0	1–0	2–3	3–0	2–2	1–0	3–2	6–0	2–1		3–2	2–0	2–0	2–0	3–2	3–1	0–3	4–1	4–1	0–0
Newcastle United	1–0	0–0	2–0	1–0	2–1	4–1	1–0	0–0	3–0	0–1	0–0	3–2		2–1	2–0	1–0	0–4	1–1	1–0	2–0	0–1	4–2
Norwich City	1–1	2–0	0–0	2–1	2–1	5–0	2–1	1–0	4–1	2–1	0–0	1–3	2–1		1–2	2–0	0–1	2–0	2–3	2–1	4–2	4–0
Oldham Athletic	1–1	0–3	1–1	2–0	2–2	1–0	1–0	0–0	1–1	3–1	1–1	1–1	3–1	2–0		3–2	2–0	0–3	0–3	1–1	1–1	2–1
Orient	1–3	0–0	3–0	0–0	1–1	1–1	0–2	0–0	3–2	1–2	3–0	0–3	1–0	1–1	0–3		1–1	1–2	3–0	2–0	1–3	0–0
Queens Park Rangers	1–0	2–0	7–1	2–1	2–0	4–0	0–2	1–0	3–0	1–0	2–0	1–2	3–0	2–0	0–0	3–0		1–1	2–0	2–1	0–0	1–1
Rotherham United	2–4	4–1	2–0	1–0	1–0	2–1	6–0	2–0	2–1	2–2	1–1	2–2	0–0	4–1	1–2	1–0	1–0		2–2	3–0	1–2	2–0
Sheffield Wednesday	2–2	2–2	0–1	2–1	2–1	1–1	0–0	1–0	1–1	1–1	2–0	3–3	2–1	2–1	2–1	2–0	1–3	2–0		0–0	3–1	0–3
Shrewsbury Town	0–2	1–2	2–0	1–0	1–1	1–1	1–0	1–0	4–1	2–0	1–1	2–2	0–0	0–2	2–1	2–0	2–1	2–1	0–1		0–2	1–1
Watford	3–1	3–2	3–0	0–0	0–0	2–2	1–0	1–1	6–1	0–2	3–1	1–1	2–3	3–0	1–1	3–0	4–0	1–0	4–0	3–1		2–0
Wrexham	0–0	1–0	2–1	0–0	3–1	1–0	1–0	0–1	1–1	2–0	0–0	0–2	4–2	2–3	0–3	0–1	1–3	3–2	0–1	1–0	0–1	

Updated to match(es) played on unknown. Source: Soccerbase
Legend: Blue = home team win; Yellow = draw; Red = away team win.

=== Maps ===
Locations of the Football League Second Division London teams 1981–1982
Locations of the Football League Second Division 1981–1982 teams

== Third Division ==
Burnley, Carlisle United and Fulham enjoyed some success after a string of disappointments by winning promotion to the Second Division.

Going down were Wimbledon, Swindon Town, Bristol City and Chester. Bristol City had completed a unique succession of three relegations, while Swindon had been League Cup winners little over a decade earlier. Wimbledon, meanwhile, would not be enduring any more disappointing season for many years after 1982.

Football League Third Division
- Season: 1981–82
- Champions: Burnley (1st title)
- Promoted: Carlisle United; Fulham
- Relegated: Bristol City; Chester; Swindon Town; Wimbledon
- Matches: 552
- Goals: 1,422 (2.58 per match)
- Top goalscorer: Gordon Davies (Fulham), 24

Pos	Team	Pld	W	D	L	GF	GA	GD	Pts	Promotion or relegation
1	Burnley (C, P)	46	21	17	8	66	45	+21	80	Promotion to the Second Division
2	Carlisle United (P)	46	23	11	12	65	50	+15	80	Promotion to the Second Division
3	Fulham (P)	46	21	15	10	77	51	+26	78	Promotion to the Second Division
4	Lincoln City	46	21	14	11	66	40	+26	77	
5	Oxford United	46	19	14	13	63	49	+14	71	
6	Gillingham	46	20	11	15	64	56	+8	71	
7	Southend United	46	18	15	13	63	51	+12	69	
8	Brentford	46	19	11	16	56	47	+9	68	
9	Millwall	46	18	13	15	62	62	0	67	
10	Plymouth Argyle	46	18	11	17	64	56	+8	65	
11	Chesterfield	46	18	10	18	57	58	−1	64	
12	Reading	46	17	11	18	67	75	−8	62	
13	Portsmouth	46	14	19	13	56	51	+5	61	
14	Preston North End	46	16	13	17	50	56	−6	61	
15	Bristol Rovers	46	18	9	19	58	65	−7	61 (Note: Bristol Rovers had 2 points deducted.)	
16	Newport County	46	14	16	16	54	54	0	58	
17	Huddersfield Town	46	15	12	19	64	59	+5	57	
18	Exeter City	46	16	9	21	71	84	−13	57	
19	Doncaster Rovers	46	13	17	16	55	68	−13	56	
20	Walsall	46	13	14	19	51	55	−4	53	
21	Wimbledon (R)	46	14	11	21	61	75	−14	53	Relegation to the Fourth Division
22	Swindon Town (R)	46	13	13	20	55	71	−16	52	Relegation to the Fourth Division
23	Bristol City (R)	46	11	13	22	40	65	−25	46	Relegation to the Fourth Division
24	Chester (R)	46	7	11	28	36	78	−42	32	Relegation to the Fourth Division

Source: rsssf.com (incorrect), source=11v11.com
(C) Champions; (P) Promoted; (R) Relegated

=== Results ===
Home \ Away	BRE	BRI	BRR	BUR	CRL	CHE	CHF	DON	EXE	FUL	GIL	HUD	LIN	MIL	NPC	OXF	PLY	POR	PNE	REA	STD	SWI	WAL	WDN
Brentford		0–1	1–0	0–0	1–2	1–0	2–0	2–2	2–0	0–1	0–1	0–1	3–1	4–1	2–0	1–2	0–0	2–2	0–0	1–2	0–1	4–2	0–0	2–3
Bristol City	0–1		1–2	2–3	1–1	1–0	0–0	2–2	3–2	0–0	2–1	0–0	0–1	4–1	2–1	0–2	3–2	0–1	0–0	2–0	0–2	0–3	0–1	1–3
Bristol Rovers	1–2	1–0		2–1	0–1	2–2	1–0	3–0	3–2	1–2	2–0	3–2	0–2	0–1	2–0	1–0	2–3	1–1	2–0	1–1	2–1	1–4	2–1	2–2
Burnley	0–0	2–0	4–0		1–0	1–0	1–1	0–1	3–3	2–2	1–0	0–0	1–0	1–1	2–1	2–1	1–0	3–0	2–0	3–0	3–5	0–2	2–1	2–2
Carlisle United	1–0	2–2	1–2	1–0		3–0	3–0	2–0	3–2	1–2	2–0	2–2	1–0	2–1	2–2	2–1	3–1	2–0	1–0	2–1	3–2	1–1	2–1	2–1
Chester	1–2	0–0	1–1	0–1	0–1		0–2	1–1	0–2	0–2	0–0	3–1	1–2	0–0	0–2	2–2	0–3	3–2	0–1	2–3	1–1	0–0	0–0	1–1
Chesterfield	0–2	1–0	2–0	1–2	1–0	3–5		3–1	2–1	3–0	1–3	1–0	0–2	0–1	1–0	2–2	2–2	2–2	0–0	2–1	1–2	2–1	1–0	2–0
Doncaster Rovers	1–0	2–2	4–2	0–1	1–1	4–3	0–0		3–0	2–1	1–1	1–2	4–1	1–0	0–2	1–1	2–2	0–0	1–0	0–1	1–1	0–0	1–0	1–3
Exeter City	3–1	4–0	1–3	2–1	2–1	3–0	0–3	2–1		1–0	1–1	1–0	1–2	5–4	1–0	1–2	1–1	3–3	4–3	4–3	1–1	1–2	2–0	2–1
Fulham	1–2	2–1	4–2	1–1	4–1	2–0	1–0	3–1	4–1		0–0	2–2	1–1	0–0	3–1	0–0	1–3	1–1	3–0	2–2	2–1	2–0	1–1	4–1
Gillingham	1–1	1–1	2–0	3–1	0–0	0–1	3–2	3–0	2–3	2–0		3–2	1–0	1–1	1–1	2–1	3–2	4–2	0–2	2–1	2–0	1–0	1–4	6–1
Huddersfield Town	1–1	5–0	0–2	1–2	2–1	1–2	1–1	1–2	1–1	1–0	2–0		0–2	1–2	2–0	2–0	0–0	0–1	2–3	6–1	3–2	3–0	2–1	1–1
Lincoln City	1–0	1–2	1–0	1–1	0–0	3–0	2–1	5–0	2–0	1–1	2–0	2–0		0–1	2–2	2–1	2–0	1–1	1–2	2–1	1–1	2–0	1–1	5–1
Millwall	0–1	2–0	0–0	4–3	1–2	2–1	3–2	0–2	5–1	4–3	1–2	1–3	1–1		1–0	1–2	2–1	1–0	2–1	0–1	1–1	0–0	2–0	2–1
Newport County	2–0	1–1	1–1	0–0	2–0	0–1	1–0	1–0	1–1	1–3	4–2	1–0	0–0	1–1		3–2	0–1	1–1	1–1	3–1	3–2	1–0	2–2	0–0
Oxford United	1–2	1–0	1–1	0–0	2–1	3–1	1–1	3–1	0–0	2–0	1–1	1–0	1–1	0–0	1–1		1–0	0–2	3–0	1–0	0–2	5–0	0–1	0–3
Plymouth Argyle	1–0	2–1	4–0	1–1	1–0	5–1	0–2	4–2	2–1	3–1	1–2	1–1	0–2	2–1	1–2	0–1		0–0	0–3	1–1	0–0	2–1	4–1	2–0
Portsmouth	2–2	2–0	0–0	1–2	1–2	2–0	5–1	0–0	2–0	1–1	1–0	2–1	1–1	2–2	0–0	1–1	1–0		1–1	3–0	0–0	3–0	1–0	1–0
Preston North End	1–3	1–3	0–1	1–1	0–1	0–1	2–0	3–1	1–0	1–3	1–1	1–1	1–1	1–0	2–1	2–2	1–0	1–0		0–0	1–0	0–0	1–0	3–2
Reading	4–1	3–1	0–3	1–1	2–2	4–1	0–2	3–3	4–0	0–3	3–2	1–2	3–2	4–0	2–1	0–3	2–2	2–1	2–1		0–2	1–1	0–0	2–1
Southend	1–1	3–0	1–0	1–4	1–1	2–0	0–2	1–1	2–1	0–0	3–0	4–0	0–2	2–2	0–4	0–1	3–0	2–0	2–2	2–0		0–0	3–2	2–0
Swindon Town	0–3	0–0	5–2	1–2	2–1	3–0	1–2	2–2	3–2	1–4	0–1	1–5	1–0	1–2	1–1	3–2	0–2	2–0	4–0	0–2	0–0		2–2	4–1
Walsall	3–0	0–1	2–1	1–1	1–1	2–1	1–1	0–0	2–1	1–1	1–0	1–1	2–1	1–1	3–1	1–3	0–1	3–1	0–3	1–2	0–1	5–0		1–0
Wimbledon	1–2	0–0	1–0	0–0	3–1	1–0	3–1	0–1	1–1	1–3	0–2	2–0	1–1	1–3	2–3	2–3	2–1	3–2	3–2	0–0	3–0	1–1	2–0	

Updated to match(es) played on unknown. Source: Soccerbase
Legend: Blue = home team win; Yellow = draw; Red = away team win.

=== Maps ===
Locations of the Football League Third Division London teams 1981–1982
Locations of the Football League Third Division teams 1981–1982

== Fourth Division ==
Football League Fourth Division
- Season: 1981–82
- Champions: Sheffield United (1st title)
- Promoted: Bournemouth; Bradford City; Wigan Athletic
- Failed re-election: None
- Matches: 552
- Goals: 1,512 (2.74 per match)
- Top goalscorer: Keith Edwards (Hull City / Sheffield United) 36

Sheffield United began the first phase of their revival by winning the Fourth Division championship, which marked a superb start to the management career of Ian Porterfield. Also promoted were Bradford City, Wigan Athletic and Bournemouth.

Crewe Alexandra endured a terrible season and propped up the league with just 27 league points, but the other league members voted in their favour and they maintained their league status.

Pos	Team	Pld	W	D	L	GF	GA	GD	Pts	Promotion
1	Sheffield United (C, P)	46	27	15	4	94	41	+53	96	Promotion to the Third Division
2	Bradford City (P)	46	26	13	7	88	45	+43	91	Promotion to the Third Division
3	Wigan Athletic (P)	46	26	13	7	80	46	+34	91	Promotion to the Third Division
4	Bournemouth (P)	46	23	19	4	62	30	+32	88	Promotion to the Third Division
5	Peterborough United	46	24	10	12	71	57	+14	82	
6	Colchester United	46	20	12	14	82	57	+25	72	
7	Port Vale	46	18	16	12	56	49	+7	70	
8	Hull City	46	19	12	15	70	61	+9	69	
9	Bury	46	17	17	12	80	59	+21	68	
10	Hereford United	46	16	19	11	64	58	+6	67	
11	Tranmere Rovers	46	14	18	14	51	56	−5	60	
12	Blackpool	46	15	13	18	66	60	+6	58	
13	Darlington	46	15	13	18	61	62	−1	58	
14	Hartlepool United	46	13	16	17	73	84	−11	55	
15	Torquay United	46	14	13	19	47	59	−12	55	
16	Aldershot	46	13	15	18	57	68	−11	54	
17	York City	46	14	8	24	69	91	−22	50	
18	Stockport County	46	12	13	21	48	67	−19	49	
19	Halifax Town	46	9	22	15	51	72	−21	49	
20	Mansfield Town	46	13	10	23	63	81	−18	47 (Note: Mansfield Town had 2 points deducted.)	
21	Rochdale	46	10	16	20	50	62	−12	46	Re-elected
22	Northampton Town	46	11	9	26	57	84	−27	42	Re-elected
23	Scunthorpe United	46	9	15	22	43	79	−36	42	Re-elected
24	Crewe Alexandra	46	6	9	31	29	84	−55	27	Re-elected

(C) Champions; (P) Promoted

=== Results ===
Home \ Away	ALD	BLP	BOU	BRA	BRY	COL	CRE	DAR	HAL	HAR	HER	HUL	MAN	NOR	PET	PTV	ROC	SCU	SHU	STP	TOR	TRA	WIG	YOR
Aldershot		3–2	2–0	0–2	1–2	1–1	3–0	0–0	3–1	1–2	2–2	0–3	2–3	2–1	0–1	1–2	2–2	4–0	1–1	1–1	1–1	2–1	2–0	0–1
Blackpool	0–2		0–3	1–0	1–1	0–0	5–0	1–0	7–1	2–2	1–0	3–1	2–3	1–0	2–2	2–3	1–1	2–0	0–1	2–0	2–1	1–2	1–2	3–1
Bournemouth	2–2	1–0		0–2	3–2	1–1	2–0	2–0	1–1	5–1	1–1	1–0	1–0	1–1	1–1	1–1	1–0	2–0	0–0	1–0	4–0	1–1	0–0	5–1
Bradford City	4–1	1–0	2–2		1–1	2–1	4–1	3–0	5–2	1–0	0–0	1–1	3–4	2–1	2–0	1–0	2–0	0–0	0–2	5–1	3–0	1–1	3–3	6–2
Bury	1–1	0–1	2–2	1–1		4–3	2–1	2–0	1–1	1–1	1–1	0–2	3–2	7–1	3–1	3–2	3–0	4–0	1–1	2–0	0–1	4–0	5–3	3–1
Colchester United	1–1	2–1	1–2	1–2	1–1		1–1	1–0	1–1	3–3	4–0	2–0	0–1	5–1	1–1	1–0	3–2	2–1	5–2	0–1	3–0	4–0	1–2	4–0
Crewe Alexandra	2–3	1–1	0–0	0–1	1–2	1–3		1–0	0–1	1–2	1–0	1–1	0–2	2–2	0–1	0–2	1–2	3–0	2–3	0–2	0–1	1–1	0–1	1–1
Darlington	0–1	2–2	0–1	1–5	2–3	1–2	1–0		1–1	5–2	0–1	2–1	1–0	3–0	0–0	1–1	2–0	4–1	0–2	2–0	1–1	1–2	3–1	3–1
Halifax Town	2–2	0–0	1–1	0–0	2–1	0–2	2–1	3–3		2–0	1–2	2–2	2–1	2–1	1–1	1–1	0–0	1–2	1–5	4–1	1–2	0–2	0–0	0–0
Hartlepool	2–2	2–2	1–1	0–2	1–0	1–3	1–2	1–2	3–2		2–1	3–2	3–0	3–1	0–1	3–1	1–1	3–3	2–3	2–2	0–0	0–0	2–1	3–2
Hereford United	0–1	2–1	1–2	1–2	3–0	2–2	4–1	1–1	2–2	1–1		2–2	3–1	2–1	2–1	1–0	0–0	2–1	1–1	0–0	0–3	1–1	3–0	2–1
Hull City	1–2	1–0	0–0	2–1	3–2	2–3	1–0	1–3	2–0	5–2	2–1		2–0	0–1	1–1	3–1	2–1	2–0	2–1	0–0	1–0	1–2	0–2	2–0
Mansfield Town	1–0	2–2	0–1	0–2	1–1	1–3	0–1	2–3	3–2	3–2	2–1	3–3		4–1	1–2	1–3	4–3	1–1	1–1	2–2	3–1	3–0	1–2	0–2
Northampton Town	0–0	0–1	1–0	0–2	1–0	1–2	3–0	0–1	0–1	2–1	2–3	1–1	1–1		1–0	3–5	2–1	1–1	1–2	0–0	2–0	3–2	2–3	5–0
Peterborough United	7–1	3–1	1–0	2–0	1–0	2–2	3–0	3–1	0–0	4–4	3–1	3–0	1–0	1–0		1–0	5–1	2–1	0–4	2–0	1–0	1–2	0–3	0–1
Port Vale	1–0	2–0	1–1	1–1	0–0	2–1	0–0	2–2	0–0	5–2	1–1	2–1	0–0	1–0	1–3		1–1	2–1	0–2	1–0	2–0	0–0	1–1	0–0
Rochdale	0–0	0–0	0–1	1–1	1–1	1–2	1–0	3–2	0–1	2–1	0–1	0–1	1–1	5–3	1–1	1–2		1–1	0–1	4–1	1–0	0–0	1–1	2–0
Scunthorpe United	1–1	1–1	0–2	1–3	2–2	2–1	0–1	1–1	0–0	2–1	2–2	4–4	1–0	2–1	0–1	0–0	1–0		2–1	0–0	0–2	2–1	2–7	0–3
Sheffield United	2–0	3–1	0–0	1–1	1–1	1–0	4–0	0–0	2–2	1–1	2–2	0–0	4–1	7–3	4–0	2–1	3–1	1–0		4–0	4–1	2–0	1–0	4–0
Stockport County	4–2	2–3	1–2	2–3	2–1	0–0	2–0	1–0	2–1	0–2	1–1	1–2	3–0	0–0	3–0	1–2	0–4	1–1	1–0		2–1	1–1	0–1	4–1
Torquay United	2–1	1–1	1–2	2–0	1–1	1–0	1–1	1–2	2–2	1–1	1–2	2–1	2–0	2–2	1–2	0–1	2–1	1–0	1–1	1–0		1–2	0–0	3–2
Tranmere	1–0	3–1	0–1	1–1	1–3	2–1	3–0	1–1	1–1	1–0	0–0	2–2	2–2	0–2	1–2	1–2	2–0	0–1	2–2	2–0	1–1		0–0	0–2
Wigan Athletic	1–0	2–1	0–0	4–1	3–2	3–2	3–0	2–1	2–0	1–1	1–1	2–1	3–1	3–1	5–0	2–0	1–1	2–1	0–1	2–1	1–0	0–0		4–2
York City	4–0	0–4	0–1	0–3	0–0	3–0	6–0	2–2	4–0	1–2	3–4	1–3	2–1	2–1	4–3	2–0	1–2	3–1	3–4	2–2	1–1	1–3	0–0	

Updated to match(es) played on unknown. Source: Soccerbase
Legend: Blue = home team win; Yellow = draw; Red = away team win.

=== Maps ===
Locations of the Football League Fourth Division teams 1981–1982

== Election/re-election to the Football League ==
This year Runcorn, the winners of the Alliance Premier League, could not apply for election because they did not meet Football League requirements. Second placed Enfield could not apply either for the same reasons, so third placed Telford United won the right to apply for election to the Football League to replace one of the four bottom sides in the 1981–82 Football League Fourth Division. The vote went as follows:

Club	Final Position	Votes
Northampton Town	22nd (Fourth Division)	53
Crewe Alexandra	24th (Fourth Division)	50
Rochdale	21st (Fourth Division)	48
Scunthorpe United	23rd (Fourth Division)	48
Telford United	3rd (Alliance Premier League)	13

As a result of this, all four Football League teams were re-elected, and Telford United were denied membership of the League.

== Attendances ==
=== Division One ===
No.	Club	Average	Highest	Lowest
1	Manchester United	44,571	57,830	34,499
2	Tottenham Hotspur FC	35,100	46,827	22,819
3	Liverpool FC	35,061	48,461	24,224
4	Manchester City FC	34,063	52,037	24,443
5	Aston Villa FC	26,780	41,098	18,294
6	West Ham United FC	26,585	34,026	17,130
7	Arsenal FC	25,589	48,897	13,738
8	Everton FC	24,674	51,806	15,328
9	Leeds United FC	22,109	33,689	16,385
10	Ipswich Town FC	21,925	29,050	17,924
11	Southampton FC	21,835	24,704	18,622
12	Nottingham Forest FC	19,937	26,327	15,037
13	Sunderland AFC	19,608	29,372	11,845
14	Brighton & Hove Albion FC	18,244	27,082	10,427
15	Swansea City AFC	18,236	24,115	11,811
16	Birmingham City FC	17,117	32,817	10,715
17	West Bromwich Albion FC	16,786	23,329	11,632
18	Wolverhampton Wanderers FC	15,242	28,001	11,099
19	Stoke City FC	14,635	25,256	9,120
20	Middlesbrough FC	13,413	21,019	9,403
21	Coventry City FC	13,100	19,329	9,677
22	Notts County FC	11,613	19,304	6,707

=== Division Two ===
No.	Club	Average	Highest	Lowest
1	Sheffield Wednesday FC	19,170	30,861	13,047
2	Newcastle United FC	17,276	26,994	9,419
3	Barnsley FC	15,098	28,870	9,287
4	Watford FC	14,631	23,987	9,018
5	Leicester City FC	14,182	21,123	9,524
6	Norwich City FC	14,182	18,827	11,626
7	Chelsea FC	13,132	20,036	6,009
8	Queens Park Rangers FC	12,574	22,091	8,753
9	Luton Town FC	11,881	16,657	8,776
10	Derby County FC	11,828	16,046	7,518
11	Crystal Palace FC	10,381	17,633	7,198
12	Rotherham United FC	9,857	19,841	6,346
13	Grimsby Town FC	8,406	13,370	6,141
14	Blackburn Rovers FC	8,405	15,182	5,207
15	Bolton Wanderers FC	7,597	16,577	5,085
16	Oldham Athletic FC	7,023	15,845	2,919
17	Charlton Athletic FC	6,657	11,133	3,379
18	Cardiff City FC	5,574	10,277	3,239
19	Cambridge United FC	5,073	8,815	3,127
20	Shrewsbury Town FC	4,571	8,103	2,898
21	Leyton Orient FC	4,419	9,698	2,090
22	Wrexham AFC	4,304	6,506	3,076

=== Division Three ===
No.	Club	Average	Highest	Lowest
1	Portsmouth FC	8,544	11,299	4,889
2	Fulham FC	6,938	20,461	3,629
3	Burnley FC	6,936	18,771	3,377
4	Huddersfield Town AFC	6,746	10,269	3,468
5	Bristol City FC	6,511	11,451	3,404
6	Oxford United FC	5,851	10,407	3,843
7	Swindon Town FC	5,825	9,608	4,084
8	Brentford FC	5,693	10,834	4,124
9	Preston North End FC	5,497	7,815	4,171
10	Bristol Rovers FC	5,402	12,155	3,650
11	Gillingham FC	5,241	9,895	3,245
12	Doncaster Rovers FC	5,234	11,319	3,431
13	Southend United FC	5,083	8,108	3,416
14	Plymouth Argyle FC	4,792	9,458	2,646
15	Chesterfield FC	4,737	7,732	2,028
16	Millwall FC	4,626	7,474	2,562
17	Newport County AFC	4,459	5,915	2,978
18	Carlisle United FC	4,409	6,653	3,085
19	Lincoln City FC	4,222	8,243	2,218
20	Reading FC	4,026	7,171	2,596
21	Exeter City FC	3,858	9,144	2,498
22	Walsall FC	3,744	6,010	2,487
23	Wimbledon FC	2,596	5,554	1,503
24	Chester City FC	2,062	3,509	1,210

=== Division Four ===
No.	Club	Average	Highest	Lowest
1	Sheffield United FC	14,892	24,593	11,293
2	AFC Bournemouth	5,933	9,925	3,244
3	Wigan Athletic FC	5,796	9,021	3,996
4	Bradford City AFC	5,391	13,919	3,601
5	Peterborough United FC	4,698	13,459	1,897
6	Hull City AFC	4,270	7,397	3,040
7	Blackpool FC	4,224	9,439	1,824
8	Port Vale FC	3,639	8,773	1,924
9	Bury FC	3,533	6,650	1,720
10	Colchester United FC	2,859	5,194	1,570
11	Mansfield Town FC	2,685	8,944	1,394
12	Hereford United FC	2,592	4,191	2,060
13	Stockport County FC	2,547	5,450	1,357
14	Darlington FC	2,510	12,557	1,283
15	Halifax Town AFC	2,407	8,077	1,305
16	York City FC	2,360	5,560	1,571
17	Northampton Town FC	2,306	4,975	1,552
18	Torquay United FC	2,248	5,126	1,039
19	Scunthorpe United FC	2,232	8,105	1,106
20	Crewe Alexandra FC	2,192	6,716	1,116
21	Aldershot Town FC	2,168	4,100	1,171
22	Hartlepool United FC	2,055	4,548	1,202
23	Rochdale AFC	1,837	3,966	1,056
24	Tranmere Rovers	1,734	4,675	1,141

== See also ==
- 1981–82 in English football
