= 1901–02 Football League =

14th season of the Football League

The Football League
- Season: 1901–02
- Champions: Sunderland
- Relegated: none
- New Clubs in League: Bristol City, Doncaster Rovers

The 1901–02 season was the 14th season of The Football League.

== Final league tables ==
Beginning in the 1894–95 season, clubs finishing level on points were separated according to goal average (goals scored divided by goals conceded). In case one or more teams had the same goal difference, this system favoured those teams who had conceded fewer goals. The goal average system was eventually scrapped beginning with the 1976–77 season.

During the first six seasons of the league, (up to the 1893–94 season), re-election process concerned the clubs which finished in the bottom four of the league. From the 1894–95 season and until the 1920–21 season the re-election process was required of the clubs which finished in the bottom three of the league.

== First Division ==
First Division
- Season: 1901–02
- Champions: Sunderland; 4th English title
- Relegated: Small Heath; Manchester City
- Matches: 306
- Goals: 840 (2.75 per match)
- Top goalscorer: Jimmy Settle (18 goals)
- Biggest home win: Newcastle United 8–0 Notts County (26 October 1901)
- Biggest away win: Blackburn Rovers 1–4 Manchester City (12 April 1902); Manchester City 1–4 Small Heath (14 September 1901); Sheffield United 1–4 Small Heath (15 February 1902); 0–3: five matches
- Highest scoring: Newcastle United 8–0 Notts County (26 October 1901); Notts County 5–3 Wolverhampton Wanderers (28 March 1902)
- Longest winning run: 5 matches Nottingham Forest
- Longest unbeaten run: 10 matches Sunderland
- Longest losing run: 5 matches Manchester City
- Highest attendance: 50,000; Aston Villa 1–0 Small Heath (26 December 1901)
- Lowest attendance: 2,000; Blackburn Rovers 2–0 Bolton Wanderers (7 December 1901); Wolverhampton Wanderers 3–0 Newcastle United (10 March 1902); Nottingham Forest 0–2 Newcastle United (19 March 1902); Derby County 1–0 Sunderland (5 April 1902); The Wednesday 1–1 Everton (5 April 1902); Bury 2–1 Wolverhampton Wanderers (12 April 1902); Blackburn Rovers 3–1 Derby County (19 April 1902)
- Average attendance: 11,209

Pos	Team	Pld	W	D	L	GF	GA	GAv	Pts	Relegation
1	Sunderland (C)	34	19	6	9	50	35	1.429	44	
2	Everton	34	17	7	10	53	35	1.514	41	
3	Newcastle United	34	14	9	11	48	34	1.412	37	
4	Blackburn Rovers	34	15	6	13	52	48	1.083	36	
5	Nottingham Forest	34	13	9	12	43	43	1.000	35	
6	Derby County	34	13	9	12	39	41	0.951	35	
7	Bury	34	13	8	13	44	38	1.158	34	
8	Aston Villa	34	13	8	13	42	40	1.050	34	
9	The Wednesday	34	13	8	13	48	52	0.923	34	
10	Sheffield United	34	13	7	14	53	48	1.104	33	
11	Liverpool	34	10	12	12	42	38	1.105	32	
12	Bolton Wanderers	34	12	8	14	51	56	0.911	32	
13	Notts County	34	14	4	16	51	57	0.895	32	
14	Wolverhampton Wanderers	34	13	6	15	46	57	0.807	32	
15	Grimsby Town	34	13	6	15	44	60	0.733	32	
16	Stoke	34	11	9	14	45	55	0.818	31	
17	Small Heath (R)	34	11	8	15	47	45	1.044	30	Relegation to the Second Division
18	Manchester City (R)	34	11	6	17	42	58	0.724	28	Relegation to the Second Division

Source: World Football
Rules for classification: 1) Points; 2) Goal average; 3) Goals scored
(C) Champions; (R) Relegated

=== Results ===
Home \ Away	AST	BLB	BOL	BRY	DER	EVE	GRI	LIV	MCI	NEW	NOT	NTC	SHU	SMH	STK	SUN	WED	WOL
Aston Villa		1–1	1–0	2–0	3–2	1–1	4–1	0–1	2–2	0–0	3–0	2–0	1–2	1–0	0–0	0–1	4–1	2–1
Blackburn Rovers	4–0		2–0	0–3	3–1	3–1	2–0	1–1	1–4	0–0	1–0	4–2	2–1	3–1	6–1	0–1	2–0	2–0
Bolton Wanderers	2–2	4–0		2–2	2–1	1–3	4–0	1–0	3–3	3–1	3–0	1–1	1–0	4–0	2–1	0–0	3–1	2–2
Bury	0–0	2–0	2–2		2–0	1–0	1–1	0–0	3–0	4–0	1–1	3–0	1–2	2–0	4–2	1–0	2–0	2–1
Derby County	1–0	1–1	1–2	1–0		3–1	2–0	1–1	2–0	1–0	1–1	2–0	3–1	0–0	1–0	1–0	2–2	3–1
Everton	2–3	0–2	1–0	1–1	2–0		0–1	4–0	3–1	0–0	1–0	0–1	2–1	1–0	1–0	2–0	5–0	6–1
Grimsby Town	4–1	2–1	4–1	2–0	1–1	0–2		1–1	3–2	3–0	1–0	1–0	0–1	1–0	1–2	3–3	3–1	3–0
Liverpool	1–0	1–0	1–1	1–0	0–2	2–2	2–2		4–0	0–1	0–2	0–1	1–0	3–1	7–0	0–1	1–2	4–1
Manchester City	1–0	1–1	1–0	2–0	0–0	2–0	3–0	2–3		2–0	3–1	1–0	4–0	1–4	2–2	0–3	0–3	3–0
Newcastle United	2–1	0–3	4–1	1–1	0–1	1–1	5–1	1–0	3–0		3–0	8–0	1–1	2–0	5–1	0–1	2–1	3–1
Nottingham Forest	1–1	3–0	4–1	2–1	3–1	4–0	0–1	1–1	3–1	0–2		1–0	2–1	1–1	2–0	2–1	1–1	2–0
Notts County	0–3	3–0	2–1	2–1	3–2	0–2	3–0	2–2	2–0	0–2	3–0		4–0	6–1	1–1	2–0	6–1	5–3
Sheffield United	6–0	4–1	2–0	3–1	3–0	0–0	2–2	2–1	5–0	1–0	2–2	3–0		1–4	1–1	0–1	3–0	0–0
Small Heath	0–2	2–0	2–0	1–0	5–1	0–1	6–0	0–0	1–0	3–1	1–1	0–0	5–1		1–1	2–3	1–1	1–2
Stoke	1–0	2–2	4–0	1–2	1–1	1–2	2–0	1–0	3–0	0–0	1–1	3–0	3–2	1–0		3–0	1–2	3–0
Sunderland	1–0	3–2	2–1	3–0	1–0	2–4	3–1	1–1	1–0	0–0	4–0	2–1	3–1	1–1	2–0		1–2	2–0
The Wednesday	1–0	0–1	5–1	4–1	2–0	1–1	3–1	1–1	2–1	0–0	0–2	4–0	1–0	1–2	3–1	1–1		1–1
Wolverhampton Wanderers	0–2	3–1	1–2	1–0	0–0	2–1	2–0	3–1	0–0	3–0	2–0	3–1	1–1	2–1	4–1	4–2	1–0	

Updated to match(es) played on unknown. Source:
Legend: Blue = home team win; Yellow = draw; Red = away team win.
- Liverpool's 7-0 victory over Stoke City was mainly due to the visiting team eating rancid fish before the game. Players were physically ill, and only seven players took the field for the second half.

=== Maps ===
Locations of the Football League First Division teams

== Second Division ==
Second Division
- Season: 1901–02
- Champions: West Bromwich Albion
- Promoted: West Bromwich Albion; Middlesbrough
- Matches: 306
- Goals: 885 (2.89 per match)
- Top goalscorer: Chippy Simmons (23 goals)
- Biggest home win: Preston North End 8–0 Lincoln City (28 December 1901)
- Biggest away win: Burton United 0–6 Lincoln City (23 November 1901)
- Highest scoring: Barnsley 2–7 Middlesbrough (22 February 1902)
- Longest winning run: 10 matches West Bromwich Albion
- Longest unbeaten run: 17 matches West Bromwich Albion
- Longest losing run: 6 matches Stockport County

Pos	Team	Pld	W	D	L	GF	GA	GAv	Pts	Promotion or relegation
1	West Bromwich Albion (C, P)	34	25	5	4	82	29	2.828	55	Promotion to the First Division
2	Middlesbrough (P)	34	23	5	6	90	24	3.750	51	Promotion to the First Division
3	Preston North End	34	18	6	10	71	32	2.219	42	
4	Woolwich Arsenal	34	18	6	10	50	26	1.923	42	
5	Lincoln City	34	14	13	7	45	35	1.286	41	
6	Bristol City	34	17	6	11	52	35	1.486	40	
7	Doncaster Rovers	34	13	8	13	49	58	0.845	34	
8	Glossop	34	10	12	12	36	40	0.900	32	
9	Burnley	34	10	10	14	41	45	0.911	30	
10	Burton United	34	11	8	15	46	54	0.852	30	
11	Barnsley	34	12	6	16	51	63	0.810	30	
12	Burslem Port Vale	34	10	9	15	43	59	0.729	29	
13	Blackpool	34	11	7	16	40	56	0.714	29	
14	Leicester Fosse	34	12	5	17	38	56	0.679	29	
15	Newton Heath	34	11	6	17	38	53	0.717	28	
16	Chesterfield Town	34	11	6	17	47	68	0.691	28	Re-elected
17	Stockport County	34	8	7	19	36	72	0.500	23	Re-elected
18	Gainsborough Trinity	34	4	11	19	30	80	0.375	19	Re-elected

Rules for classification: 1) Points; 2) Goal average; 3) Goals scored
(C) Champions; (P) Promoted

=== Results ===
Home \ Away	BAR	BLP	BRI	BRN	BPV	BRT	CHF	DON	GAI	GLP	LEI	LIN	MID	NWH	PNE	STP	WBA	WOO
Barnsley		2–0	2–2	2–2	4–0	3–2	3–2	3–0	2–0	1–4	2–3	2–2	2–7	3–2	0–4	3–1	0–2	2–0
Blackpool	2–1		0–2	2–1	1–0	1–0	0–0	3–1	3–0	1–1	4–0	3–0	0–2	2–4	1–4	1–0	2–2	1–3
Bristol City	3–1	3–0		1–0	4–0	0–2	5–2	3–0	4–0	2–0	2–1	1–1	1–0	4–0	2–0	3–0	1–2	0–3
Burnley	2–0	2–0	0–1		4–1	0–0	0–0	7–0	6–0	1–1	1–0	1–0	2–2	1–0	0–3	3–0	0–0	0–0
Burslem Port Vale	2–1	0–1	3–0	1–1		2–1	4–2	2–2	1–1	1–0	3–0	1–2	1–1	1–1	0–0	1–1	2–3	1–0
Burton United	2–1	1–1	2–2	5–2	3–0		0–1	1–1	5–0	1–1	2–0	0–6	3–2	0–0	1–1	3–2	1–3	2–0
Chesterfield	1–2	3–1	1–0	3–0	4–3	3–1		0–0	2–0	1–0	3–3	0–1	0–0	3–0	2–0	8–1	0–3	1–3
Doncaster Rovers	0–1	4–3	3–0	3–0	3–3	2–0	4–1		3–0	1–2	2–1	1–1	0–0	4–0	4–0	2–0	2–0	1–0
Gainsborough Trinity	0–0	3–0	2–0	1–1	2–3	1–4	0–0	4–1		2–1	3–3	2–2	1–4	1–1	0–1	1–1	1–1	2–2
Glossop	1–1	3–1	1–2	0–0	0–1	2–1	3–1	3–1	0–0		1–1	1–1	1–0	0–0	3–1	2–1	1–2	0–1
Leicester Fosse	2–0	1–0	0–1	2–1	0–1	4–0	3–0	1–0	2–0	1–1		3–1	0–2	3–2	1–0	1–1	0–3	2–1
Lincoln City	1–1	0–0	1–0	1–0	1–1	0–0	4–0	0–0	3–0	1–0	2–0		2–1	2–0	2–1	5–0	1–0	0–0
Middlesbrough	2–1	2–1	2–0	3–0	3–0	5–0	7–1	6–0	3–1	5–0	5–0	0–0		5–0	2–1	6–0	1–2	1–0
Newton Heath	1–0	0–1	1–0	2–0	1–0	3–1	2–0	6–0	3–0	1–0	2–0	0–0	1–2		0–2	3–3	1–2	0–1
Preston North End	4–0	1–1	0–0	3–1	2–0	1–0	5–0	3–0	4–1	2–2	5–0	8–0	0–3	5–1		4–0	1–2	2–0
Stockport County	2–3	3–1	1–1	1–2	4–2	2–0	3–0	1–2	2–1	0–0	2–0	2–1	1–3	1–0	0–2		0–2	0–0
West Bromwich Albion	3–1	7–2	2–2	3–0	3–1	2–1	4–0	2–2	7–0	0–1	1–0	4–1	2–0	4–0	3–1	3–0		2–1
Woolwich Arsenal	2–1	0–0	2–0	4–0	3–1	0–1	3–2	1–0	5–0	4–0	2–0	2–0	0–3	2–0	0–0	3–0	2–1	

Updated to match(es) played on unknown. Source: Ian Laschke: Rothmans Book of Football League Records 1888–89 to 1978–79. Macdonald and Jane’s, London & Sydney, 1980.
Legend: Blue = home team win; Yellow = draw; Red = away team win.

=== Maps ===
Locations of the Football League Second Division teams

== Attendances ==
=== Division One ===
No.	Club	Average
1	Aston Villa FC	19,580
2	Manchester City FC	16,825
3	Everton FC	16,030
4	Liverpool FC	14,715
5	Newcastle United FC	14,450
6	Birmingham City FC	13,265
7	Sunderland AFC	12,905
8	Sheffield United FC	12,880
9	Bolton Wanderers FC	10,200
10	The Wednesday	9,765
11	Notts County FC	9,430
12	Derby County FC	9,050
13	Nottingham Forest FC	8,605
14	Blackburn Rovers FC	7,950
15	Bury FC	7,870
16	Stoke City FC	7,280
17	Wolverhampton Wanderers FC	6,525
18	Grimsby Town FC	5,955

== See also ==
- 1901–02 in English football
- 1901 in association football
- 1902 in association football

== Sources ==
- Ian Laschke: Rothmans Book of Football League Records 1888–89 to 1978–79. Macdonald and Jane's, London & Sydney, 1980.
