= John Coshall =

English footballer

Personal information
- Full name: John William Macdonald Coshall
- Date of birth: 21 January 1901
- Place of birth: Erith, England
- Date of death: 1975 (aged 73–74)
- Position: Left-back

Senior career*
Years	Team	Apps	(Gls)
- Erith & Belvedere
1928–1929	West Ham United	2	(0)
- Cannes
- * Club domestic league appearances and goals

John William Macdonald Coshall (21 January 1901 – 1975) was an English footballer who played as a left-back in the Football League for West Ham United. He later played for French club AS Cannes.

Coshall joined West Ham United for the 1928–29 season, along with Erith teammate Arthur Smith, after impressing during preseason games. He made two First Division appearances for the east London club. He went on to join AS Cannes, part of a contingent of British players in the South of France around that time; contemporaries at the club with League experience were Ted Donaghy, Stan Hillier and Willie Aitken.
