= James Oakley (footballer) =

English footballer

Personal information
- Full name: James Ernest Oakley
- Date of birth: 10 November 1901
- Place of birth: Tynemouth, England
- Date of death: 1972 (aged 70–71)
- Place of death: Northumberland, England
- Height: 5 ft 7 in (1.70 m)
- Position: Full-back

Senior career*
Years	Team	Apps	(Gls)
1920–1921	Seaton Delaval		
1921–1922	Blyth Spartans		
1922–1930	Sunderland	84	(0)
1930–1931	Reading	10	(0)
1931–1933	Northampton Town	33	(0)
1933–1934	Kettering Town		
1934–193?	Birtley		
- * Club domestic league appearances and goals

James Ernest Oakley (10 November 1901 – 1972) was an English professional footballer who played as a full-back for Sunderland.
