= Augusto Lopes =

Portuguese footballer

António Augusto Lopes
Personal information
- Date of birth: 15 September 1901
- Place of birth: Portugal
- Position: Forward

Senior career*
Years	Team	Apps	(Gls)
- Casa Pia

International career
1921	Portugal	1	(0)
- * Club domestic league appearances and goals

António Augusto Lopes (born 15 September 1901 – unknown) was a Portuguese footballer, who played as a forward.
