= Billy Powell (footballer) =

English footballer

Personal information
- Full name: William Methuen Phillips Powell
- Date of birth: 21 January 1901
- Place of birth: Sutton-in-Ashfield, England
- Date of death: 1981 (aged 79–80)
- Height: 5 ft 8 in (1.73 m)
- Position: Wing half

Senior career*
Years	Team	Apps	(Gls)
1922–1923	Retford Town		
1923–1924	Sutton Town		
1924–1927	The Wednesday	20	(0)
1927–1930	Grimsby Town	78	(1)
1930–1931	Southend United	1	(0)
1931–193?	Sutton Town		
- * Club domestic league appearances and goals

William Methuen Phillips Powell (21 January 1901 – 1981) was an English professional footballer who played as a wing half.
