= Nottingham derby =

Association football rivalry in England

Nottingham Derby
- Other names: Trentside derby
- Teams: Nottingham Forest, Notts County
- First meeting: Notts County 1–3 Nottingham Forest; 1878–79 FA Cup (16 November 1878)
- Latest meeting: Notts County 3–3 (3–4p) Nottingham Forest; EFL Cup (9 August 2011)
- Stadiums: City Ground; Meadow Lane

Statistics
- Total meetings: 96
- Most wins: Nottingham Forest (40)
- All-time series: Nottingham Forest: 40; Draw: 27; Notts County: 30
- Largest victory: Nottingham Forest 5-0 Notts County; 1900–01 First Division (24 November 1900); Nottingham Forest 5-0 Notts County; 1953–54 Second Division (10 October 1953)
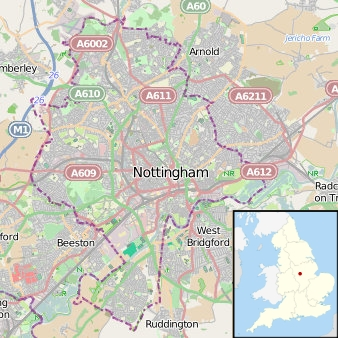

The Nottingham derby is the name given to football matches contested between Nottingham Forest and Notts County.

== History ==
The two clubs are amongst the oldest football clubs in the World. County were formed in 1862 and are the oldest professional association football club in the world. Forest were formed three years later by a group of men playing bandy.

The first meeting between the two clubs was a friendly on 22 March 1866. The match was a 0–0 draw and was probably on the Forest Recreation Ground.

The first competitive meeting in the FA Cup came on 16 November 1878 and resulted in a 3–1 victory for Nottingham Forest. The first league game occurred on 8 October 1892 and resulted in a 3–1 victory for Notts County.

The last league Nottingham derby occurred on 12 February 1994 and resulted in a 2–1 victory for Notts County. Charlie Palmer (or 'Sir' Charlie Palmer as he has been dubbed by Notts County fans) scored with just four minutes remaining and only ninety seconds after Forest had equalised. The date, 12 February, is now known to local fans as Charlie Palmer Day.

Comparative table positions of Nottingham Forest and Notts County in the English football league system

The rivalry was resurrected on 9 August 2011, when the clubs met in the first round of the Football League Cup at the City Ground, with Forest winning a penalty shootout after the match had ended 3–3.

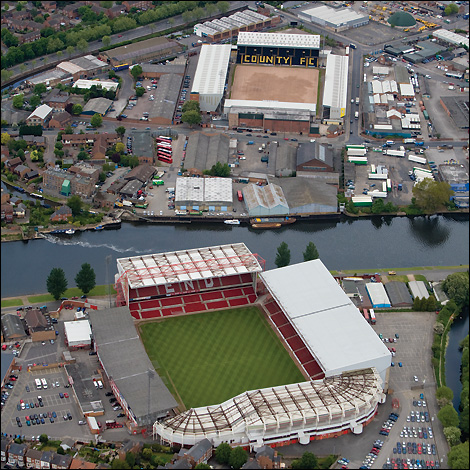
Aerial image of the two club's grounds

The two clubs rarely meet as they are in different tiers of the league system and supporters generally view other regional clubs as more prominent rivals. However, recent years have seen incidents of trouble between supporters. In 2007, a 'friendly' match between the clubs saw violence erupt after the final whistle. And in 2017, several followers of both sides were convicted of taking part in a prearranged mass brawl in a pub in Nottingham. Another friendly match the previous summer also saw four arrests. Trouble broke out once again at a pre-season 'friendly' in July 2022, with fighting between County fans and Forest fans sat in the home end spilling on to the pitch. The game ended in a 2–2 draw. The teams met again in July 2023 and July 2026 with Forest coming out respectively 1-0 and 2-0 winners.

== Statistics ==
The two clubs have met a total of 94 times in the League, FA Cup and League Cup. The two sides have contested games in a number of other competitions including the Nottinghamshire County Senior Cup and the Anglo-Italian Cup. The results and statistics from those games are not included below.

Competition	County wins	Draws	Forest wins	County goals	Forest goals
League	28	23	35	99	114
FA Cup	2	1	3	10	11
League Cup	0	1	1	3	7
Total	30	25	41	112	132

=== League ===
==== Notts County at home ====
Date	Venue	Score	Competition
8 October 1892	Trent Bridge	3–0	First Division
9 October 1897	Trent Bridge	1–3	First Division
8 October 1898	Trent Bridge	2–2	First Division
11 November 1899	Trent Bridge	1–2	First Division
26 December 1900	Trent Bridge	1–0	First Division
16 November 1901	Trent Bridge	3–0	First Division
26 December 1902	Trent Bridge	1–1	First Division
28 November 1903	Trent Bridge	1–3	First Division
25 March 1905	Trent Bridge	1–2	First Division
4 November 1905	Trent Bridge	1–1	First Division
4 April 1908	Trent Bridge	2–0	First Division
21 November 1908	Trent Bridge	3–0	First Division
8 January 1910	Trent Bridge	4–1	First Division
3 September 1910	Meadow Lane	1–1	First Division
25 December 1913	Meadow Lane	2–2	Second Division
18 September 1920	Meadow Lane	2–0	Second Division
5 November 1921	Meadow Lane	1–1	Second Division
22 September 1923	Meadow Lane	2–1	First Division
20 September 1924	Meadow Lane	0–0	First Division
18 September 1926	Meadow Lane	1–2	Second Division
22 February 1928	Meadow Lane	1–2	Second Division
20 October 1928	Meadow Lane	1–1	Second Division
4 January 1930	Meadow Lane	0–0	Second Division
13 February 1932	Meadow Lane	2–6	Second Division
8 October 1932	Meadow Lane	2–4	Second Division
17 February 1934	Meadow Lane	1–0	Second Division
29 September 1934	Meadow Lane	3–5	Second Division
22 April 1950	Meadow Lane	2–0	Third Division (South)
15 September 1951	Meadow Lane	2–2	Second Division
30 August 1952	Meadow Lane	3–2	Second Division
27 February 1954	Meadow Lane	1–1	Second Division
12 February 1955	Meadow Lane	4–1	Second Division
11 February 1956	Meadow Lane	1–3	Second Division
20 October 1956	Meadow Lane	1–2	Second Division
26 December 1974	Meadow Lane	0–1	Second Division
25 March 1975	Meadow Lane	2–2	Second Division
13 April 1976	Meadow Lane	0–0	Second Division
9 April 1977	Meadow Lane	1–1	Second Division
12 April 1982	Meadow Lane	1–2	First Division
4 December 1982	Meadow Lane	3–2	First Division
31 March 1984	Meadow Lane	0–0	First Division
24 August 1991	Meadow Lane	0–4	First Division
12 February 1994	Meadow Lane	2–1	First Division (tier 2)

==== Nottingham Forest at home ====
Date	Venue	Score	Competition
25 February 1893	Trent Bridge	3–1	First Division
4 September 1897	Trent Bridge	1–1	First Division
4 February 1899	City Ground	0–0	First Division
17 March 1900	City Ground	0–3	First Division
24 November 1900	City Ground	5–0	First Division
26 December 1901	City Ground	1–0	First Division
15 November 1902	City Ground	0–0	First Division
26 December 1903	City Ground	0–1	First Division
26 November 1904	City Ground	2–1	First Division
26 December 1905	City Ground	1–2	First Division
7 December 1907	City Ground	2–0	First Division
27 March 1909	City Ground	1–0	First Division
4 September 1909	City Ground	2–1	First Division
26 December 1910	City Ground	0–2	First Division
31 December 1913	City Ground	1–0	Second Division
11 September 1920	City Ground	1–0	Second Division
14 November 1921	City Ground	0–0	Second Division
29 September 1923	City Ground	1–0	First Division
24 January 1925	City Ground	0–0	First Division
5 February 1927	City Ground	2–0	Second Division
17 September 1927	City Ground	2–1	Second Division
2 March 1929	City Ground	1–2	Second Division
7 September 1929	City Ground	1–1	Second Division
3 October 1931	City Ground	2–1	Second Division
18 February 1933	City Ground	3–0	Second Division
7 October 1934	City Ground	2–0	Second Division
9 February 1935	City Ground	2–3	Second Division
3 December 1949	City Ground	1–2	Third Division (South)
10 October 1953	City Ground	3–2	Second Division
3 January 1953	City Ground	1–0	Second Division
10 October 1953	City Ground	5–0	Second Division
25 September 1954	City Ground	0–1	Second Division
1 October 1955	City Ground	0–2	Second Division
1 May 1957	City Ground	2–4	Second Division
3 March 1974	City Ground	0–0	Second Division
28 December 1974	City Ground	0–2	Second Division
30 August 1975	City Ground	0–1	Second Division
8 March 1977	City Ground	1–2	Second Division
23 January 1982	City Ground	0–2	First Division
23 April 1983	City Ground	2–1	First Division
16 October 1983	City Ground	3–1	First Division
11 January 1992	City Ground	1–1	First Division
30 October 1993	City Ground	1–0	First Division (tier 2)

=== Cup matches ===
Date	Venue	Matches				Competition
Date	Venue	Team 1	Score		Team 2	Competition
16 November 1878	Trent Bridge	Notts County	1–3		Nottingham Forest	FA Cup
8 November 1879	Trent Bridge	Nottingham Forest	4–0		Notts County	FA Cup
1 December 1883	Trent Bridge	Notts County	3–0		Nottingham Forest	FA Cup
26 November 1887	Trent Bridge	Nottingham Forest	2–1		Notts County	FA Cup
24 February 1894	Trent Bridge	Nottingham Forest	1–1		Notts County	FA Cup
3 March 1894	Trent Bridge	Notts County	4–1		Nottingham Forest	FA Cup
25 October 1977	City Ground	Nottingham Forest	4–0		Notts County	League Cup
9 August 2011	City Ground	Nottingham Forest	3–3	(4–3 p)	Notts County	League Cup

== Friendlies ==
While competitive meetings between the two sides have been rare in the 21st century, the clubs occasionally meet in pre-season fixtures. On 18 July 2026, Nottingham Forest defeated Notts County 2–0 in a pre-season friendly at Meadow Lane, with goals from Igor Jesus and Arnaud Kalimuendo.
