= Ike McGorian =

English footballer (born 1901)

Personal information
- Full name: Isaac Moor McGorian
- Date of birth: 19 October 1901
- Place of birth: Silksworth, England
- Position: Wing half

Senior career*
Years	Team	Apps	(Gls)
1923–1924	Thornley Albion		
1924–1925	Silksworth Colliery		
1925–1928	Sunderland	20	(1)
1928–1929	Notts County	1	(0)
1929–1931	Carlisle United	3	(0)
1931–1932	Shotton Colliery Welfare		
1932–1933	Thurnscoe Victoria		
1933–193?	Thurnscoe St Hilda's		
- * Club domestic league appearances and goals

Isaac Moor McGorian (born 19 October 1901) was an English professional footballer who played as a wing half for Sunderland.
