= Bagnall =

Bagnall may refer to:

- Bagnall, Michigan, an unincorporated community
- Bagnall, Ontario, Canada
- Bagnall, Staffordshire, England
- Lansing Bagnall, British forklift truck manufacturing company
- W. G. Bagnall, British locomotive manufacturing company
- Bagnall Beach Observatory, astronomical observatory on the east coast of Australia

== People ==
- Andrew Bagnall (born 1947), New Zealand motor racing driver
- Anthony Bagnall (born 1945), Royal Air Force commander
- Bill Bagnall (1926–2006), American magazine publisher and editor
- Charles Bagnall (1827–1884), British Politician
- Drew Bagnall (born 1983), Canadian ice hockey player
- Geoff Bagnall (born 1965), Australian rugby league footballer
- George Bagnall (1883–1964), British trade unionist
- Gibbons Bagnall (1719–1800), English poetical writer
- Graham Bagnall (1912–1986), New Zealand librarian, bibliographer and historian
- Hamer Bagnall (1904–1974), English cricketer
- James Bagnall (1783–1855), Canadian printer, publisher and politician
- James Eustace Bagnall (1830–1918), English botanist
- Jim Bagnall (fl. 1996–2011), Canadian politician from Prince Edward Island
- Joshua L. Bagnall (19th century), English songwriter
- Lemuel Bagnall (1844–1917), New Zealand businessman and politician
- Leone Bagnall (1933–2017), Canadian politician from Prince Edward Island
- Nigel Bagnall (1927–2002), British Army commander
- Richard Siddoway Bagnall (1889–1962), English entomologist
- Roger S. Bagnall (born 1947), professor of classics at Columbia University
- Walter Bagnall (died 1631), settler of Richmond Island, Maine
- Walter Bagnall (1903–1984), Canadian Anglican bishop
- William Bagnall (1882–1950), New Zealand-born Australian politician
- William Gordon Bagnall (1852–1907), British founder of a locomotive manufacturing company

== See also ==
- Bagenal
- Bagnal
- Bagnall-Oakeley
- Bagnell (disambiguation)
- Bignall (disambiguation)
