= Bignell =

Bignell may refer to:

== People with the surname ==
- Arthur Bignell (1861–1944), former mayor of Whanganui, New Zealand
- Bernie Bignell (1917–1967), Australian rules footballer
- George Bignell (1858–1925), American baseball player
- George Carter Bignell (1826–1910), English entomologist
- Guy Bignell (1886–1965), English cricketer
- Hugh Bignell (1882–1907), Indian born English cricketer
- Joseph Maltby Bignell (1827–1887), British architect
- Larry Bignell (born 1950), retired professional Ice hockey defenceman from Edmonton, Alberta, Canada
- Leon Bignell (born 1966), Australian politician
- Mark Bignell (born in 1979), US politician
- Richard Bignell (disambiguation), one of several people
- Roderick Bignell Weir (1927–2021), New Zealand businessman
- Tim Bignell, Australian bass guitarist from the band Epicure
- Kevin Sacre (born Kevin Bignell in 1978), British actor

== Place names ==
- Bignell, Nebraska, a community in the United States
- Bignell Creek, a tributary of Adolphe-Poisson Bay, in La Tuque, Mauricie, Quebec, Canada

== See also ==
- Bagnell (disambiguation)
- Bignall (disambiguation)
