= Bagnall-Oakeley =

Bagnall-Oakeley is a double-barrelled name. Notable people with the name include:

- Mary Ellen Bagnall-Oakeley (1833–1904), English antiquarian, author, and painter
- Richard Bagnall-Oakeley (1865–1947), Welsh archer who competed at the 1908 Summer Olympics

== See also ==
- Bagnall (disambiguation)
- Oakeley
