= Clifton Antiquarian Club =

British archaeological society

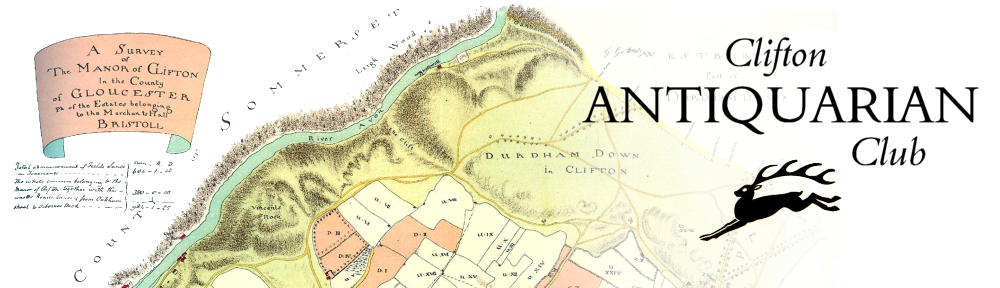
- Formation: 23 January 1884; 142 years ago
- Type: Archaeological society
- Purpose: Investigation of antiquities
- Headquarters: 9 Kewstoke Road, Stoke Bishop, Bristol, BS9 1HA, England
- Chair: Peter Fenn
- Vice-Chair: Laurie Waite
- Treasurer: John Swann
- Additional Committee Members: Donovan Hawley and Ellie McQueen
- Website: www.cliftonantiquarian.co.uk

The Clifton Antiquarian Club is an archaeological society founded in 1884 in Bristol to investigate antiquities in the surrounding areas of western England and southern Wales. The 28 years of research undertaken by the members and associates of the original society fill the first seven volumes of the Proceedings of the Clifton Antiquarian Club. The original club was dissolved in 1912, but it was resurrected in 2006. Four additional volumes of Proceedings have been published by the club in its current incarnation.

== Founding ==
The Clifton Antiquarian Club was established on 23 January 1884 in Bristol. The impetus for its formation was a letter that had circulated among archaeologists and others in the Clifton area of Bristol suggesting that an antiquarian club be formed. The first meeting was held at the Bristol Museum and Library (now the Bristol City Museum and Art Gallery), and was attended by 23 men from the community. Bishop William Clifford was elected president and Alfred Edmund Hudd secretary. Two vice-presidents and a treasurer were also chosen. The club's mission was the investigation of antiquities in the surrounding area, which included not only western England, but also southern Wales. The club decided to limit membership to 40 men at any given time, although there could also be up to ten honorary members. Many of the members lived in the Clifton area of Bristol. While women could interact on a limited basis with the club, they were not formal members. The first meeting included a presentation by John Taylor, Bristol City Librarian. He read his research paper "Anglo-Norman Church Doorways" to the assembled men.

== Presidents ==
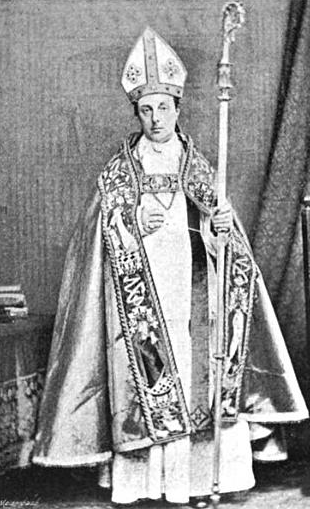
Bishop William Joseph Hugh Clifford (1823–1893), first president

The first president, William Joseph Hugh Clifford (1823–1893), was ordained as a priest in August 1850 by Archbishop Errington in Clifton. He was appointed Bishop of Clifton, and in February 1857 was consecrated by Pope Pius IX in Rome. He served as president from 1884 until his death on 14 August 1893. He also served as a vice-president of the Bristol and Gloucestershire Archaeological Society and the Somersetshire Archaeological Society, now the Somerset Archaeological and Natural History Society, publishing papers in both of their journals.

After the bishop's death, a new president was not chosen until the following year, when one of the club's founding members, James Roger Bramble (1841–1908), succeeded in the role. A solicitor, he was the force behind the creation of St Vincent Lodge No. 1404 of Bristol. Former Lieutenant Colonel of the Second Gloucester Royal Engineer Volunteers, Bramble was elected president on 10 January 1894 at the 10th annual meeting, and served until 1899. He had previously served as treasurer from 1884 to 1887, and as a vice-president from 1887 to 1893, and had contributed several papers to the Proceedings. He died on 3 February 1908 at Weston-super-Mare.

George Forrest Browne (1833–1930), Bishop of Stepney, became Bishop of Bristol in 1897. He had been an explorer of ice caves in France and Switzerland as a young man, and was the author of a number of books. Bishop Browne was the Disney Professor of Archaeology at the University of Cambridge. He was also a vice-president of the Society of Antiquaries of London. He was elected a member of the Clifton Antiquarian Club on 24 November 1897. Despite his relatively short tenure as a member, he was elected president at the 15th annual meeting on 19 January 1899, serving until January 1903.

At the 19th annual meeting of the club, held on 21 January 1903, Conwy Lloyd Morgan (1852–1936) was elected president to succeed the Bishop of Bristol. Morgan had been elected principal of University College, Bristol in 1887. He resigned three years later on 31 January 1906, proposing that his predecessor, the Bishop of Bristol, be re-elected president. In 1910, the university charter of the University College, Bristol was granted, and he agreed to accept a vice-chancellorship on a temporary basis, with the understanding that he would resume the chair of his department. Initially appointed the chairman of the geology and zoology department in 1884, he became the chair of the psychology and ethics department after his 1910 vice-chancellorship. He retired in 1919, living in Clifton until 1925 or 1926. He moved to Hastings, where he died in 1936.

On 31 January 1906, at the 22nd annual meeting of the club, George Forrest Browne was re-elected president. He was again re-elected in 1907 and 1908, and served at the time of the club's dissolution in 1912. He died on 1 June 1930.

== Alfred Hudd, Secretary ==
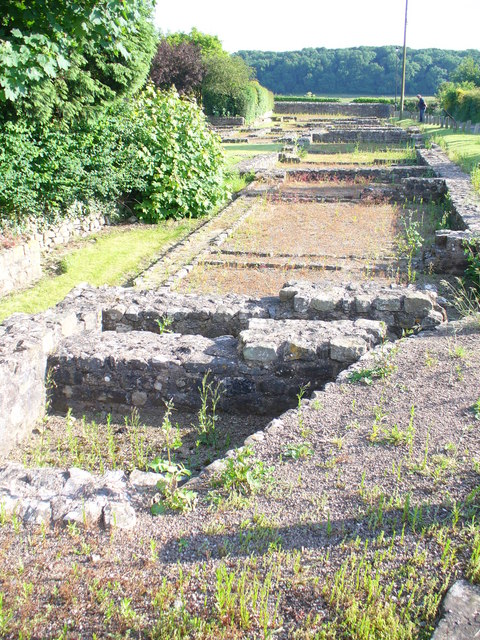
Excavations at Caerwent in south Wales

The secretary of the club, Alfred Edmund Hudd of Pembroke Road in Clifton, retained that position during all twenty-eight years of the original society. He had the distinction of being the only member to remain with the organisation from its inception in 1884 until its end in 1912. He served as editor of the society's seven volumes of Proceedings. He also contributed 21 papers to the journal. His service to the organisation was acknowledged on 5 January 1898 when the club presented him with a silver bowl and a set of four silver candlesticks. In 1911, the membership again presented him with a tribute, an inscribed, inlaid grandfather clock.

Hudd was also a member of the Bristol and Gloucestershire Archaeological Society. In addition, he was a Fellow of the Society of Antiquaries of London, and was closely involved with the Caerwent Exploration Fund. At a meeting of the Society of Antiquaries in February 1899, Alfred Trice Martin, a founding member of the Clifton Antiquarian Club and a Fellow of the Society of Antiquaries, had proposed a systematic excavation of Caerwent, a Roman town in south Wales. The Caerwent Exploration Fund was established by the Clifton Antiquarian Club shortly thereafter, in 1899. In September of that year, at Caerwent, Godfrey Morgan, Lord Tredegar, was elected President of the Fund, and Alfred Hudd was elected Treasurer. Alfred Hudd and Thomas Ashby, Junior, both members of the executive committee of the Fund, supervised the excavations. During the period between 1899 and 1913, two-thirds of the Roman town was revealed. The archive of Caerwent, excavated by the Caerwent Exploration Fund, is in the archaeology collection of Newport Museum. The reports on the Caerwent excavation were published in Archaeologia, the journal of the Society of Antiquaries.

== Lectures ==
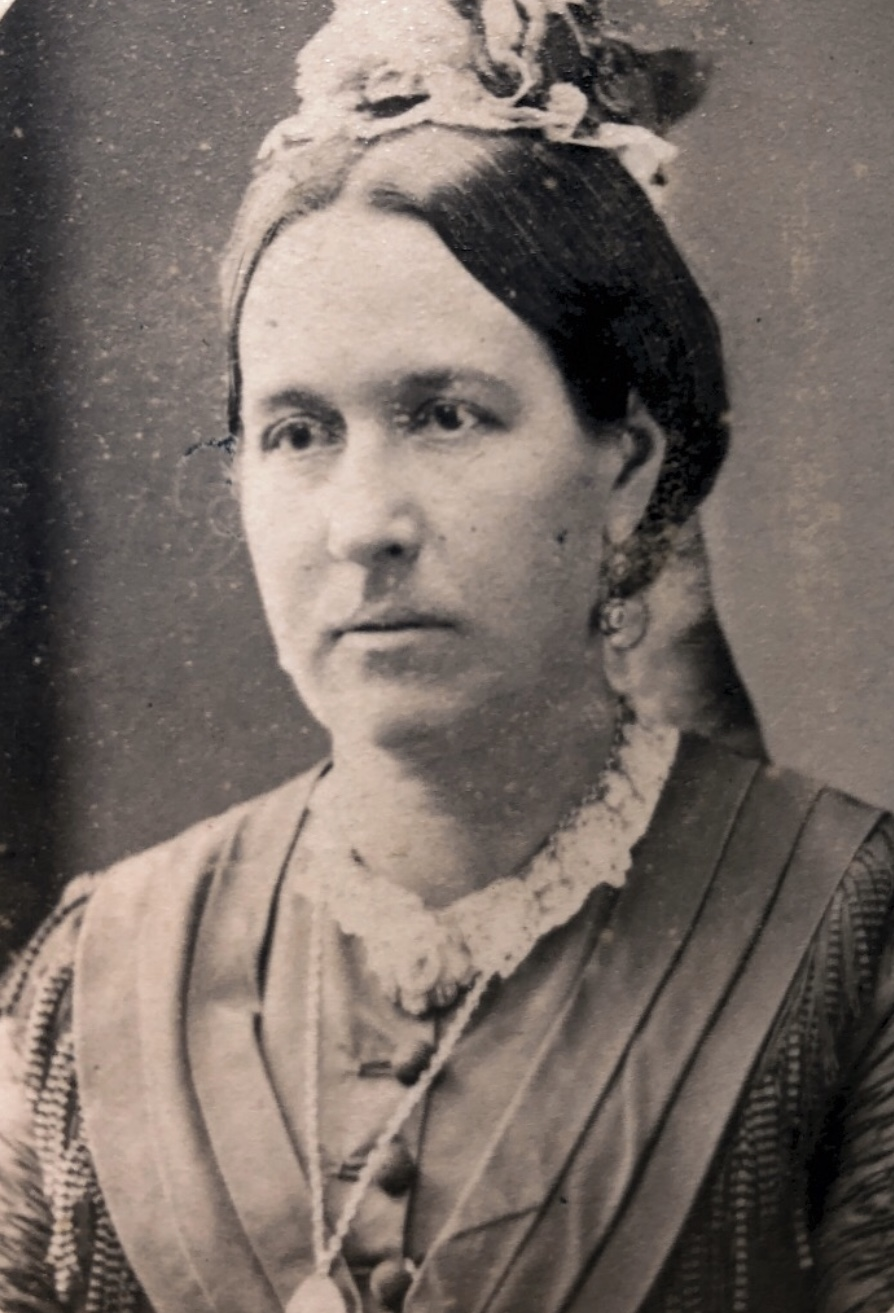
Mary Ellen Bagnall-Oakeley

It was decided at the first meeting of the Clifton Antiquarian Club that at least two meetings would be held every year. One of those general meetings would be scheduled for January of each year. At that annual meeting, election of officers and new members would take place. Members and, occasionally, associates of the club, male and female, made presentations to the society at its meetings. Their papers were read to the membership and eventually published in its Proceedings. With a total of 21 papers, Alfred E. Hudd was one of the most prolific contributors to the Proceedings.

Although her husband Reverend William Oakeley was a member of the society, heiress and antiquarian Mary Ellen Bagnall-Oakeley was never invited to be a member. However, as a friend of the club, she made presentations, and did so even before her husband became a member in 1891. The five papers that she submitted to the Proceedings cover the period from 1887 (Volume 1) to 1896 (Volume 3). In chronological order, they include:

- "Notes on the Stitches Employed in the Embroidery of the Copes." (Appendix to 20 December 1887, appeared in Volume 1)
- "Notes on Round Towers." (Read on 12 October 1891, appeared in Volume 2)
- "Early Christian Settlements in Ireland." (Read on 20 November 1893, appeared in Volume 3)
- "A Week in the Aran Islands." (Read on 22 November 1894, appeared in Volume 3)
- "On a Great Hoard of Roman Coins." (Read on 28 January 1896, appeared in Volume 3)

Other women who contributed papers to the Proceedings included E. Hodges (read on 19 June 1894, appeared in Volume 3) and Ida M. Roper (read on 8 November 1905, appeared in Volume 6; second presentation in Volume 7).

== Excursions ==
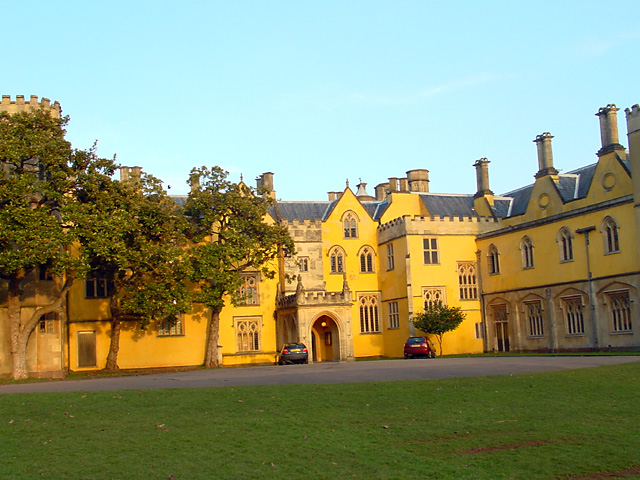
Ashton Court, one of the sites visited during the first excursion on 29 May 1884

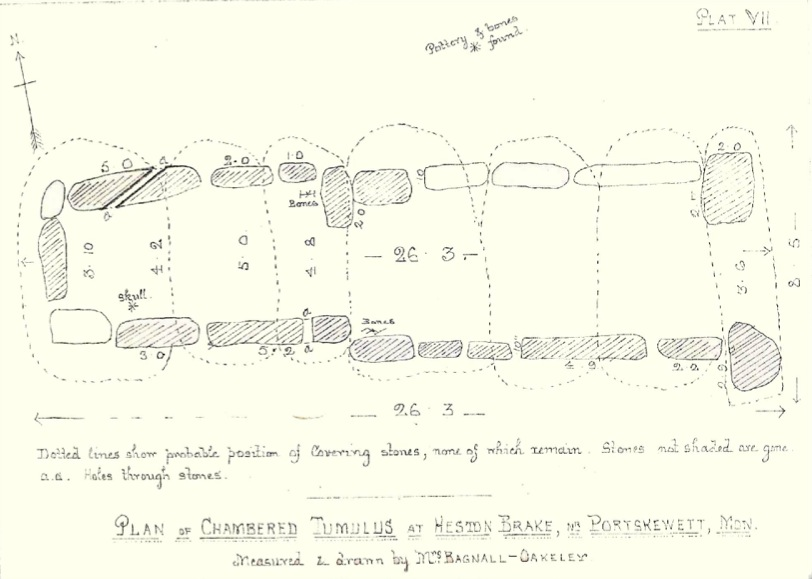
Plan of chambered tumulus at Heston Brake in Portskewett, Monmouthshire, 1888

It was also decided at the first meeting of the club that two excursions would be held every year. Women were allowed to attend as the guests. The club's first excursion took place on 29 May 1884. Thirty members and friends visited the Ashton Court mansion and estate at the outskirts of Bristol. The group then inspected Long Ashton Church and the Ashton Cross. Later, the club ventured to churches and houses in Somerset, including Barrow Gurney, Stanton Drew, Chew Magna, and Dundry. They also toured the earthworks at Maes Knoll, the remains of a univallate hillfort from the Iron Age.

Women not only accompanied men on the day trips; sometimes they actively participated in the investigations. On 20 July 1889, the club undertook an excursion to Tintern Abbey and Monmouth. Bagnall-Oakeley and her husband served as guides for the Monmouth portion of the excursion. The group visited St Thomas Church, the gatehouse on the Monnow Bridge, the ruins of Monmouth Castle, the Church of St Mary, and "Geoffrey's" Window.

Another example of this was the project sponsored jointly by the Clifton Antiquarian Club and the Monmouthshire and Caerleon Antiquarian Association on 22 August 1888. The excursion is described in editor Alfred Edmund Hudd's postscript to the 1888 paper authored by the Reverend William Oakeley, "The Chambered Tumulus at Heston Brake, Monmouthshire", found in Volume 2 of the Proceedings of the Clifton Antiquarian Club. On that day, the tumulus at the site Heston Brake in Portskewett was opened and examined under the direction of the members of the two associations. There was evidence that the tumulus had been previously disturbed. The few relics which remained, fragments of pottery and human bones and teeth, are now in the Caerleon Museum, the National Roman Legion Museum. At the time of that 1888 excavation, Bagnall Oakeley made measurements of all the components of the tumulus. Her illustration (pictured), which accompanies her husband's paper, is entitled, "Plan of Chambered Tumulus at Heston Brake, nr Portskewett, Mon."

== Original Proceedings ==
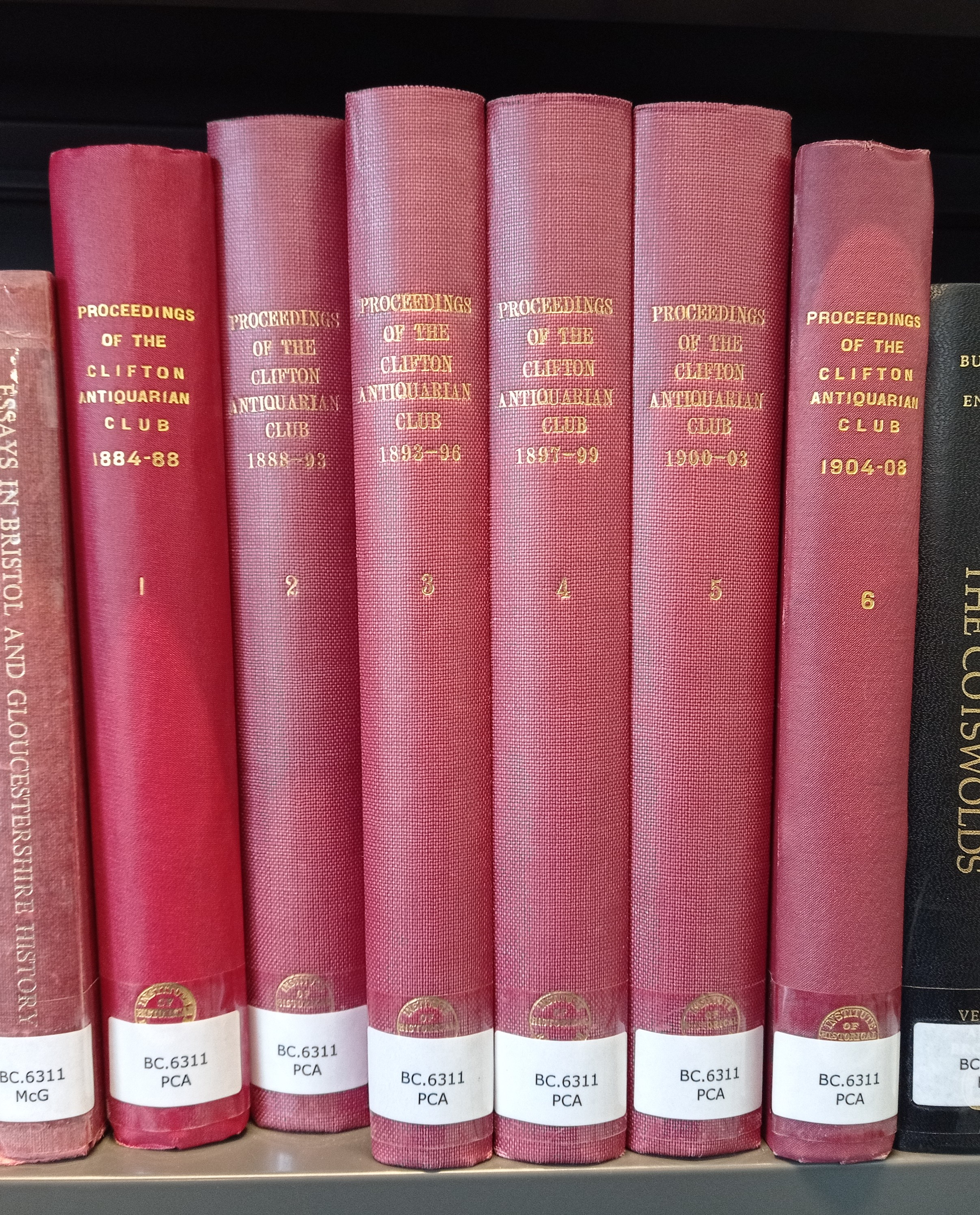
Proceedings of the Clifton Antiquarian Club

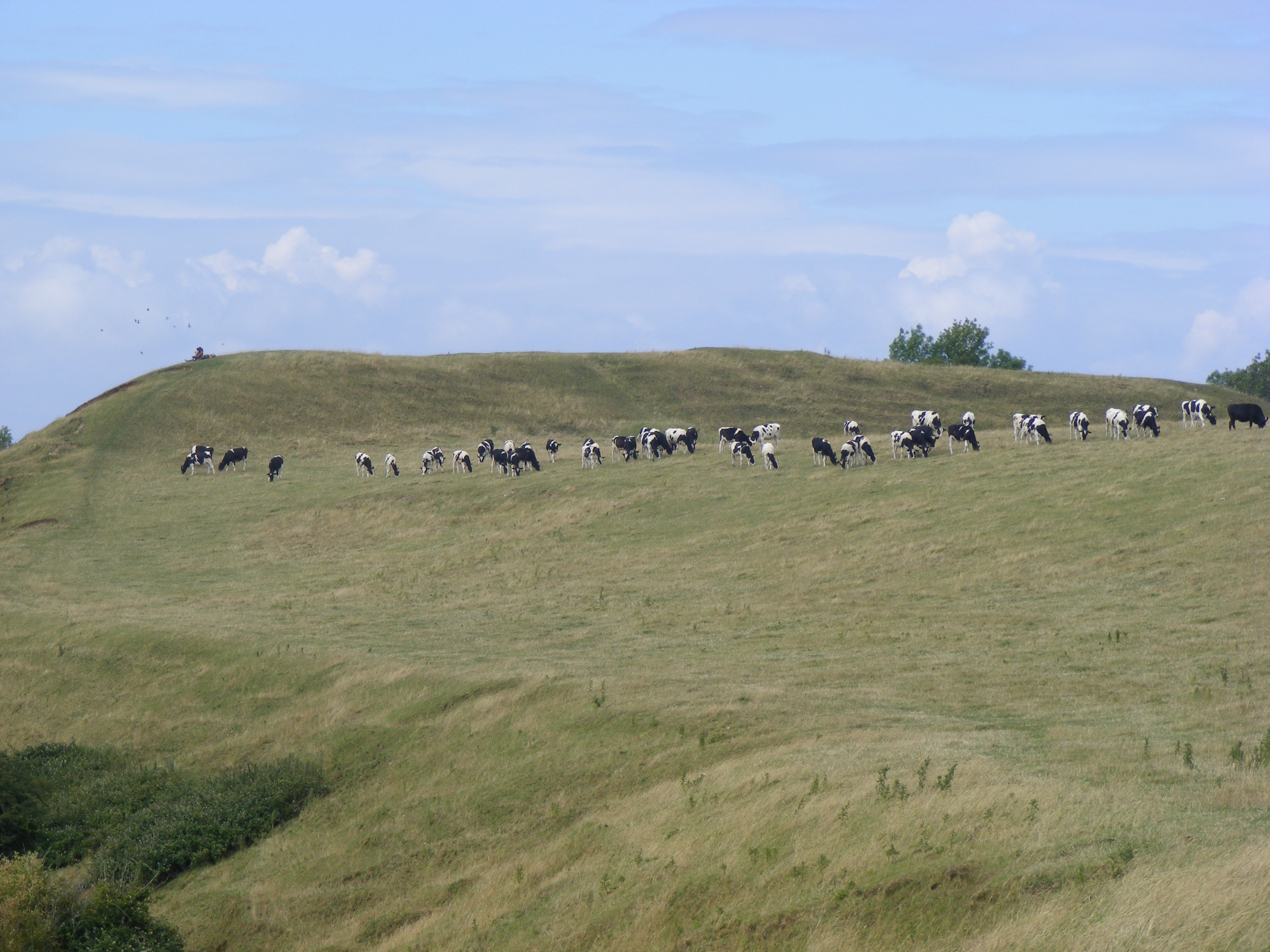
The earthworks at Maes Knoll, the remains of a univallate hillfort from the Iron Age in Somerset, toured on the first, 1884 excursion of the Clifton Antiquarian Club

The 28 years of research presented by the members and associates of the club were compiled in seven volumes of Proceedings. At the time of dissolution of the society, an attempt was made to find a buyer for the hundreds of volumes of Proceedings that they had in stock. The club was offered £9 10s by a bookseller, but that offer was declined. Today, a single seven-volume set of the original leather-bound Proceedings sells for more than £500.

The seven volumes of the original Proceedings are as follows:

No.	Years Covered	Year Published	Editor
Volume 1	1884–1888	1888	Alfred E. Hudd
Volume 2	1888–1893	1893	Alfred E. Hudd
Volume 3	1893–1896	1897	Alfred E. Hudd
Volume 4	1897–1899	1900	Alfred E. Hudd
Volume 5	1900–1903	1904	Alfred E. Hudd
Volume 6	1904–1908	1908	Alfred E. Hudd
Volume 7	1908–1912	1912	Alfred E. Hudd

== Dissolution ==
The membership of the club dwindled through retirement or death, and it was formally dissolved on 15 January 1912. The occasion was its 28th annual general meeting. At the invitation of Bishop George Forrest Browne, then president, the final meeting was held at the Bishop's Palace in Redland Green. The palace was later destroyed during a bombing raid on 2 December 1940.

== Revival ==
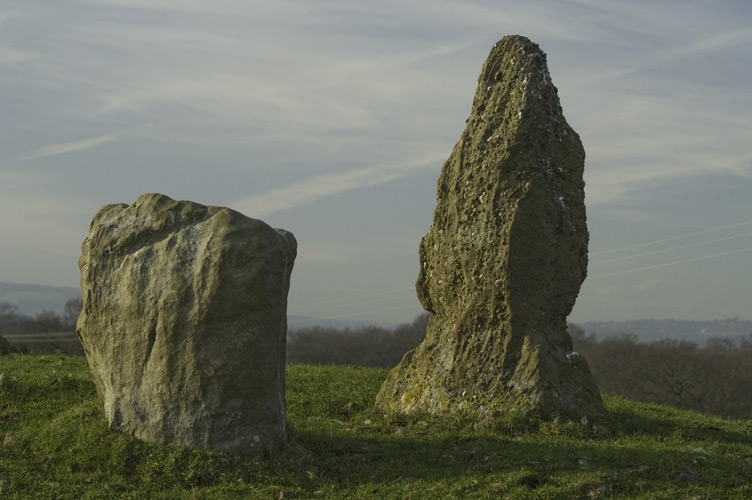
Heston Brake, Portskewett, site of 1888 excursion and impetus for 2006 Clifton Antiquarian Club resurrection

In June 2006, an excursion to the Heston Brake chambered tumulus site in Portskewett led to mention of the original Clifton Antiquarian Club. Heston Brake, the site of the August 1888 excursion, proved to be the inspiration for the resurrection of the Clifton Antiquarian Club as it exists today. A complete set of the seven volumes of the original Proceedings was obtained and examined. The decision was made to adhere to the primary objectives of the original society. A major departure from the old version of the club, however, was inclusion of women in the membership, such that women now comprise 50% of the members. Other changes include a new junior section of the society, CAC Kids, with child-friendly activities. In addition, there is an increasingly comprehensive website on which some of the publications from the original Proceedings are available. The new version of the Clifton Antiquarian Club was incorporated on 12 October 2006. It is located at 9 Kewstoke Road, Stoke Bishop, Bristol, BS9 1HA, England.

== Recent lectures ==
Lectures are held throughout the year, to which both members and non-members are welcome. The subject of the talks generally alternates between the prehistoric and medieval eras. The lectures that have been given by the current version of the Clifton Antiquarian Club include:

No.	Date	Lecturer	Title
1	January 2007	Dr. Christopher Chippindale	Philip Crocker – Learning and illustration: A 19th century view of prehistoric south west Britain
2	June 2007	Dr Volker Heyd	The Emergence of Complex Societies in the south east of Europe
3	January 2008	Dr Angelo Fossati	The Rock Art Tradition of Valcamonica, North Italy: A World Heritage view
4	June 2008	Dr Tim Malim	Dykes, Death and Disease: the frontiers of Anglo-Saxon migration
5	January 2009	Professor Mark Horton	The Cannibals of Thornbury – an intriguing account of violence and butchery in the Iron Age
6	June 2009	Dr Michael Costen	Common-fields and the Agricultural Revolution in Somerset 900–1100 AD
7	January 2010	Dr Jean Clottes	The Cave Paintings of Chauvet
8	June 2010	Professor David Austin	Castles on the Edge: The Experience of Medieval Borderlands
9	January 2011	Professor Richard Bradley	Stages and Screens: Rethinking the Henge Monuments of Northern Britain
10	June 2011	Professor Howard Williams	Shipping Hel: The topography and necrogeography of a Viking boat-grave cemetery
11	January 2012	Dr Philip de Jersey	Different Iron Ages: the archaeology of the Channel Islands in the late first millennium BC
12	September 2012	Simon West	The Romanisation of St Albans & district
13	May 2013	Dr Keith Wilkinson	The Hrazdan Valley Palaeolithic Project 2008-12
14	November 2013	Dr Clive Bond	The Sweet Track: a Neolithic water cult?
15	April 2014	Dr Jacqueline Cahill Wilson	What did the Romans ever do for us?
16	November 2014	Neil Holbrook	The Cemeteries of Roman Cirencester
17	July 2015	Professor Alex Bentley	Neolithic Kinship, Land Use and Community Differentiation
18	April 2016	Julian Richards	Stonehenge: the story so far
19	May 2016	Win Scutt	Dartmoor and Beyond: Upland and Lowland Landscape in Devon's Prehistory
20	June 2017	Dr Paula Gardiner	Crossing the Water: hunter-gatherers in a changing world
21	October 2017	Vince Russett	Castles in the Mist
22	February 2018	Louise Tizzard and David Howell	Beneath the Waves: investigating submerged landscapes of the southern North Sea
23	March 2019	Steve Tofts	Zooarchaeology
24	October 2019	Dr Amanda Chadburn	Stonehenge: The Story of a World Heritage Site, between 1992 and 2013

== Recent excursions ==
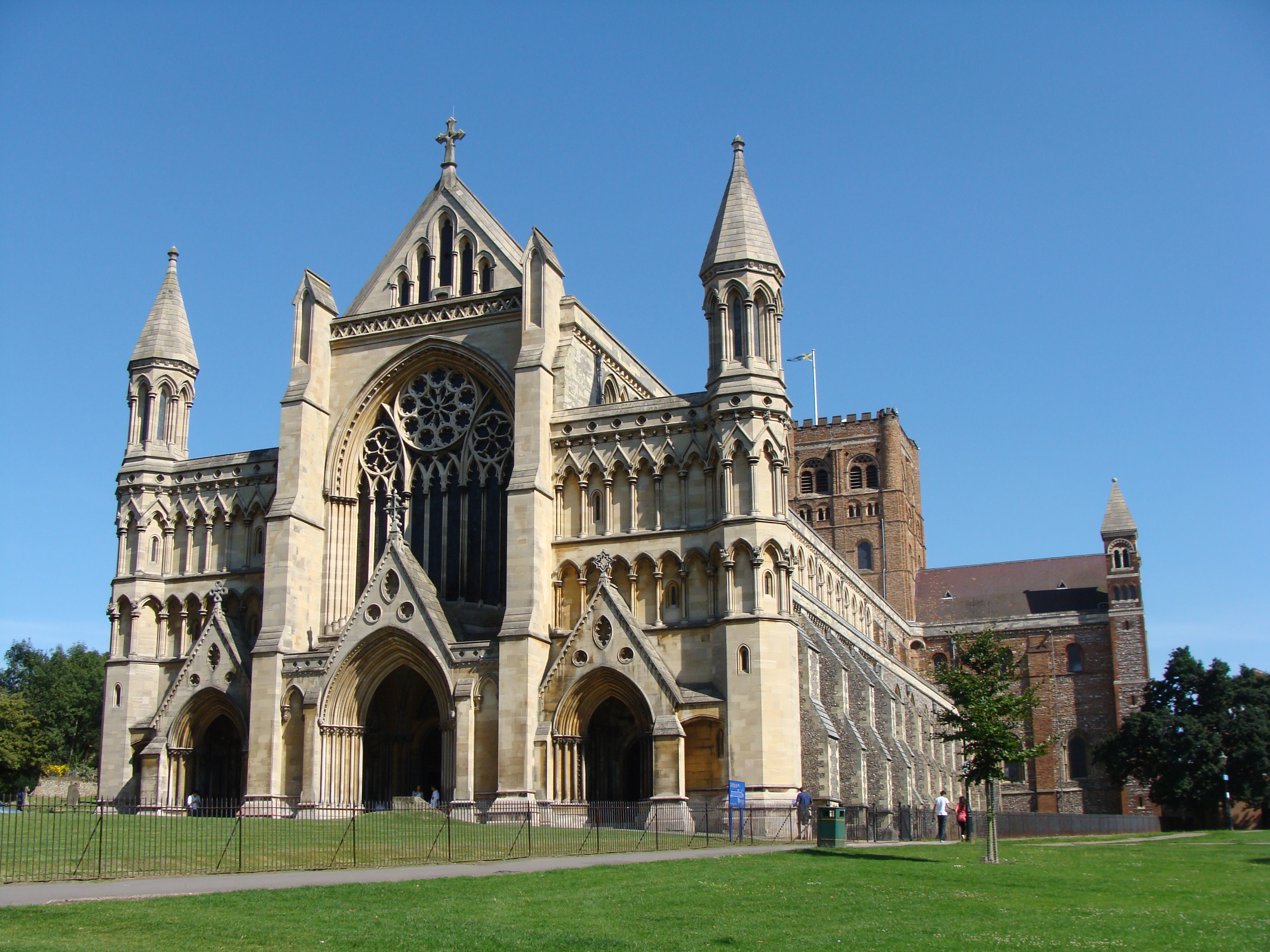
St Albans Cathedral

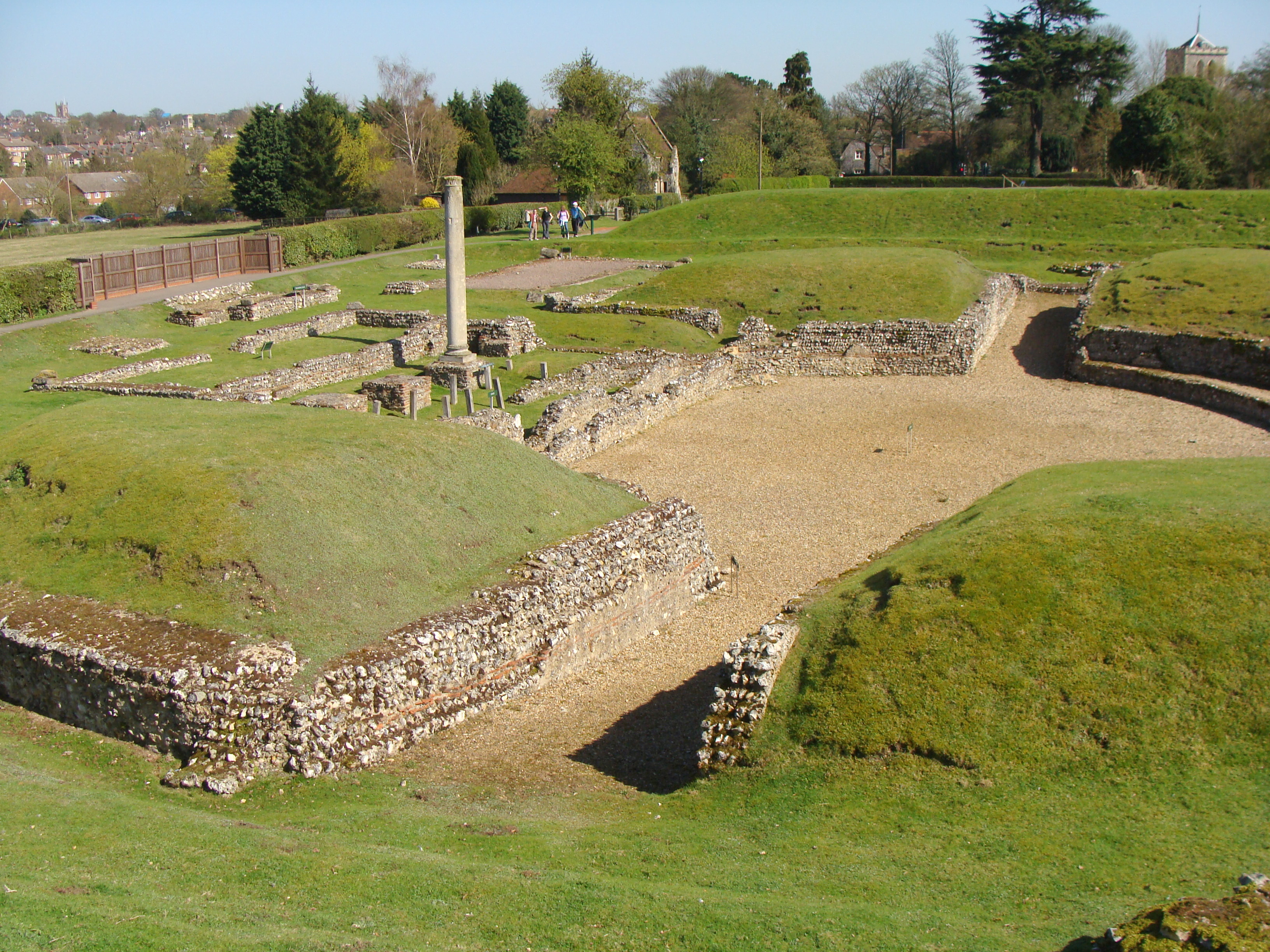
Roman theatre at Verulamium

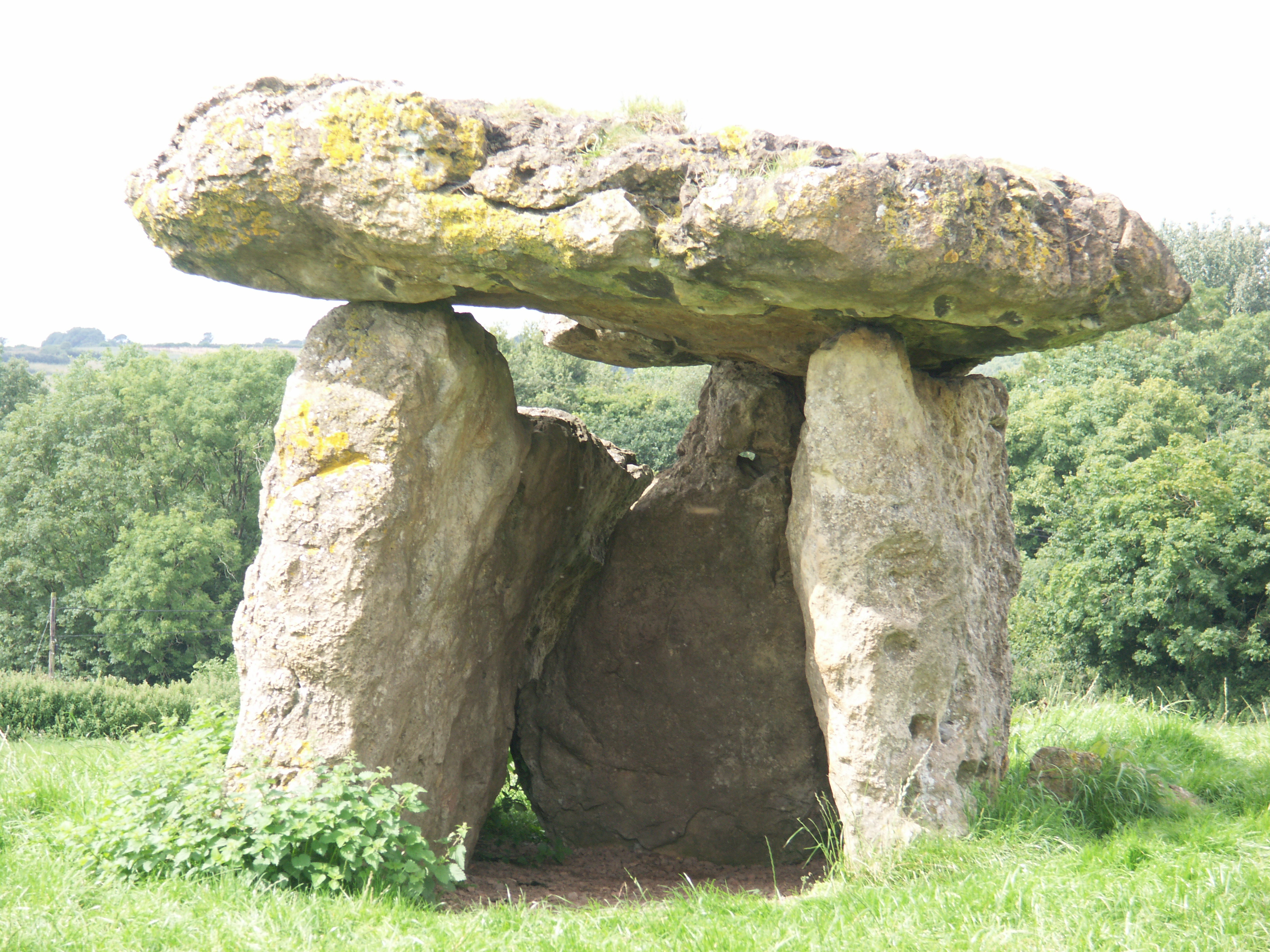
St Lythans burial chamber

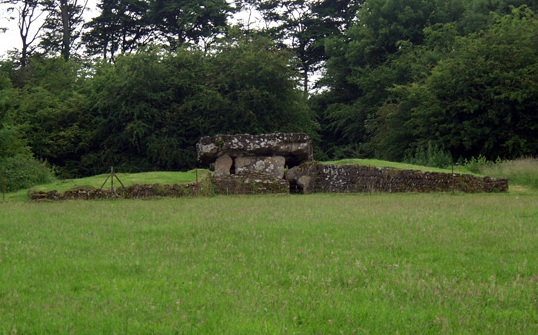
Tinkinswood Burial Chamber

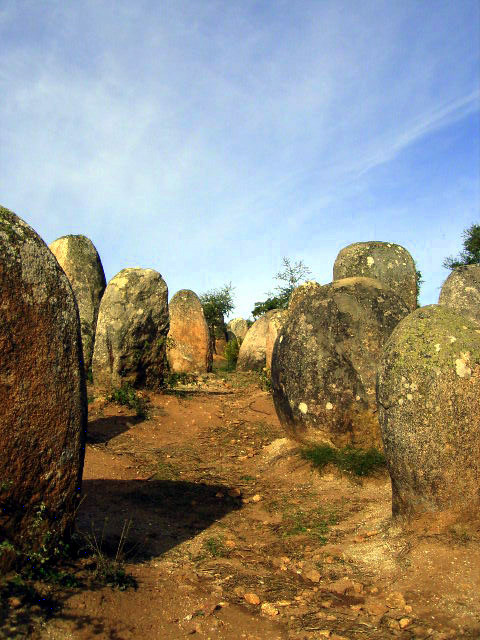
Cromeleque dos Almendres stone setting near Évora, Portugal

In addition, at least two excursions are scheduled by the Clifton Antiquarian Club each year; some are day trips, others are longer tours. During the September 2010 excursion to the Gower Peninsula, Dr George Nash of the University of Bristol and other members of the club discovered a carving of a reindeer in one of the caves. This represents the second discovery of Upper Palaeolithic rock art in the British Isles, and the first in Wales. Carbon dating has placed the carving at approximately 12,600 years, although Dr Nash believes it to be older. The carving may represent the oldest specimen of rock art in the British Isles.

The excursions, which have been undertaken the last thirteen years include:

No.	Date	Location	Notes
1	July 2009	Oxford, Oxfordshire	Research Laboratory for Archaeology & the History of Art
2	September 2009	Erme Valley, Dartmoor, Devon	The longest stone row
3	October/November 2009	Dorset	Pimperne long barrow, Colliton Park, Maiden Castle, Portland Castle, Nine Stones, megalithic monuments, Lulworth Cove, Badbury Rings
4	December 2009	Cotswolds	Bulwarks, Rodmartin long barrow, Stroudwater canal, Sapperton Canal Tunnel, Church of the Holy Rood, St Michael's Church, Duntisbourne Rouse, Crickley Hill
5	March 2010	Avebury, Wiltshire	Stone tools Recognition Day at Avebury Study Centre,
6	April 2010	Garreg Las, Wales	Rock art
7	May 2010	Cranborne Chase	Down Farm
8	September 2010	Gower Peninsula, Wales	Rotherslade Bay, Hunts Bay, Cotswold-Severn long barrow, Parc le Breos Cwm, Cat Hole cave, Minchin Hole
9	October 2010	Valcamonica, Italy	Seradina, San Siro, Bedolina, Paspardo, Roman Archaeological National Museum, amphitheatre, Naquane National Park
10	December 2010	Bristol	Defensive walls, Floating Harbour
11	September 2011	Wiltshire	Stonehenge
12	October 2011	Sardinia, Italy	Tamuli, Sant' Andrea Priu, Anghelu Ruju
13	November 2011	Bristol	Bristol Museum
14	December 2011	St Fagans, Wales	Welsh National History Museum, Neolithic long barrows of Tinkinswood and St Lythans
15	February 2012	Cotswolds	Neolithic long barrows
16	March/April 2012	St Albans and Verulamium	St Albans clock tower, Roman theatre, Verulamium Museum, Nunnery, St Albans Cathedral
17	September 2012	Marlborough Downs	The Devil's Den burial chamber, medieval settlement of Raddun, experimental earthwork on Overton Down
18	October 2012	Gibraltar	Gibraltar Museum, Mediterranean Steps, Great Siege Tunnels, St. Michael's Cave
19	December 2012	Somerset & Dorset	Cadbury Castle, Ham Hill Hillfort, Sherborne
20	March 2013	Bristol	Clifton, Burwalls and Stokeleigh camps
21	April 2013	Forest of Dean	Lydney Park, Hopewell Colliery
22	July 2013	Somerset	Mendips walk, Rowberrow Cavern, Dolebury Warren hill fort
23	October 2013	Brittany, France	Finistère, allée couverte burial chambers, dolmens, medieval churches
24	December 2013	Salisbury	Old Sarum, Salisbury Cathedral
25	March 2014	Devon	The long barrows of Dartmoor
26	October 2014	Friesland & Drenthe, The Netherlands	Hunebed Passage graves, medieval churches, farmhouses & fort
27	April 2015	Bristol	Historic Bristol docks walk
28	September 2015	La Rioja, Spain	Neolithic passage graves, Palaeolithic cave art, Romanesque architecture churches and historic bodega
29	June 2016	Pembrokeshire, Wales	Neolithic and Iron Age sites, St David's Cathedral
30	September 2016	Ireland	Medieval, Bronze Age and Neolithic monuments from County Sligo to Dublin
31	September 2017	Dordogne, France	Palaeolithic cave art, Neolithic and medieval sites
32	October 2018	Alentejo, Portugal	Neolithic monuments & Roman sites in Alentejo, Lisbon sites
33	October 2019	Normandy, France	Neolithic, medieval and Second World War sites

== Recent Proceedings ==
The current Proceedings of the Clifton Antiquarian Club are published every four years, giving members the opportunity to have their personal research published. There is an editorial board to ensure that the content reaches a high standard. Volume 8, Landscape Enquiries, was published in December 2007. The thirteen chapter book includes contributions from members of the Clifton Antiquarian Club, as well as non-member scholars from Britain, Australia, Italy, Norway, and the United States. Volume 9 of the Proceedings, Early Medieval Enquiries, was published in March 2010. The subject of the latter book is early medieval Britain and it features eighteen papers that relate to British history in the period AD 410 to 1066. The tenth volume of the Proceedings was published in December 2014 and exclusively contained members current archaeological work together with details of all the club's recent activities. Volume 11 followed in 2018 and continued the mix of club members' work together with the club's own field projects.

== Research projects ==
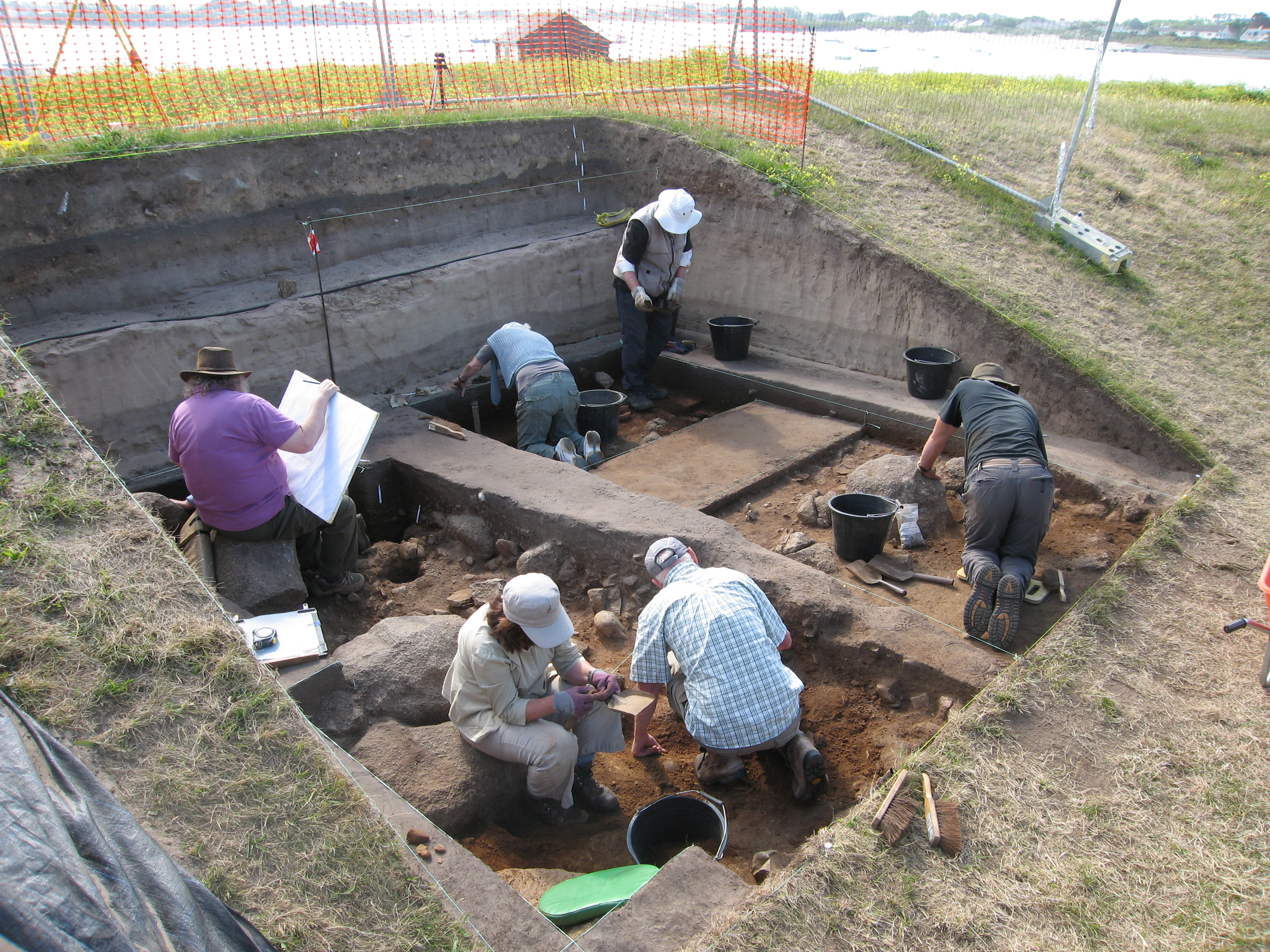
Rousse Headland excavation alongside Rousse loophole tower in Guernsey, Channel Islands

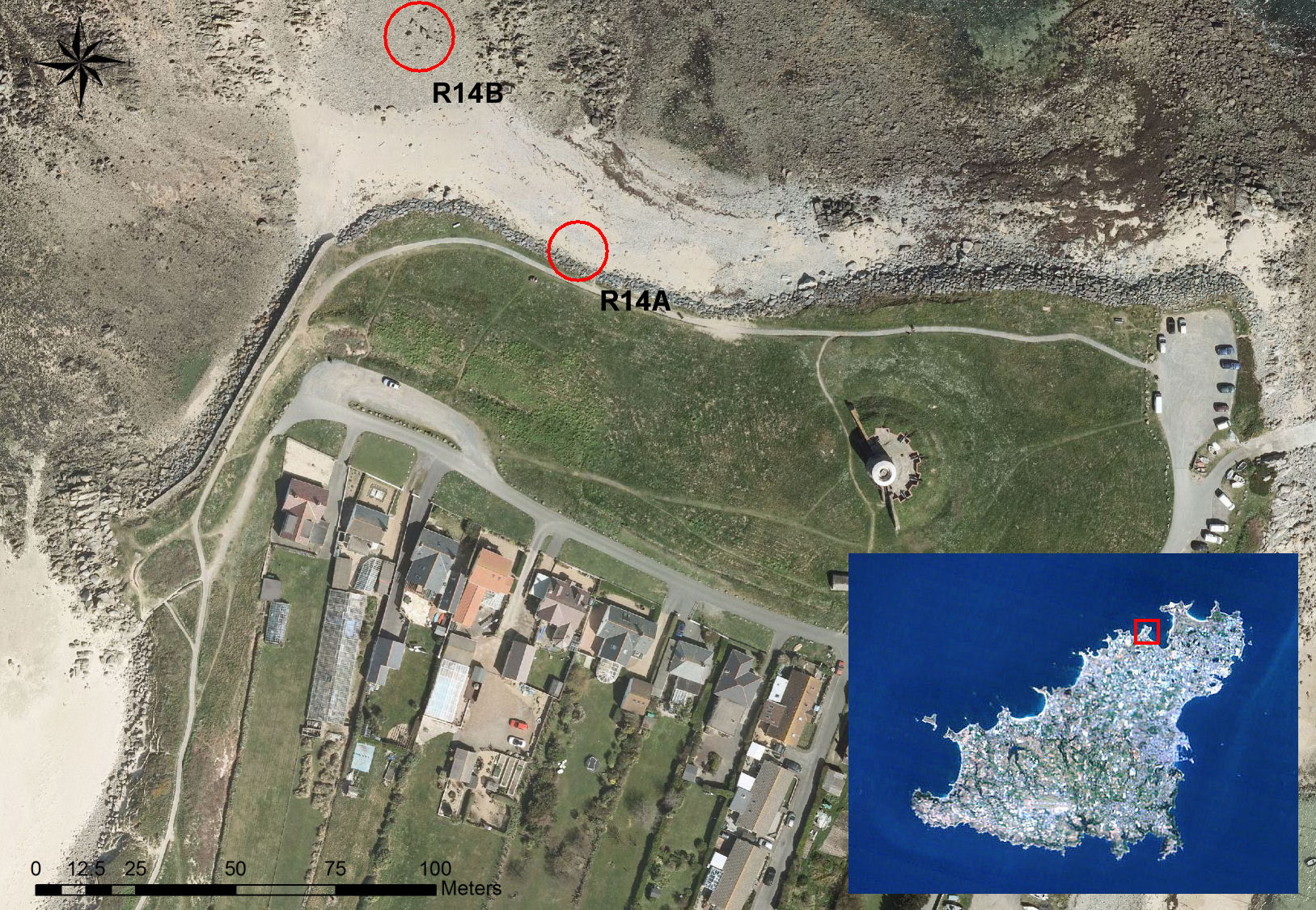
Double excavation on the beach at Rousse Headland, Guernsey

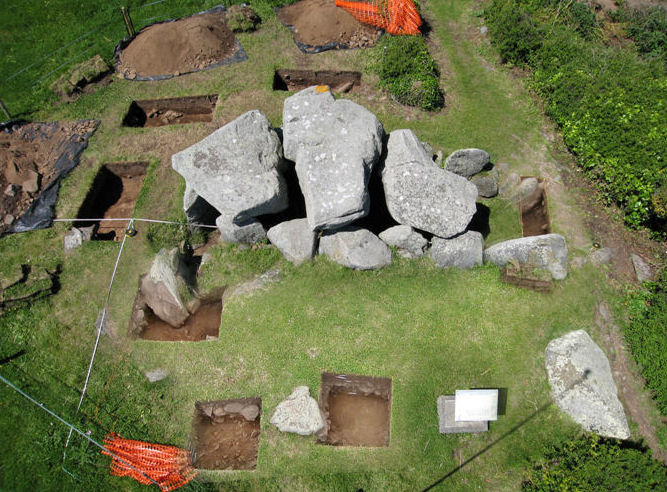
Le Trépied passage grave, Guernsey

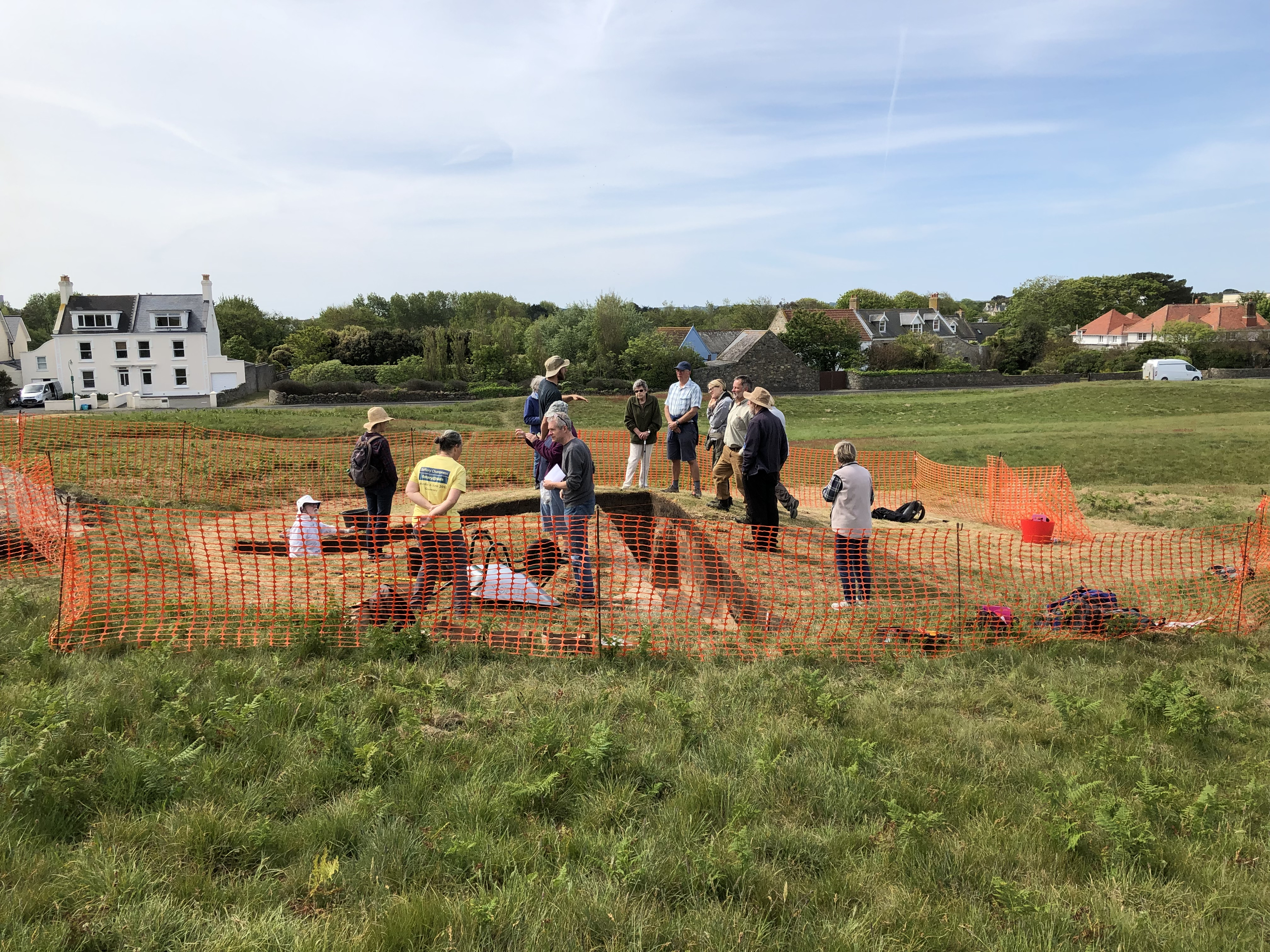
L'Ancresse Common excavation, Guernsey

Recent fieldwork has centred on the island of Guernsey, Channel Islands. In 2014 the club undertook excavations at two sites separated by just 50 metres on the west coast beach at Baie de Port Grat, St Sampson, where the remains of a new Neolithic chambered tomb had been discovered. Further up on the beach, the site of two Bronze Age cists were re-located and assessed.

In 2015 another Bronze Age site was re-evaluated, in the ditch which surrounded the Rousse loophole tower situated on Rousse Headland, one of the Guernsey loophole towers in north-west Guernsey. This had been briefly excavated in 1993 as part of tower restoration work. Late Neolithic/Early Bronze Age pottery was discovered together with flint tools and fragments of stone axes, in an area of considerable human activity.

In 2017 the club undertook an excavation at the Neolithic monument of Le Trépied, situated on the western edge of Guernsey. Charcoal obtained from primary contexts were sent for radiocarbon dating which yielded a date range of 4447–4267 cal BC, the earliest yet for a passage grave in the Channel Islands and represents the likely construction date.

In 2018–19 fieldwork began to establish the precise nature of a number of round earthworks on L'Ancresse Common, north Guernsey. This eventually revealed them to be field kitchens from the Napoleonic Wars era military camps. Originally, they had expected to uncover prehistoric archaeology but several key finds enabled the team to narrow down the date range of use to the first decade of the 19th century.

Currently scheduled for 2021, the next excavation will be at a prehistoric site on Le Jaonnet Common, north-west Guernsey.
