= Bagnell =

Bagnell may refer to:

== Places ==
- Bagnell, Missouri, US
  - Bagnell Dam
- Bagnell Ferry, Oregon, US

== People ==
- Edgar Wirt Bagnell (1890–1958), American aviator
- Francis J. "Reds" Bagnell (1928–1995), American football player
- Glen M. Bagnell (born 1936), Canadian politician
- John Bagnell Bury (1861–1927), Anglo-Irish historian and scholar
- Larry Bagnell (born 1949), Canadian politician

== See also ==
- Bagnall (disambiguation)
- Bignell (disambiguation)
