= Bignall =

Bignall may refer to:

- Bignall (surname)
- Bignall End, a small village in North Staffordshire
- Bignall Hill, Staffordshire
- Bignall FC, a football club based in Rotherham

== See also ==
- Bagnall (disambiguation)
- Bignell (disambiguation)
