= Richmond Island =

Island off the coast of Maine

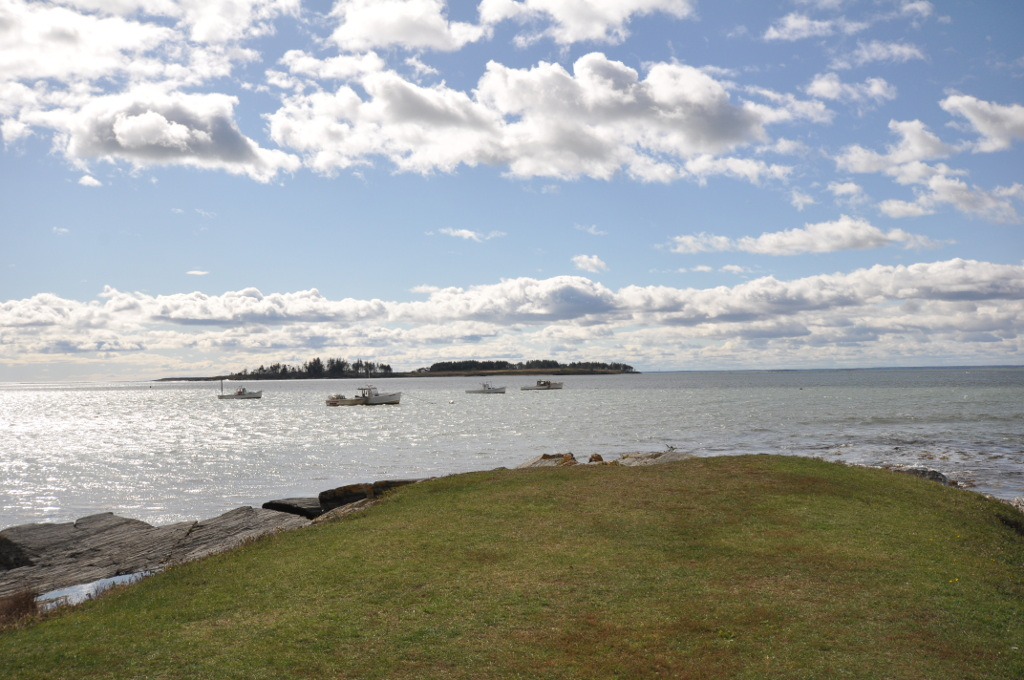
- Richmond Island, as seen from Kettle Cove State Park in Cape Elizabeth, Maine

- Location within Maine Location within the United States

Geography
- Location: Gulf of Maine
- Coordinates: 43°32′38″N 70°14′5″W
- Area: 226 acres (91 ha)

Administration
- United States of America
- State: Maine
- County: Cumberland County
- Town: Cape Elizabeth
- Richmond's Island Archeological Site
- U.S. National Register of Historic Places
- Nearest city: Cape Elizabeth, Maine
- Area: 195 acres (79 ha) (listed area)
- Built: 1628
- NRHP reference No.: 78000175
- Added to NRHP: November 2, 1978

Richmond Island, or Richmond's Island, is an island off the coast of Cape Elizabeth in Cumberland County, Maine, in the United States. The island is named for Ludovic Stewart, 2nd Duke of Lennox and 1st Duke of Richmond. Now privately owned and unoccupied, it is notable as the site of a permanent fishing post in the 17th century, the first settlement in Cape Elizabeth. It was listed on the National Register of Historic Places in 1978 for the significance of that post's archaeological remains.

== Geography ==
Richmond Island is part of Wabanakik, the ancestral land of the Wabanaki. It is located off the southern coast of what is now called Cape Elizabeth, near the northeastern end of Saco Bay in the Gulf of Maine. The island is 226 acres (91 ha) in size. The island has no permanent occupants, and the only structures on it are the keeper's quarters, a cabin, a potato storage 'cellar', and a boat dock located on its northwestern shore. The island is privately owned by the Sprague Corporation, through which permission to camp on the island can be arranged.

== History ==
Prior to European colonization, the island was inhabited by the indigenous Abenaki; they were displaced from the region by European settlement and forced to move to the area around modern-day Northern New England. The Abenaki spoke an Algonquian language, Eastern Abenaki. In 1614, the explorer John Smith charted the waters in the vicinity, taking note of the island and including it in his maps. In the summer of 1623, Christopher Levett visited the island, finding no other Europeans there. Master John Burgess of the merchantman Annes also visited the island in April 1627. The island's first known permanent settler was Walter Bagnall, who operated a fishing station from 1627 to 1631, when Bagnall was killed in a skirmish with the Abenaki. The next European settlement on the island was established the same year, when Maine merchant Robert Trelawney was granted a patent for land in the area and sent the settler John Winter to establish a permanent fishing station on the island. From 1633 to 1643, Winter, with a crew of about 40 men, operated the station, constructing a house and establishing farms on the island. The station was also fortified against potential attacks both from the Abenaki and the Acadian settlement at Fort Pentagoet in Penobscot Bay.

== See also ==
- National Register of Historic Places listings in Cumberland County, Maine
