= Bagenal =

Bagenal or Bagnal is a surname, and may refer to:

- Nicholas Bagenal (c. 1509–1591), English-born Marshal of the Irish Army
- Dudley Bagenal (1554–1587), soldier in Ireland, son of Nicholas
- Henry Bagenal (c. 1556–1598), Marshal of the Irish Army, son of Nicholas
- Mabel Bagenal (c. 1571–1595), Anglo-Irish noblewoman, daughter of Nicholas
- Dudley Bagenal (Jacobite) (1638–1712), Jacobite politician
- Lord Walter Bagenal (1670–1745), founder of Bagenalstown, son of the above
- Beauchamp Bagenal (1741–1802), Irish politician, son of the above
- Walter Bagenal (1762–1814), Irish politician
- Hope Bagenal (1888–1979), British architectural theorist
- Fran Bagenal (born 1954), professor at University of Colorado Boulder

== See also ==
- Bagnall (disambiguation)
