= Richard Bignell =

Richard Bignell may refer to:

- Richard Bignell, member of the Doctor Who Restoration Team
- Richard Bignell, British Rugby Union footballer, currently playing for Moseley Rugby Football Club
- Richard Bignell, former head master of Exhall Grange School in Coventry, United Kingdom

== See also ==
- Bignell (disambiguation)
