= Richard Bagnall-Oakeley =

British archer (1865–1947)

- Born: 12 November 1865; Monmouth, Wales
- Died: 5 July 1947 (aged 81); Gloucestershire, England
- Known for: Olympic archer

Richard Henry Bagnall-Oakeley a.k.a. Oakeley (12 November 1865 – 5 July 1947) was a Welsh archer who competed at the 1908 Summer Olympics in London. He was born in Penallt, Monmouthshire, Wales.

== Life ==
Bagnall-Oakeley was baptised on 23 November 1865 as the youngest child of the Reverend William and Mary Ellen Bagnall-Oakeley.

Bagnall-Oakeley entered the double York round event in 1908, taking 21st place with 374 points. He also participated in the Continental style event, but his result is unknown. He was a member of the Royal Toxophilite Society. He died on 5 July 1947 at a nursing home in Gloucestershire.

== Family ==
Bagnall-Oakeley was married, and had three children

- Leoline Richard Bagnall-Oakeley (1897–1972)
- Rachel Bagnall-Oakeley (1900–1978)
- John Rowland Bagnall-Oakeley (1904–1977)

== Sources ==
- Buchanan, Ian British Olympians. Guinness Publishing (1991) ISBN 0-85112-952-8
- Cook, Theodore Andrea (1908). The Fourth Olympiad, Being the Official Report. London: British Olympic Association.
- De Wael, Herman (2001). "Archery 1908". Herman's Full Olympians. Archived from the original on 29 September 2006.
