= Gibbons Bagnall =

English writer

Gibbons Bagnall (1719–1800) was an English poetical writer.

Bagnall was the son of Gibbons Bagnall of Windsor. He was admitted to Balliol College, Oxford, 12 July 1738, where he proceeded B.A. 30 April 1741. He afterwards went to King's College, Cambridge, where he took the degree of M.A. in 1760. Taking orders, he became vicar of Holm Lacy in Herefordshire, and head-master of the free school at Hereford. He was collated on 27 May 1760 to the prebend of Piona Parva in the church of Hereford, and on 1 Aug. 1767 to the prebend of Barsham in the same cathedral establishment. He also held for some time the rectory of Upton Bishop: and in 1783 he was presented to the vicarage of Sellack. He died on 31 December 1800, in his 82nd year.

== Works ==
- A Sermon on Exodus XV. 20, 1762, 8vo.
- Education: an Essay, in verse, London, 1765, 4to.
- A New Translation of Telemachus, in English verse, 2 vols., Hereford, 1790, 8vo; 2 vols., Dublin, 1792, 12mo.
