= Walter Bagnall (settler) =

- Died: 1631

Walter Bagnall (died 1631) was an early settler of the colony of Massachusetts Bay. In 1628, he became the first European immigrant to settle on Richmond Island, off Cape Elizabeth in today's Maine.

Known as "Great Walt," Bagnall was a trader, and gained fortune by cheating the Wabanaki Confederacy. He was killed in 1631 by Scitterygusset (or Squidrayset), the brother of female Wabanaki leader Warrabitta. Allegedly, his death was avenged by the hanging of pirate "Black Will", who was under the command of Dixie Bull.
