= Hunts Bay =

Bay in Wales

Coordinates: 51°33′41″N 4°04′29″W

Hunts Bay is located on the south coast of the Gower Peninsula, Wales, between Pwll du and Foxhole to the east of Three Cliffs Bay. It was once a sandy beach, but the sand depth on the beach is diminishing, leaving a rocky cove. The loss of sand has been attributed to sand dredging in the local coastal area.
