= Hugh Bignell =

English cricketer and Indian Army officer (1882–1907)

Personal information
- Full name: Hugh Glennie Bignell
- Born: 4 October 1882; Mozufferpore, Bengal Presidency, British India
- Died: 6 May 1907 (aged 24); Rawalpindi, Punjab, British India
- Batting: Right-handed
- Bowling: Right-arm fast
- Relatives: Guy Bignell (brother)

Domestic team information
- Years: Team
- 1901–1902: Hampshire
- 1901/02: Europeans

Career statistics
Competition	First-class
Matches	6
Runs scored	140
Batting average	15.55
100s/50s	–/–
Top score	49*
Balls bowled	54
Wickets	0
Bowling average	–
5 wickets in innings	–
10 wickets in match	–
Best bowling	–
Catches/stumpings	2/–
- Source: ESPNcricinfo, 24 December 2009

Hugh Glennie Bignell (4 October 1882 — 6 May 1907) was an English first-class cricketer and British Indian Army officer.

The son of R. Bignell, he was born in British India at Mozufferpore in October 1882. Bignell was educated in England at Haileybury, where he played for the college cricket team. From there, he proceeded to the Royal Military College, Sandhurst. Bignell made his debut in first-class cricket for Hampshire against Somerset at Portsmouth in the 1901 County Championship, with him making a further three appearances that season. Whilst visiting India in September 1901, he made a single appearance in first-class cricket for the Europeans cricket team against the Parsees cricket team (consisting of members of Bombay's Zoroastrian community) at Poona in the Bombay Presidency Match. He returned to England, where he played a final first-class match for Hampshire against Kent in the 1902 County Championship. In six first-class matches, he scored 140 runs at an average of 15.55, with a top-score of 49 not out.

Bignell graduated from Sandhurst as a second lieutenant in August 1902, and was added to the unattached list of the British Indian Army. In October of the same year, he was posted to the 36th Sikhs, with promotion to lieutenant following in January 1905. Bignell died at Rawalpindi on 6 May 1907, from typhoid fever. His brother, Guy, was also a first-class cricketer.
