= Bignall (surname) =

Bignall is a surname. Notable people with the surname include:

- Bob Bignall (1922–2013), Australian soccer player
- Herbert Bignall (1906–1989), British long-distance runner
- Kris Bignall (born 1979), Australian Paralympic boccia player
- Nicholas Bignall (born 1990), English footballer
- Simone Bignall, Australian philosopher
- Thomas Bignall (1842–1898), English cricketer
