= Bignell, Nebraska =

Unincorporated community in Nebraska, United States

- Unincorporated Community
- Location within Nebraska Location within the United States
- Coordinates: 41.1°N 100.6°W
- Country: United States
- State: Nebraska
- County: Lincoln

Bignell is an unincorporated community in Lincoln County, Nebraska, United States.

== History ==
A post office was established at Bignell in 1908, and remained in operation until it was discontinued in 1933. The community was named for E. C. Bignell, a railroad official.
