= Mary Ellen Bagnall-Oakeley =

English artist and antiquarian (1833–1904)

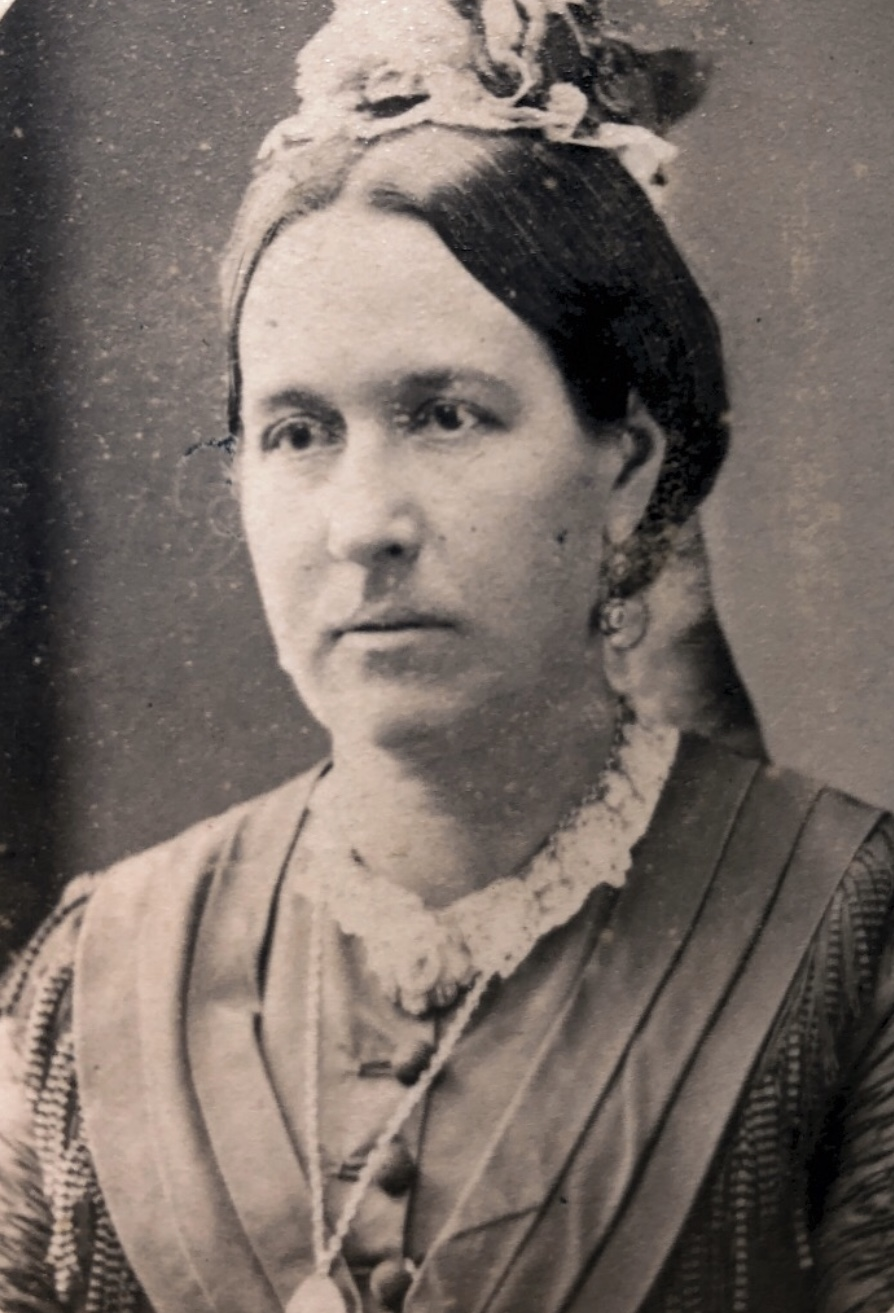
- Born: 1833; West Bromwich, Staffordshire, England
- Died: 26 May 1904 (aged 70–71); Monmouth, Monmouthshire, Wales
- Occupations: Antiquarian, author, painter, school governor
- Board member of: Haberdashers' Monmouth School for Girls
- Spouse: William Oakeley

Mary Ellen Bagnall-Oakeley (1833–1904) was an English antiquarian, author, and painter known for her work in Bristol and south-east Wales. She was a governor of the Haberdashers' Monmouth School for Girls.

== Background ==
Mary Ellen Bagnall was eldest daughter of John Bagnall (1794–1840). Her father, eldest son of another John Bagnall, had become the senior member of John Bagnall and Sons upon the death of his father in 1829. The senior John Bagnall had been established the firm, bringing five of his sons into partnership with him in 1828, the year before his death. The company had extensive collieries and ironworks. Mary Ellen's father John died on 4 February 1840.

Mary Ellen Bagnall married William Oakeley (1822–1912), son of Thomas and Elizabeth Oakeley, on 31 August 1853 in Monmouth. She was the mother of nine children, the youngest being the Olympic archer, Richard Henry.

== Clifton Antiquarian Club ==
Mary Ellen Bagnall-Oakeley was a member of or associated with a number of societies in England and Wales. She took an interest in antiquarianism and numismatics, and penned numerous articles and pamphlets on antiquarian topics for societies. These included the 1902 '"Monnow Bridge Tower: Description of the Tower and Its History, with Copy of Old Documents in Connection Therewith" (Volume 1 of Monmouthshire pamphlets).

On 8 January 1891, Reverend William Oakeley was elected to membership of the Clifton Antiquarian Club, based in Bristol. As a woman, Mary Ellen was excluded from membership in that society, but was still able to submit learned papers to the society and participate in the day excursions that the club sponsored. On 20 July 1889, the club undertook an excursion to Tintern Abbey and Monmouth. The Bagnall-Oakeleys served as guides for the Monmouth portion of the excursion, visiting St. Thomas Church, the gatehouse on the Monnow Bridge, the ruins of Monmouth Castle, the Church of St. Mary, and "Geoffrey's" Window.

Mary Ellen Bagnall-Oakeley's submissions to the Clifton Antiquarian Club include:

- "Notes on the Stitches Employed in the Embroidery of the Copes." (Read on 20 December 1887, appeared in Volume 1)
- "Notes on Round Towers." (Read on 12 October 1891, appeared in Volume 2)
- "Early Christian Settlements in Ireland." (Read on 20 November 1893, appeared in Volume 3)
- "A Week in the Aran Islands." (Read on 22 November 1894, appeared in Volume 3)
- "On a Great Hoard of Roman Coins." (Read on 28 January 1896, appeared in Volume 3)

== Bristol and Gloucestershire Archaeological Society ==
Bagnall-Oakeley was a member of the Bristol and Gloucestershire Archaeological Society, where she gave presentations on a variety of antiquarian subjects. The society was founded in 1876 and, like the Clifton Antiquarian Club, offered a programme of lectures and excursions. In 1889, she presented a paper entitled "Sanctuary knockers" (or "hagodays") which detailed the history of 12th to 14th century church door knockers, the use of which allowed anyone to claim sanctuary at any hour. She submitted sixteen papers over a period of twenty years:

- "On Roman Coins found in the Forest of Dean" (Volume 6, 1881–1882)
- "On Some Sculptured Effigies of Ecclesiastics in Gloucestershire" (Volume 9, 1884–1885)
- "Ancient Church Embroidery in Gloucestershire" (Volume 11, 1886–1887)
- "Ancient Church Embroidery in Gloucestershire (addendum)." (Volume 11, 1886–1887)
- "Sanctuary Knockers" (Volume 14, 1889–1890)
- "On the Monumental Effigies of the Family of Berkeley" (Volume 15, 1890–1891)
- "Ancient Sculptures in the South Porch of Malmesbury Abbey Church" (Volume 16, 1891–1892)
- "Ladies' Costume in the Middle Ages as represented on Monumental Effigies and Brasses" (Volume 16, 1891–1892)
- "On Some Pre-Roman Sculptured Slabs At Daglingworth Church" (Volume 17, 1892–1893)
- "The Dress of Civilians in the Middle Ages, from Monumental Effigies" (Volume 18, 1893–1894)
- "Notes on a great Hoard of Roman Coins found at Bishop's Wood" (Volume 19, 1894–1895)
- "Grosmont Castle, Skenfrith Castle and Church, Pembridge Castle" (Volume 20, 1895–1897)
- "Monumental Effigies in Bristol and Gloucestershire" (Volume 25, 1902)
- "Rural Deanery of South Forest" (Volume 25, 1902)
- "Rural Deanery of Bitton" (Volume 25, 1902)
- "Rural Deanery of Cheltenham" (Volume 25, 1902)

== Illustrations for research papers ==
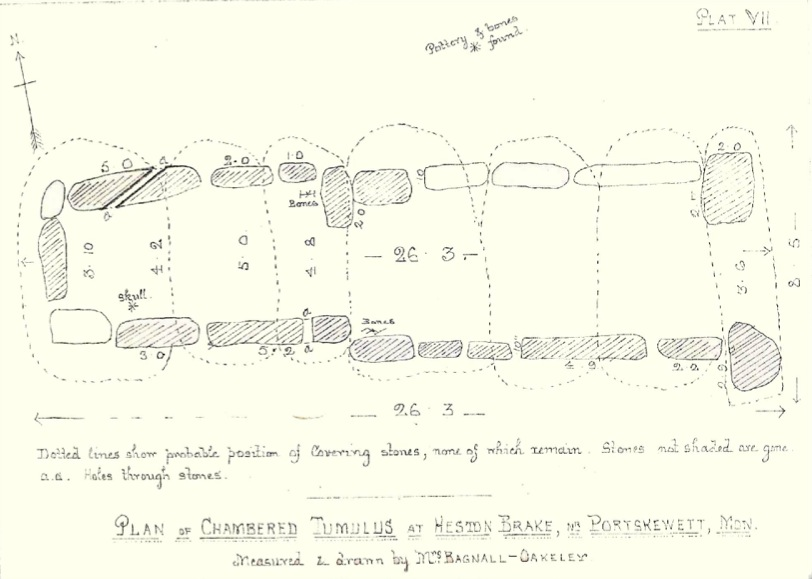
Plan of chambered tumulus at Heston Brake in Portskewett, Monmouthshire, 1888

Bagnall-Oakeley was also an accomplished artist, producing watercolours, and drawings accompanying some of her and her husband's research papers. As mentioned above, women were allowed to join the excursions of the Clifton Antiquarian Club; Bagnall-Oakeley actively participated in their investigations rather than simply accompanying the party. An example of this is the excursion sponsored jointly by the Clifton Antiquarian Club and the Monmouthshire and Caerleon Antiquarian Association on 22 August 1888, described in the postscript to the 1888 paper authored by the Reverend William Oakeley, "The Chambered Tumulus at Heston Brake, Monmouthshire," found in Volume 2 of the Proceedings of the Clifton Antiquarian Club. The tumulus at the site Heston Brake in Portskewett was opened and examined under the direction of the members of the two associations. There was evidence that the tumulus had been previously disturbed; the few relics which remained, fragments of pottery and human bones and teeth, are now in the Caerleon Museum, the National Roman Legion Museum. Bagnall-Oakeley made measurements of all the components of the tumulus. Her illustration (pictured), "Plan of Chambered Tumulus at Heston Brake, nr Portskewett, Mon." accompanies her husband's paper. Illustrations also accompanied some of her own research papers. An example is "Notes on Round Towers" which was read on 12 October 1891 and appeared in Volume 2 of the Proceedings of the Clifton Antiquarian Club, examining the topic of round towers in Ireland, Scotland, Germany, France, and Italy.

== Haberdashers' Monmouth School for Girls ==
The Haberdashers' Monmouth School for Girls was founded in 1892 by The Worshipful Company of Haberdashers. the charity having been founded by the haberdasher William Jones. Jones made The Worshipful Company of Haberdashers the trustee of his foundation, which funded a number of schools and alms houses, including the Monmouth School and the Monmouth Alms Houses. When the Monmouth School for Girls was established, Mary Ellen Bagnall-Oakeley was appointed as a governor, along with three other women, and was responsible for managing the school. One of the school's Houses is named Bagnall-Oakeley in her honour. Students in her House may receive a Certificate of Bagnall Endeavours for a special accomplishment or an Order of Bagnall Excellence for an outstanding accomplishment.

== Watercolour paintings ==
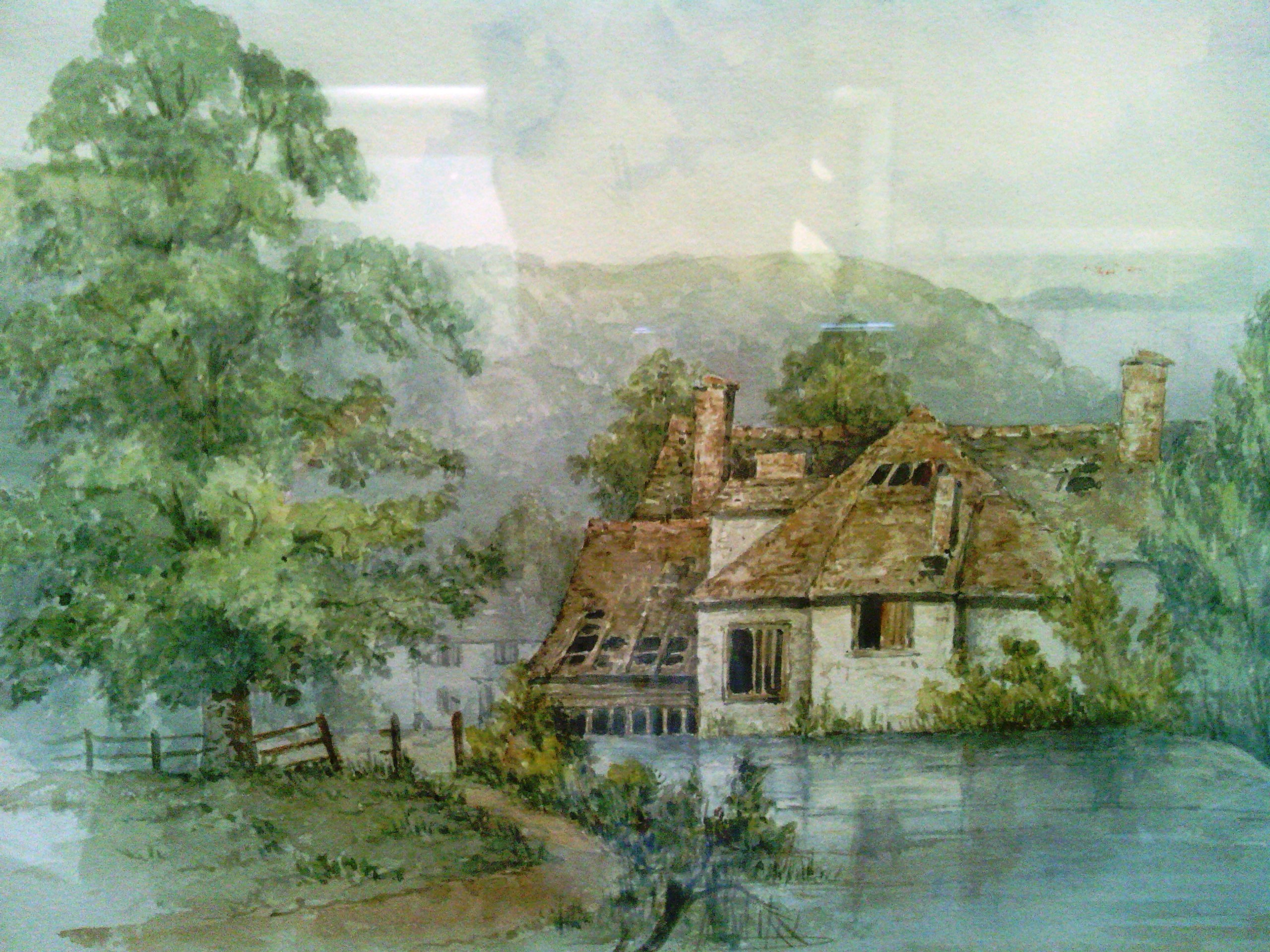
Forge by Mary Ellen Bagnall-Oakeley

A book of Bagnall-Oakeley's watercolours, entitled Nooks and corners of old Monmouthshire: A catalogue of watercolour paintings by Mary Ellen Bagnall-Oakeley (1833–1904), is held by the Monmouth Museum. Her collection of paintings is also at the Monmouth Museum at Market Hall on Priory Street. They include the watercolour, "Forge" (pictured).

== Later family life ==
The Reverend William Oakeley's responsibilities included the spiritual welfare of those in the William Jones Newland Alms Houses in Newland, Gloucestershire. The bequest from William Jones to the town of Newland had also created a lectureship, which was held by Reverend Oakeley. Mary Ellen Bagnall-Oakeley was a staunch supporter of women's suffrage. Rev. William Oakeley periodically used his wife's conjoined surname Bagnall-Oakeley as his own. Mary Ellen Bagnall-Oakeley died on 26 May 1904 in Monmouth. Mary Ellen and her husband were both interred in Monmouth Cemetery.
