= Edgar Wirt Bagnell =

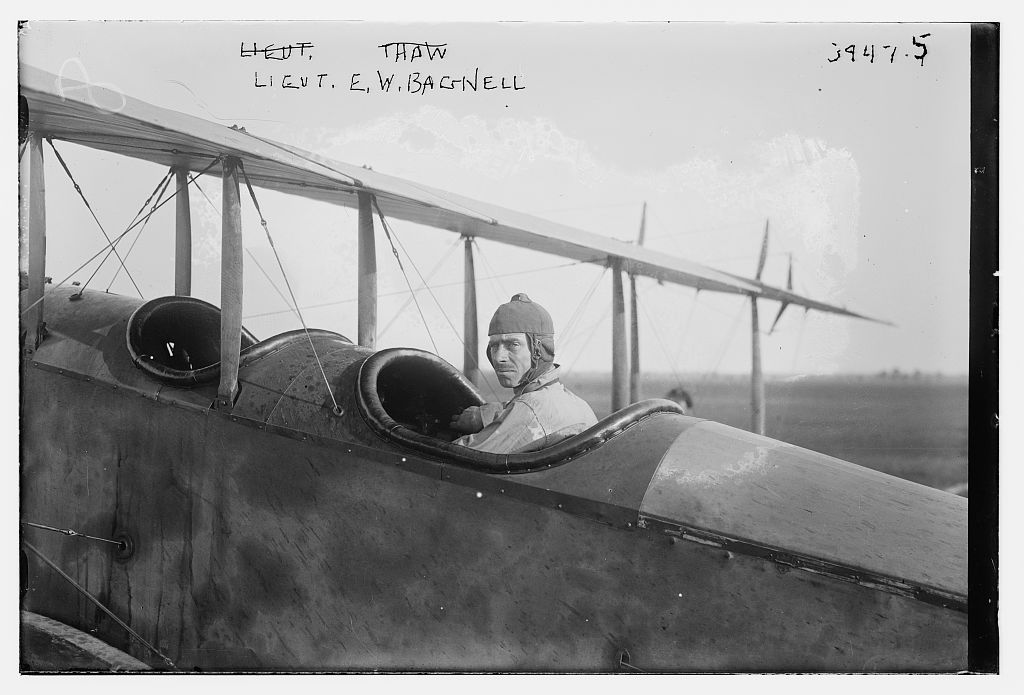
Bagnell in 1916

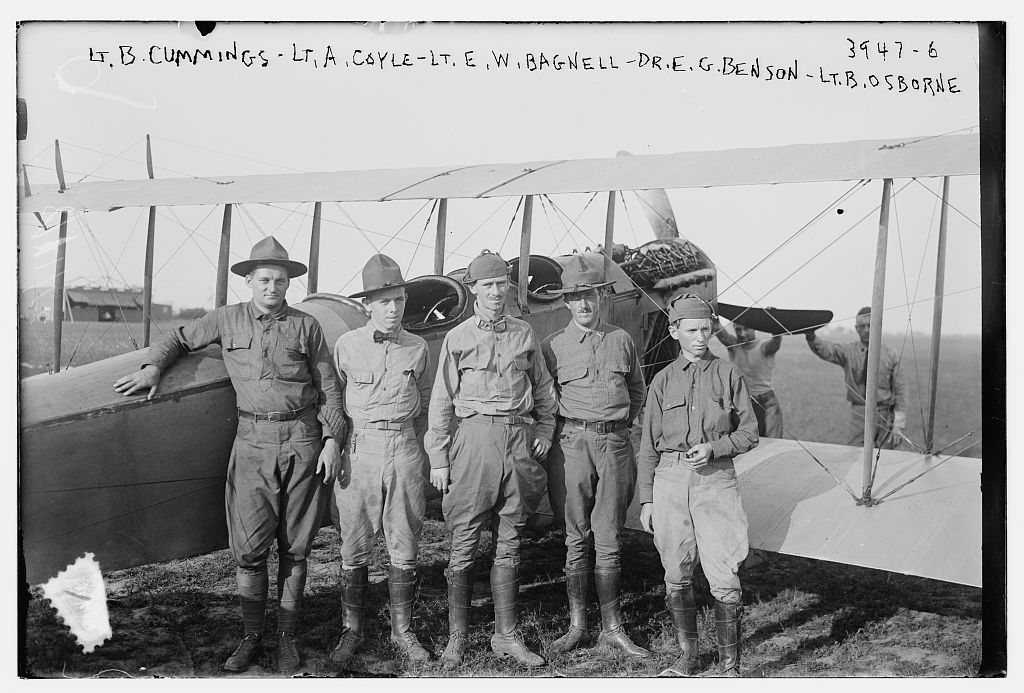
Lt. Bernard Cummings, Lt. Arthur Joseph Coyle (1987-1989), Lt. Edgar Wirt Bagnell (1890-1958), Dr. Edward George Benson, and Lt. Bee Rife Osborne, Sr. (1887-1948) at the Curtiss Flying School in Newport News, Virginia in 1916

Edgar Wirt Bagnell (November 20, 1890 – August 27, 1958) was a pioneer aviator who was a member of the Early Birds of Aviation.

== Biography ==
He was born near McCool Junction, Nebraska, on November 20, 1890.

He learned to fly at Newport News, Virginia, in 1915. He was in charge of the 191st Combat Reconnaissance Squadron but by the time his training ended World War I was over. After the war, he worked for Glenn Curtiss as a test pilot in Houston, Texas. He later worked in the trucking industry, in the racing car business, in advertising and outdoor sign painting. He later piloted for a Mexican airline.

While in Los Angeles, California, in 1926 he was a student at the Chouinard Art School.

In later life, he had a job as a skilled machinist in Glendale, California. He died at a nursing home in Oakland, California, on August 27, 1958.
