= Guy Bignell =

English cricketer and Indian Army officer (1886–1965)

Personal information
- Full name: Guy Newcombe Bignell
- Born: 3 December 1886; Mozufferpore, Bengal Presidency, British India
- Died: 10 June 1965 (aged 78); Lausanne, Vaud, Switzerland
- Batting: Right-handed
- Bowling: Right-arm medium
- Relatives: Hugh Bignell (brother)

Domestic team information
- Years: Team
- 1904–1925: Hampshire
- 1923/24: Europeans

Career statistics
Competition	First-class
Matches	58
Runs scored	1,670
Batting average	20.61
100s/50s	1/5
Top score	109
Balls bowled	1,452
Wickets	17
Bowling average	44.64
5 wickets in innings	–
10 wickets in match	–
Best bowling	3/67
Catches/stumpings	27/–
- Source: ESPNcricinfo, 7 February 2010

Guy Newcombe Bignell MC (3 December 1886 — 10 June 1965) was an English first-class cricketer and British Indian Army officer. As an amateur cricketer, he played 58 first-class cricket matches, predomininantly for Hampshire. In the British Indian Army, he served for thirty years, during the course of which he saw action during the First World War and was decorated with the Military Cross.

== Cricket and military career ==
The fifth son of R. Bignell, he was born in British India at Mozufferpore in October 1886. Bignell was educated in England at Haileybury, where he played for the college cricket team. In the summer following his final year at Haileybury, Bignell made two appearances in first-class cricket for Hampshire in the 1904 County Championship against Warwickshire and Somerset during the Bournemouth Cricket Week. From Haileybury, he proceeded to the Royal Military College (RMC) in December 1904. The following summer, he made five appearances for Hampshire in the County Championship, scoring what would be his only first-class century against Kent at Portsmouth. In 1905, he also played for the Gentlemen of the South, captained by W. G. Grace, against the Players of the South. Bignell graduated from the RMC in January 1906, as a second lieutenant onto the unattached list of the British Indian Army. He became attached to the British Indian Army with the 29th Punjabis in March 1907, with promotion to lieutenant following in April 1908. He returned to England in 1908, where he made eleven first-class appearances for Hampshire. He also played for a Hambledon XII in 1908, in a commemorative first-class match against an England XI at Broadhalfpenny Down. His next appearances in first-class cricket for Hampshire followed in 1912, with him making 21 appearances, in which he scored 428 runs at an average of 17.12.

Bignell served during the First World War with his regiment in East Africa from 1 September 1914 to 31 October 1916, during the course of which he was promoted to captain in January 1915. He was mentioned in dispatches during the war, and was awarded the Military Cross in February 1917 for conspicuous gallantry whilst carrying messages under heavy enemy fire. He spent the latter part of the war serving in the Sinai and Palestine campaign from 5 April to 31 October 1918, shortly before the war ended.

Following the war, he returned to play first-class cricket for Hampshire, making eleven appearances in the 1919 County Championship; he played during this season under the pseudonym "G. Newcombe". Returning to Palestine, he was appointed brigade major of the 30th Infantry Brigade from 25 June 1920 to 29 April 1921 and the 29th Infantry Brigade from 6 May 1921 to 4 September 1922. He was promoted major in January 1921. He continued to serve with the 29th Punjabis until 30 April 1922, and by April 1923 he was serving with the 3rd Battalion, 2nd Punjab Regiment. His next appearance in first-class cricket came whilst serving in India, with Bignell making a single appearance for the Europeans cricket team against the Hindus at Lahore in the 1923–24 Lahore Tournament.

He returned to play four matches for Hampshire in the 1925 County Championship, bringing his total number of first-class appearances for the county to 55. In these, he scored 1,582 runs at an average of 20.54; alongside his lone century, he also made eight half centuries. With his right-arm medium pace bowling, he took 17 wickets at a bowling average of 42.47, with best figures of 3 for 67. Outside of the first-class game, he was a notable club cricketer for the Hampshire Hogs, Free Foresters, and the Marylebone Cricket Club. Bignell continued to serve with the British Indian Army, being appointed second-in-command of the 10th Battalion, 15th Punjab Regiment in October 1930. In December 1931, Bignell was promoted to lieutenant colonel and commandant of the 10th Battalion, 15th Punjab Regiment. He held this post until he retired from active service in December 1935.

During the Second World War, he was first involved with the Civil Defence Corps from 1940 to 1942 and then was employed with the Ministry of Fuel and Power in 1942.

Bignell died at the age of 76 at Lausanne in Switzerland on 10 June 1965. His brother, Hugh, was also a first-class cricketer.
