= Hamer Bagnall =

English cricketer

Hamer Fraser Bagnall was an English cricketer who played for Northamptonshire between 1921 and 1928. He was born in Farnham, Surrey on 18 February 1904 and died in Marylebone, London on 2 September 1974.

Playing also for Cambridge University and the Marylebone Cricket Club, Bagnall appeared in 85 first-class matches as a righthanded batsman who bowled leg spin. He scored 2,956 runs with a highest score of 128 not out, one of three centuries, and took no wickets.

He was educated at Harrow School and Cambridge University.
