= Cofiwch Dryweryn =

Graffitied wall in Ceredigion, Wales

Coordinates: 52°19′03″N 4°07′58″W

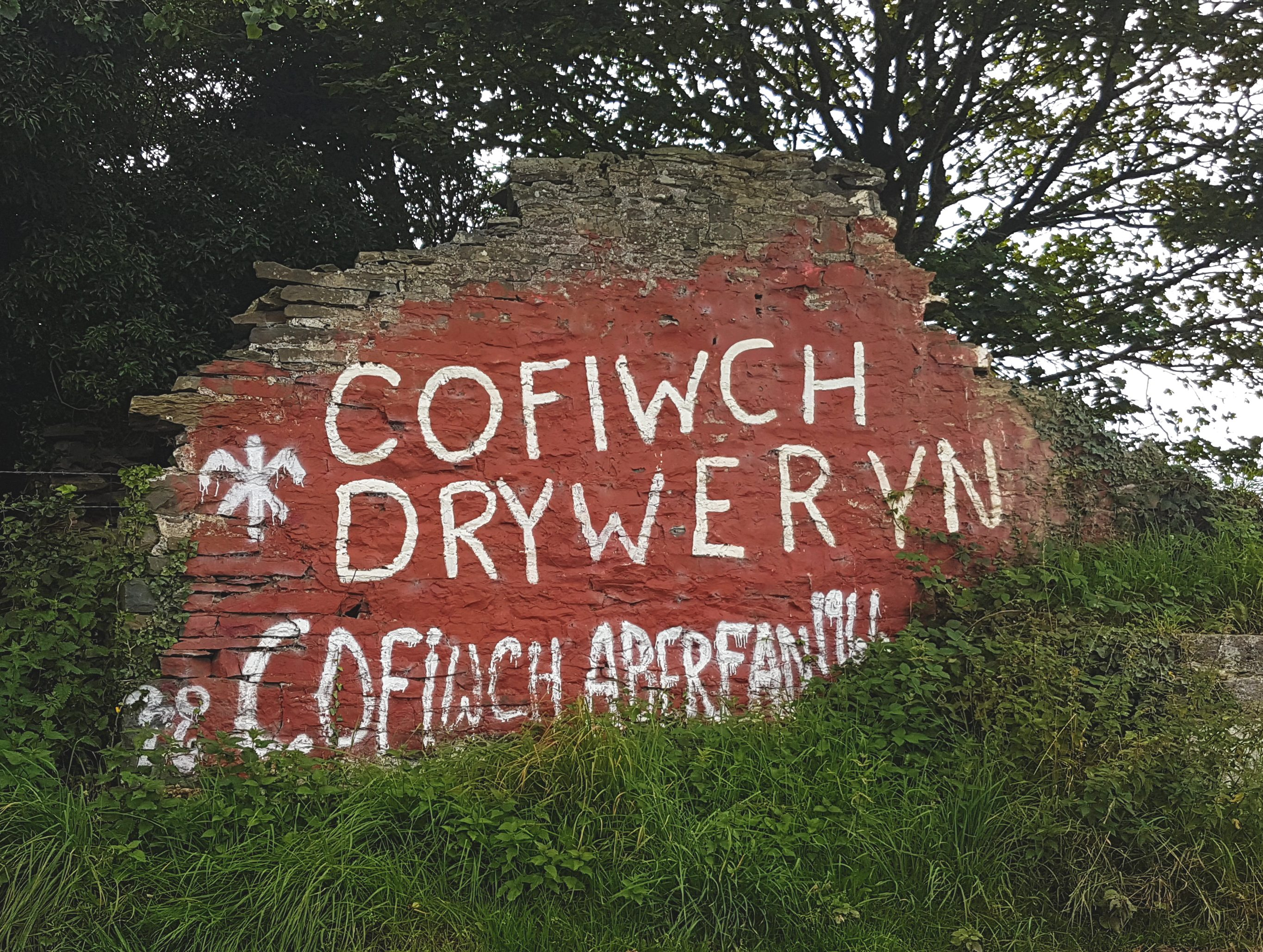
The wall in August 2017 with the Cofiwch Aberfan addition

Cofiwch Dryweryn (Welsh for 'Remember Tryweryn') is a graffitied stone wall near Llanrhystud, Ceredigion, Wales. Author and journalist Meic Stephens originally painted the words onto the wall of a ruined cottage in the early 1960s after Liverpool City Council decided to start the Tryweryn flooding, including the community of Capel Celyn, to create the Llyn Celyn reservoir. Due to its prominent location, stark message, and history of repeated vandalism, the wall has become an unofficial landmark of mid Wales. The phrase "Cofiwch Dryweryn" has itself become a prominent political slogan for Welsh nationalism, appearing on T-shirts and banners, and as replica murals.

== History ==
=== Background ===
In late 1957, with parliamentary approval, Liverpool City Council pursued the flooding of the Tryweryn Valley without the consent of Welsh authorities and against the wishes of most Welsh Members of Parliament. The council also failed to respond to formal planning inquiries presented by residents to explain their concerns about the proposal. Despite protests in Liverpool, London, and Wales, the valley was flooded in 1965, and several centuries-old communities such as Capel Celyn were lost.

=== Creation ===
In 1962 and 1963, Meic Stephens, a Welsh author and scholar, had painted numerous slogans across the South Wales Valleys. In response to the upcoming flooding of the Tryweryn Valley, Stephens decided to paint "Cofiwch Tryweryn" (sic), Welsh for "Remember Tryweryn", onto a rock. He drove around Wales with his friend Rodric Evans to find a suitable location, after which he spent fifteen to twenty minutes painting the message. The wall Stephens used is part of a ruined cottage named Troed-y-Rhiw. Because the original Cofiwch Tryweryn is grammatically incorrect, subsequent restorations of the wall have repainted the message correctly as Cofiwch Dryweryn, using the soft mutation.

=== Cultural impact ===
The flooding of Tryweryn itself was a pivotal moment in twentieth century Welsh nationalism, with militant groups and Plaid Cymru, the Welsh nationalist party, gaining increased support in the following years. As such the phrase Cofiwch Dryweryn has become a prominent maxim of Welsh nationalism, easily recognisable to people on both sides of the debate.

In a 2006 interview, Stephens stated that he "didn't choose the spot for any particular reason" and that he did not expect it to turn out any more iconic than his other slogans. The impact and notoriety of the message has been highlighted by the numerous occasions the wall has been the subject of vandalism and restorations, and the continuing debate regarding its protection as a Welsh cultural landmark.

=== Vandalism and protection ===
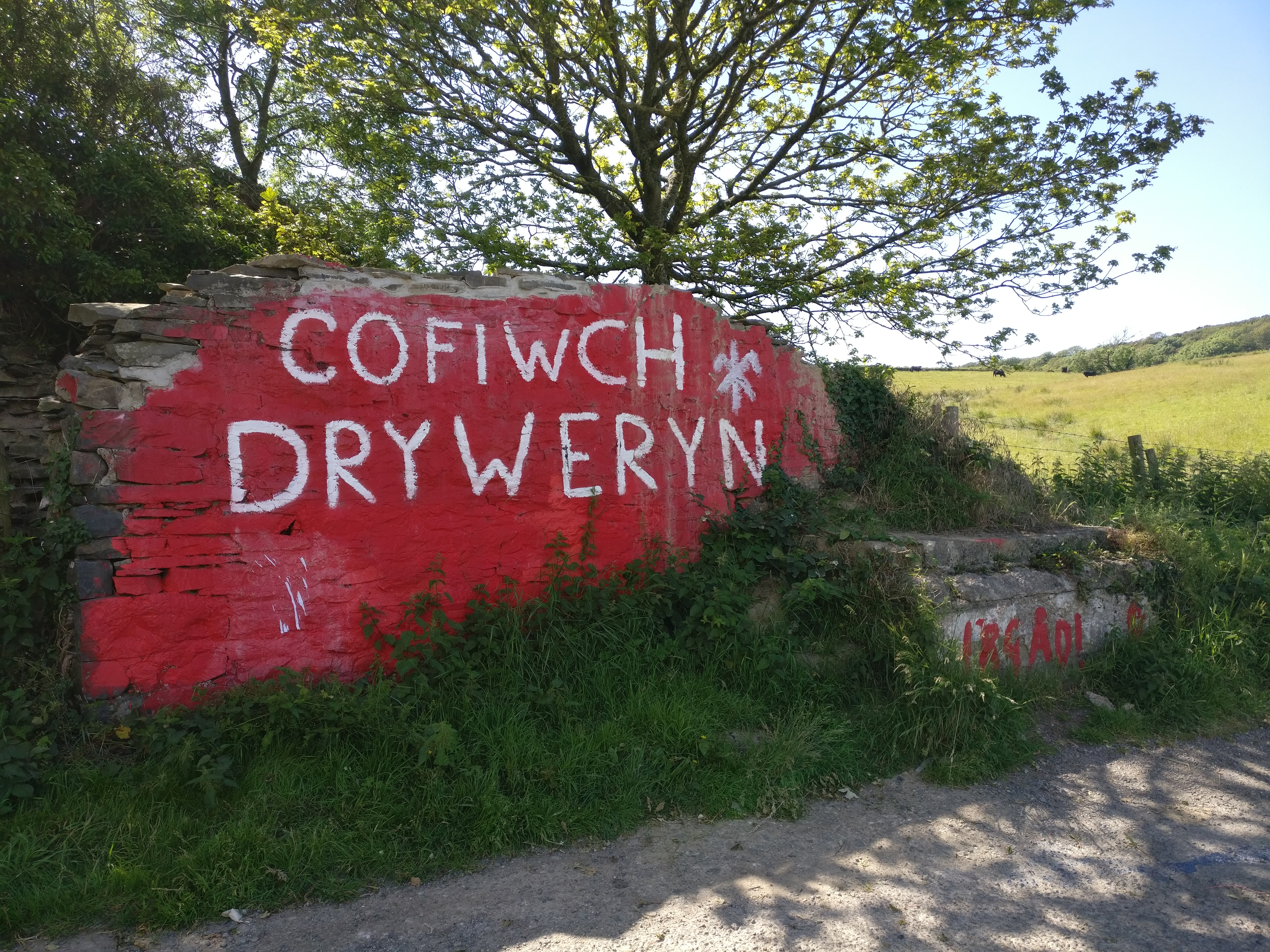
Shows the Tryweryn memorial wall just outside Llanrhystud with the i'r Gâd addition bottom right – after the repair in mid-2019.

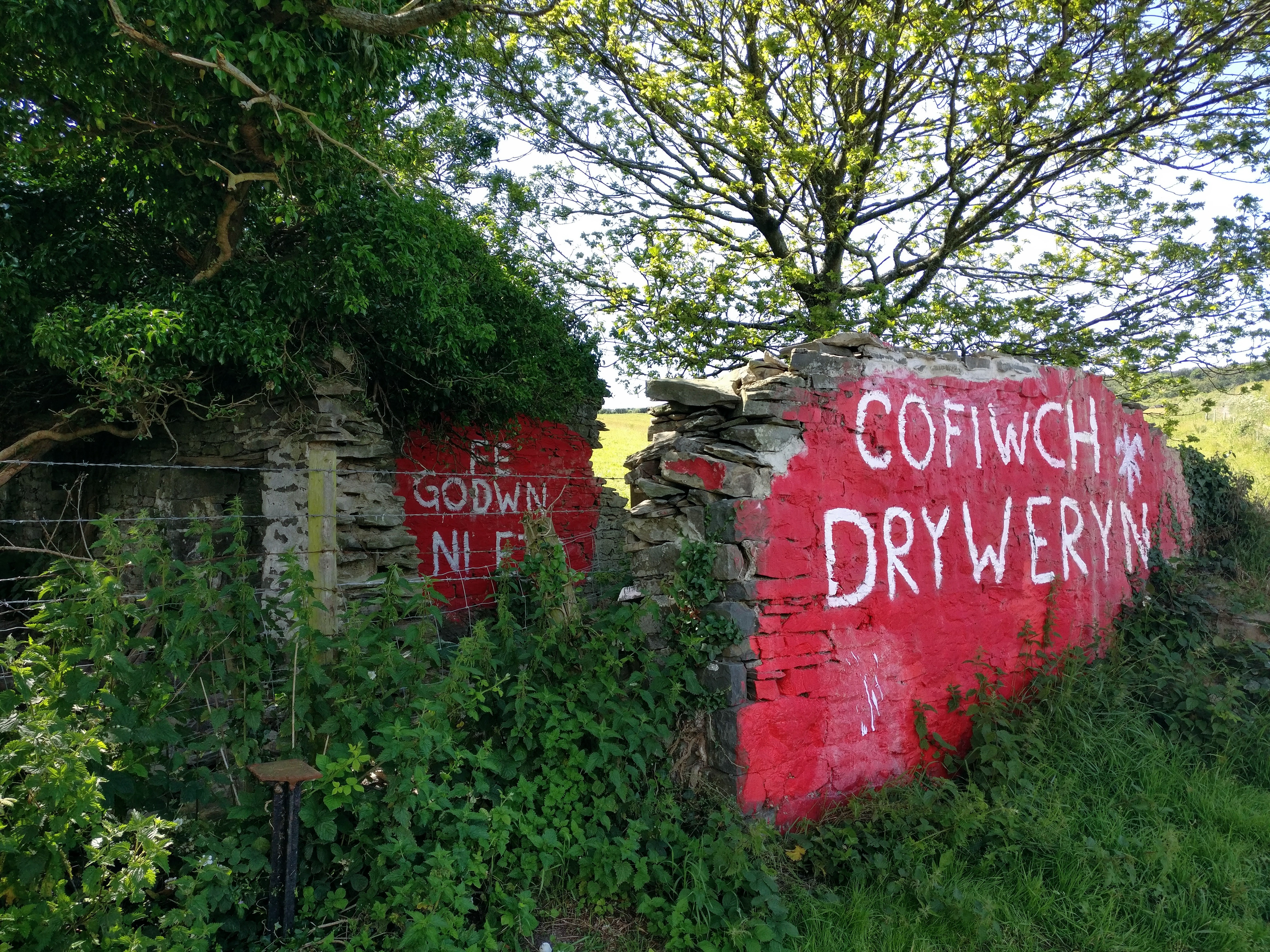
Shows the Tryweryn memorial wall and rear parts just outside Llanrhystud – after the repair in mid-2019.

The message has been both vandalised and restored on numerous occasions. In 1991, two schoolboys, Rhys ap Hywel and Daniel Simkins, painted the wall white and repainted the original letters in black. In doing so they misspelled Tryweryn as Trywerin. Ap Hywel later stated in interviews that his Welsh teacher at Ysgol Gyfun Gymunedol Penweddig knew he was responsible as he initialled the painting, but she only admonished him for the spelling error. Ap Hywel would consequently repaint the wall once more, correcting his spelling error and adding "Sorry Miss!"

In 2003, Cwmni Ieuenctid Ceredigion, the Ceredigion youth theatre company, repainted the phrase onto the wall as part of a show commemorating the events of Tryweryn directed by Anna ap Robert at Theatr Felinfach. By 2007, a section of the wall had fallen and the writing had been replaced with stencilled white letters on a red background. In May 2008, the message was altered to Angofiwch Dryweryn (English: "Forget Tryweryn"; correct spelling Anghofiwch). The monument was again defaced in April 2010, prompting a spokesperson for the Welsh Government to express their disappointment with the defacement after recent attempts to preserve the wall. Due to the wall's history of vandalism and its state of decay, many people wanted the wall to be designated as a national monument as a means of protection. Despite the launch of a fundraising campaign to achieve this goal, the wall did not receive any such designation, and it was further vandalised in 2013 and 2014.

In 2017, the words Cofiwch Aberfan 1966 ("Remember Aberfan 1966") were added underneath the original message, referring to the Aberfan disaster. After the wall was restored in 2018, it was defaced again in February 2019, though it was restored again the next day following a social media campaign. The incident saw renewed calls for its protection, with parallels drawn with Banksy's recent anti-air pollution work Season's Greetings in Port Talbot being protected from vandalism. Most notably, Bethan Sayed, Plaid Cymru's spokesperson for Heritage, Welsh Language and Sport, raised the issue with the Welsh government.

On 11 April 2019, i'r Gâd! ("to battle" or "to arms!") was added at the base of the mural, with the top section of the wall containing the word Cofiwch (remember) being demolished the next day. The wall was rebuilt and repainted on 13 April by a group of eight volunteers. In the subsequent days, a second wall next to the original was painted with Fe Godwn Ni Eto (lit. 'we shall rise again'), the slogan of the paramilitary Free Wales Army (FWA). Many iterations of the mural have also featured the organisation's "White Eagle of Snowdonia" symbol, often referred to as Yr Eryr Wen (lit. 'the white eagle'). Following this, the pro-independence campaign organisation YesCymru reported that over fifty new Cofiwch Dryweryn murals had been painted throughout Wales. In London, the message was displayed on a banner at that month's London Marathon, in addition to signs with the message being displayed at Downing Street and Whitehall. By the end of April, it was estimated that over a hundred murals with the message had been painted globally. Dyfed–Powys Police responded to vandalism by placing a CCTV camera at the site, stating that they were treating the demolishing of part of the wall as a hate crime. The trig point on Fan Gyhirych in the Brecon Beacons also bears the slogan.

On 30 June 2020, it was reported that the memorial had once again been vandalised, this time with a Nazi swastika and a white power symbol being painted over the text. The Senedd member for Ceredigion, Elin Jones, reported the next day that the mural had been restored.

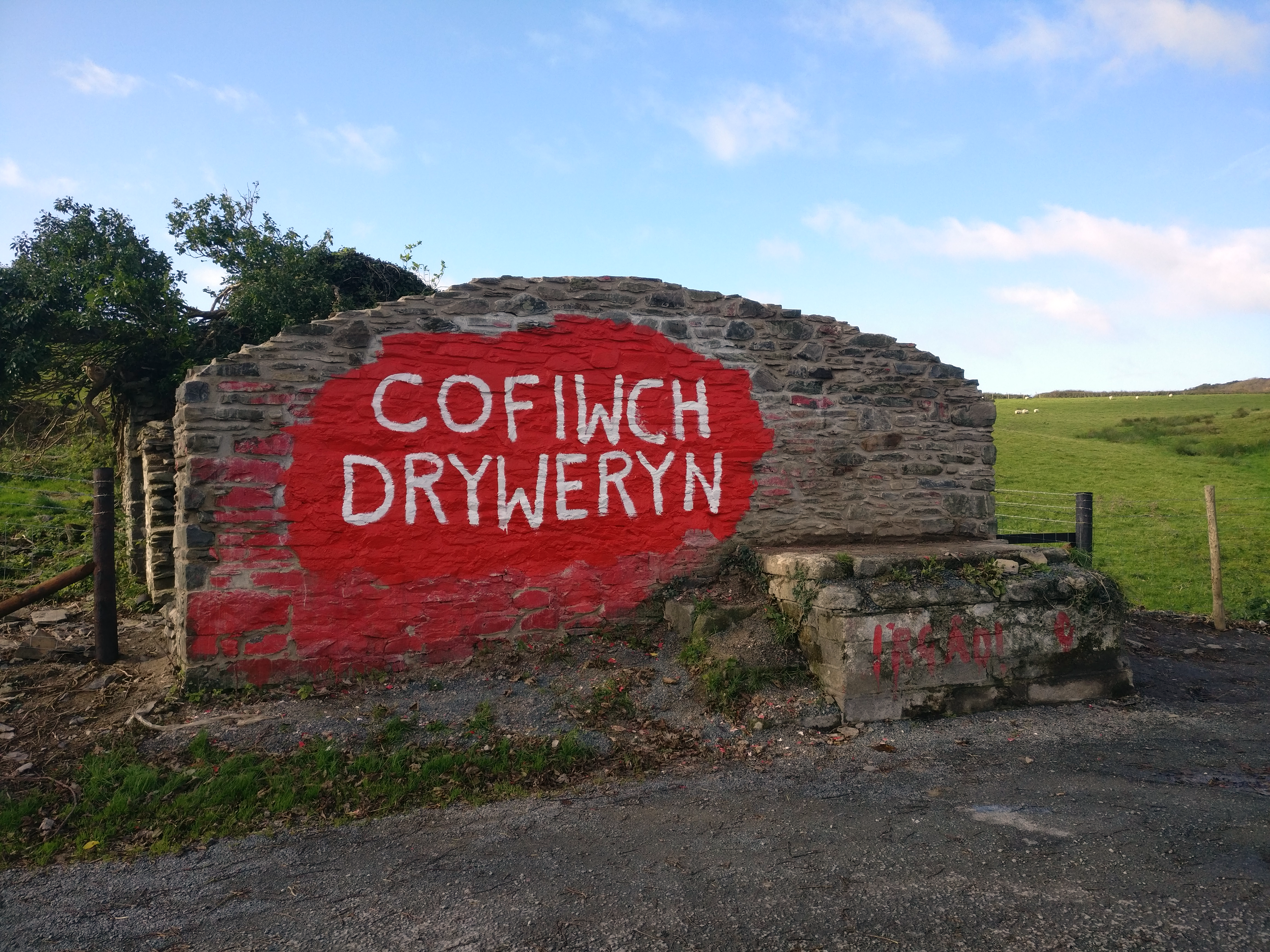
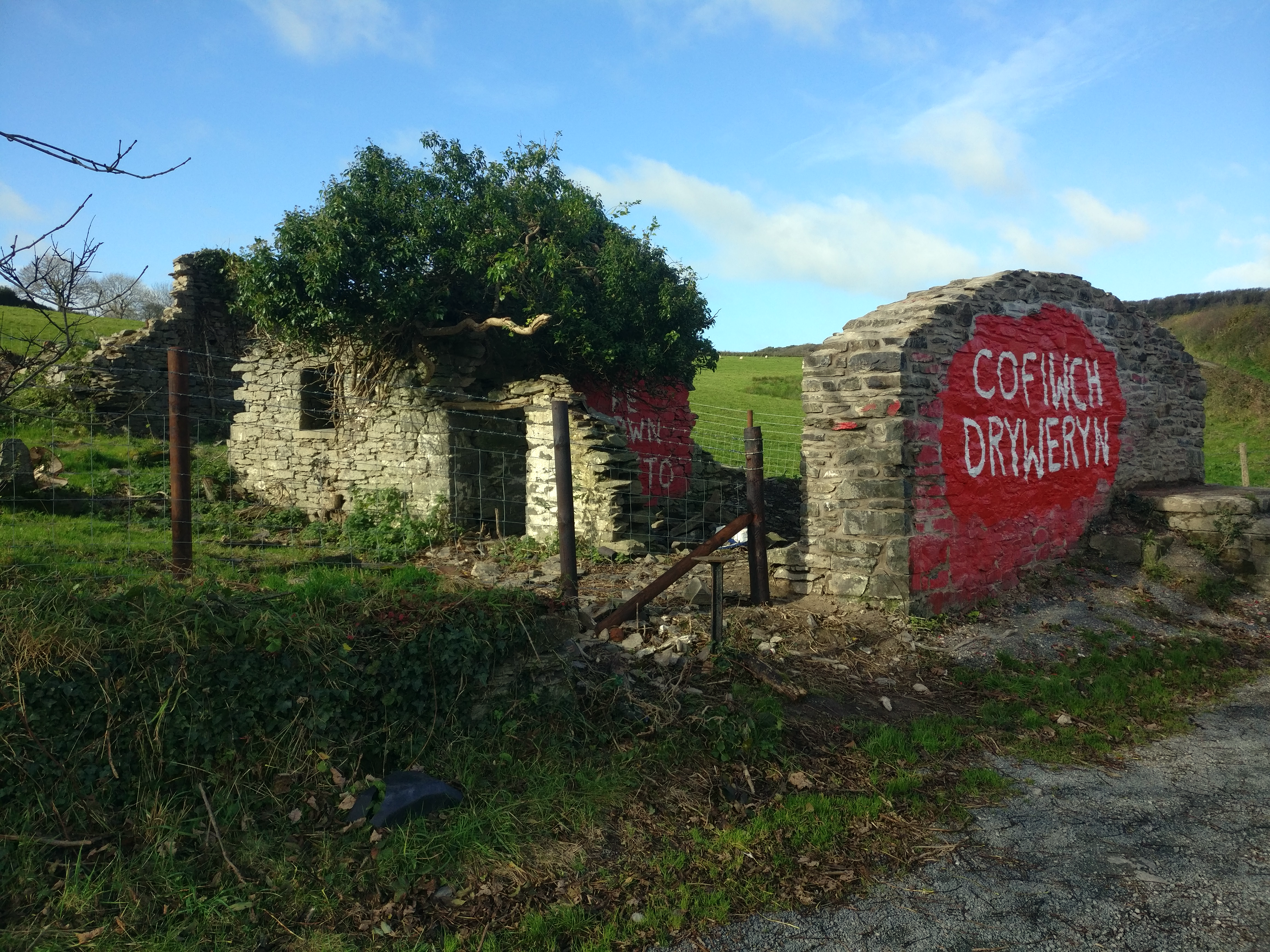
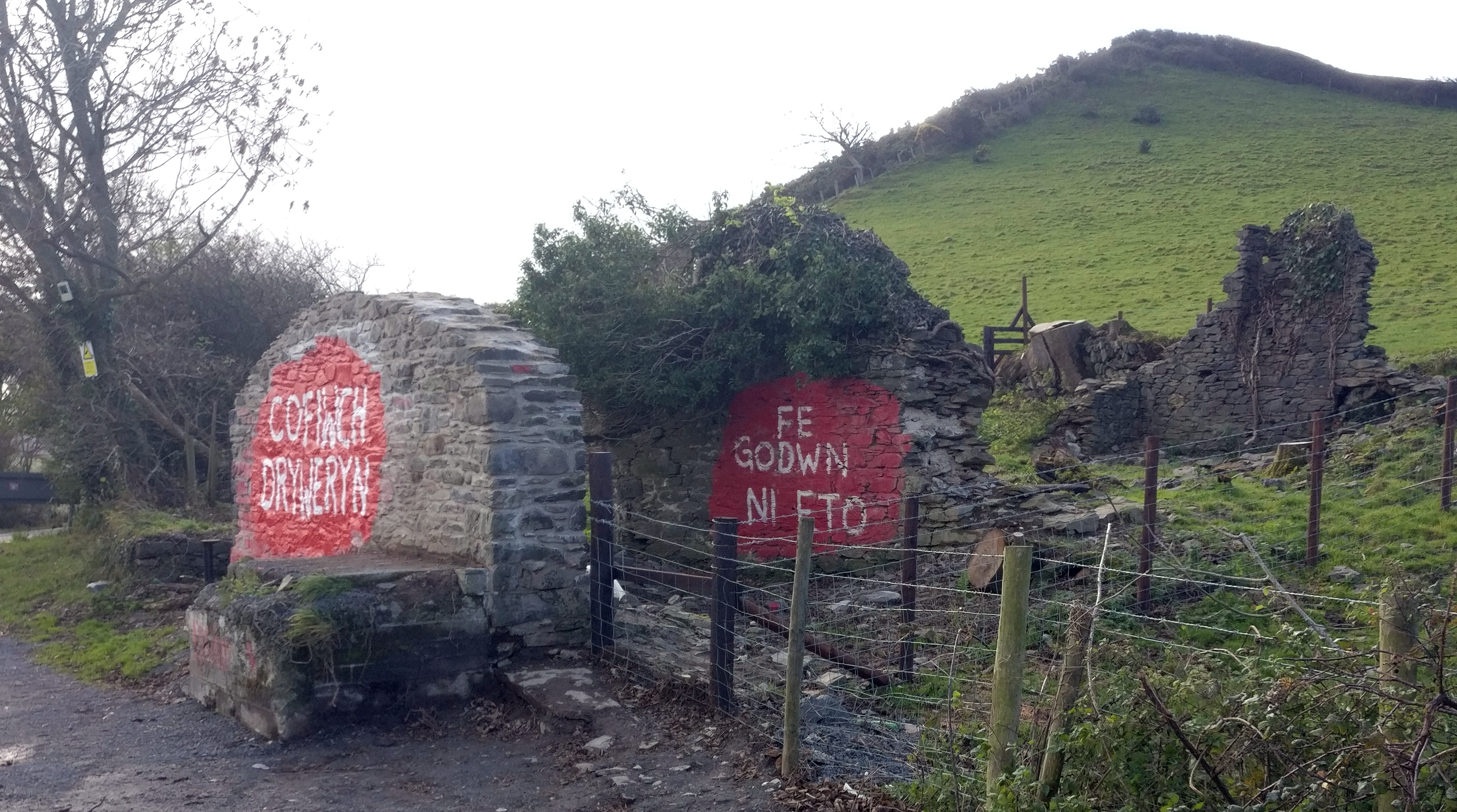
Cofiwch Dryweryn wall after rebuild, October 2020 - more of the original building structure is visible since the surrounding vegetation was removed.

== See also ==
- Mynydd Epynt
- Epynt clearance
- Welsh devolution
