= Epynt clearance =

1940 eviction in Powys, Wales

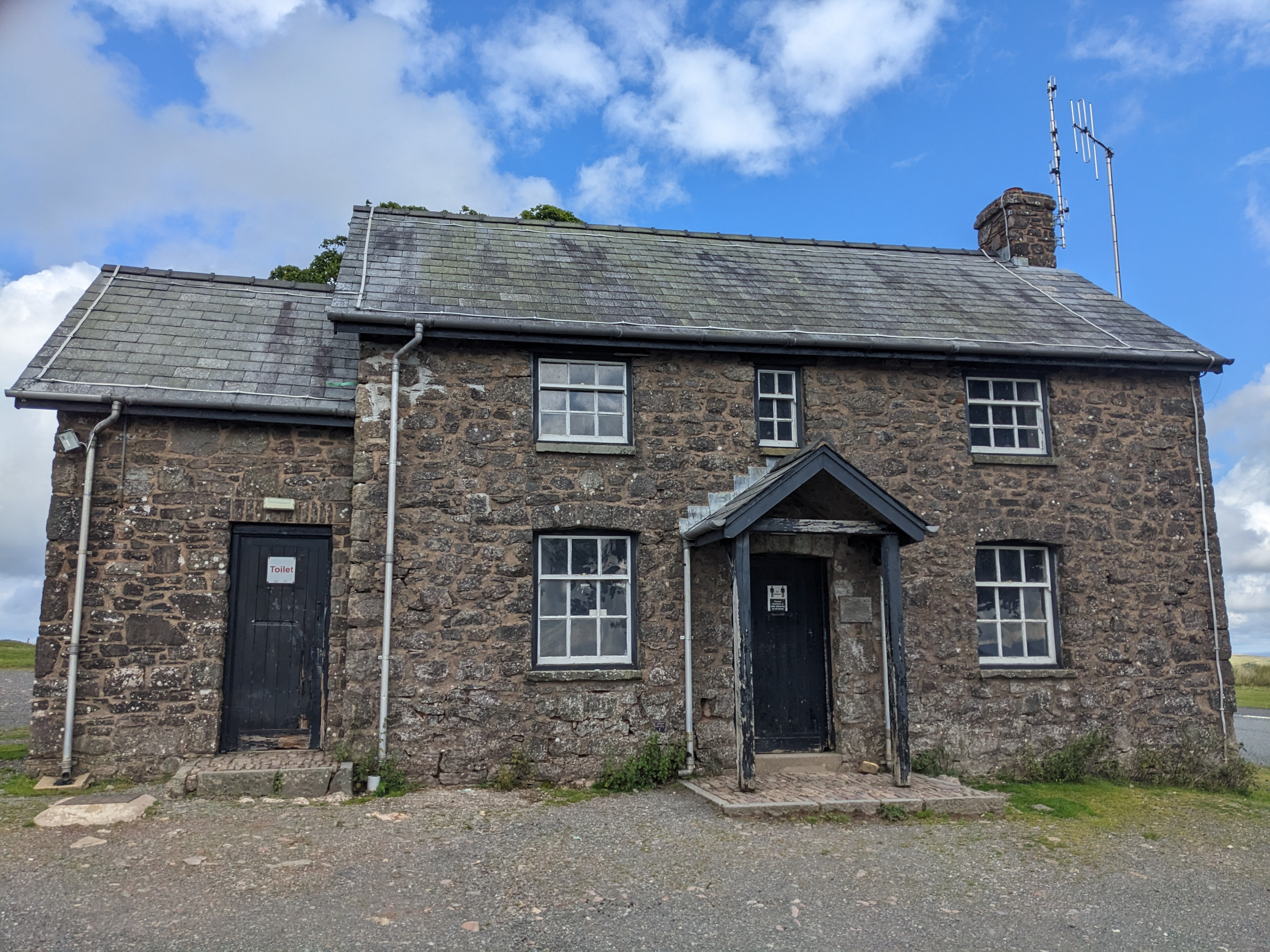
The Drover's Arms, a pub which was part of the eviction

The Epynt clearance (Welsh: Cliriad Epynt; or Y Chwalfa, lit. 'the upheaval') was the 1939 eviction of around 200 people from Mynydd Epynt, Powys, by British military authorities at the onset of the Second World War. As the War Office determined that the area was needed for an artillery training ground, residents of 54 farms and a pub in Mynydd Epynt were notified by letter that they would be evicted from their properties. The War Office proceeded to establish the Sennybridge Training Area on the site of the cleared land. The phrase "Cofiwch Epynt" ('remember Epynt') has been used by Welsh nationalists to commemorate the eviction, in a similar manner to "Cofiwch Dryweryn" ('remember Tryweryn'), which commemorates the eviction of residents of Capel Celyn in the 1960s.

== Clearance and military acquisition ==
In September 1939, a British Army officer, struggling with Welsh orthography, asked children at the local school to identify and locate 52 homes. By December, each of these households had received a notice to vacate their property before the end of April. The letter stressed the importance of the area to the war effort and that they would be compensated for their losses.

A number of Welsh Members of Parliament (MPs) and other prominent figures spoke out against the acquisition. However, this opposition was largely dismissed at the time as being contrary to the war effort. As the evictions took place during the lambing season, some farmers were granted a short extension, but all evictions had been completed by June 1940. In total, 400 people were evicted, with the army seizing an area of 30,000 acres (12,000 hectares). The area now forms the core of the Sennybridge Training Area, the largest military training zone in Wales.

Training operations destroyed most of the original structures which had formed the community of Mynydd Epynt, including chapels and their cemeteries. Despite this, the area saw the construction of an artificial village in 1988. The Fighting In Built Up Areas zone (FIBUA) saw the construction of many mock buildings, including a fake chapel with imitation gravestones.

== Impact of the evictions ==
The evictions, also known as Y Chwalfa ('the clearing') in Welsh, have been described as "the death blow to Welsh-speaking Breconshire" by Euros Lewis. Lewis drew comparisons with the end of the community in Capel Celyn, noting the comparatively young age at death among those evicted and the belief that one resident had "cried himself to death". As those evicted were dispersed into areas where English was more prevalent, the evictions had a significant impact on Y Fro Gymraeg (lit. 'the Welsh-language area'), reducing both its extent in eastern Wales and the number of dialects spoken. The historic trackways over Mynydd Epynt had long been protected as public rights of way, but all routes through the training area were closed following the acquisition.

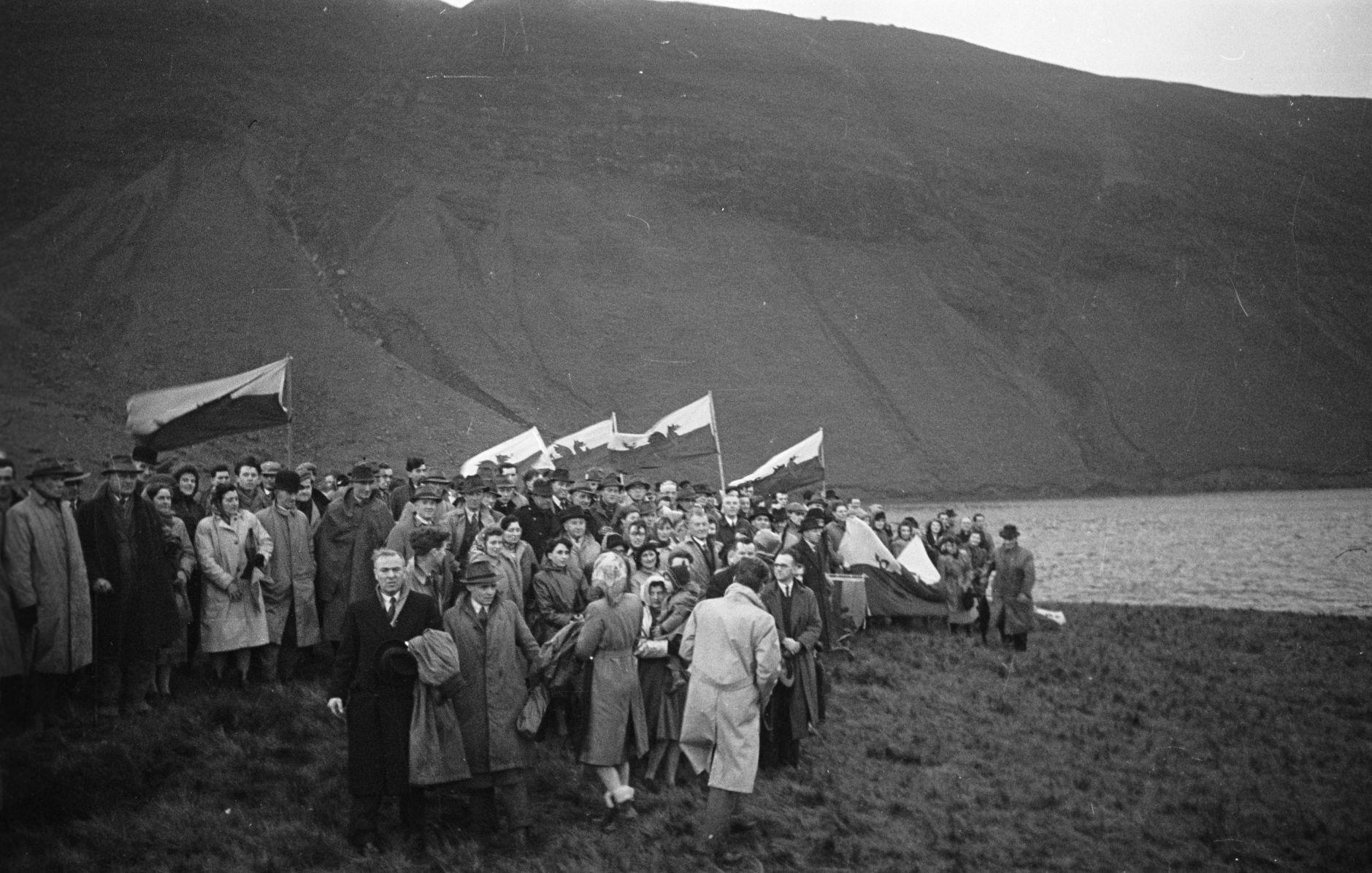
Protestors gathered at Llyn y Fan Fach to oppose the planned acquisition by the War Office, 17 January 1947

Later accounts suggest that many of the evicted believed they would return at the end of the Second World War, with accounts of people leaving their keys in locks, returning to keep the homes in a habitable condition and even continuing to plough the fields. The military had difficulty keeping some former residents away. Thomas Morgan returned to his "Glandŵr" house daily to light a fire in the hearth, protecting the stonework. Morgan was repeatedly warned to stop returning, but continued until his home was destroyed by explosives, with a military officer informing him that "We’ve blown up the farmhouse. You won’t need to come here anymore". Following the conclusion of the Second World War, the British Army's Western Command attempted to acquire further areas of land for military use across Wales, including areas near Trawsfynydd, Tregaron and Llyn y Fan Fach. Plaid Cymru organised a protest campaign in 1947 to oppose the War Office's plans, declaring that the party would not "give an inch".

The evictions were documented by Iorwerth Peate, the curator and founder of the Saint Fagan Folk Museum. Peate made several visits to the area, including on the last day of evictions. Peate evocatively described meeting one of those evicted, at her "Waunlwyd" home. The elderly woman sat motionless and tearful with her back to her house (Peate later discovered that the woman was 82 years old and had been born at the property, as had her father and grandfather). Wary of the solemnity of the occasion and believing he had not been noticed, Peate tried to back away when the woman suddenly asked him where he was from. Peate answered ‘Caerdydd’ (the Welsh name for Cardiff), to which she replied: "Fy machgen bach i, ewch yn ôl yno gynted ag y medrwch" ('My little one, return there as soon as you can'), "Mae’n ddiwedd byd yma" ('it is the end of the world here'). The Welsh phrase, Mae’n ddiwedd byd yma has become associated with the evictions and is the title of the Welsh-language history of Mynydd Epynt published in 1997.

== See also ==
- Tryweryn flooding
- Imber
- Langford
- Tyneham
- Tottington
- The Stanford Battle Area, in Norfolk, contains six villages also taken over for military purposes.
