= Welsh nationalism =

Nationalism in Wales

Flag of Wales

Welsh nationalism (Welsh: Cenedlaetholdeb Cymreig) emphasises and celebrates the distinctiveness of Welsh culture, Welsh language (yr Iaith Gymraeg) and Wales as a nation or country. Welsh nationalism may also include calls for further autonomy or self-determination, which includes Welsh devolution, meaning increased powers for the Senedd, or full Welsh independence.

== History ==
=== Before English conquest ===
Wales first started to be thought of as a distinctive nation shortly after the withdrawal of the Roman Empire as Brythonic speaking people who lived across most of the island of Great Britain at that time. This identity further solidified during the Anglo-Saxon settlement and expansion of Anglo-Saxon kingdoms against native Welsh kingdoms starting around the 6th century. A part of this identity was made of a connection to Rome, with the Emperor Magnus Maximus being a popular figure that sub-Roman kings would claim legitimacy from, and The Dream of Macsen Wledig (Breuddwyd Macsen Wledig) being a popular story about the favour he gave Britain.

The Mabinogion are a collection of Welsh stories, compiled between the 11th to 13th century but are originally older shared oral traditions, with the main Four Branches of the Mabinogi (Pedair Cainc Y Mabinogi) including many pre-Christian elements. This was also the time when King Arthur, a semi-legendary king appeared in Welsh writings as a leader of the Welsh / Britons against Anglo-Saxons, with the earliest sources referencing Arthur being Nennius' Historia Brittonum, and the Annales Cambriae written around the 9th and 10th centuries. Nennius as well as another popular writer Geoffrey of Monmouth's Historia Regum Britanniae (The History of the Kings of Britain) popularised founding mythology of Welsh kings as being descendants of Brutus of Troy, and was considered factual and largely accepted until the 20th century.

The story of Lludd and Llefelys is possibly the origin of the red dragon as a symbol for the nation of Wales, where in the story it fights with a white dragon representing the Anglo-Saxons, this story also appears in the works of Nennius and Geoffrey.

Through most of this time there were many kingdoms in Wales; they also had connections to kingdoms in the north of modern day England, which is identified with the Old North (Hen Ogledd) that remained Brythonic speaking until the 12th century.

For some periods Wales was able to be unified by certain rulers, such as Hywel Dda, Gruffudd ap Llywelyn and Rhodri the Great, but their lands were divided on their deaths because of Wales' traditional gavelkind inheritance. Hywel Dda instituted and codified many legal reforms the Cyfraith Hywel (Laws of Hywel) which would be the basis of most Welsh law until the Laws in Wales Acts 1535-1542.

Wales first appeared as a unified independent country from 1055 to 1063 under the leadership of the only King of Wales to have controlled all the territories of Wales, Gruffydd ap Llywelyn. Three years later the Normans invaded, and briefly controlled much of Wales, but by 1100 Anglo-Norman control of Wales was reduced to the lowland Gwent, Glamorgan, Gower, and Pembroke, regions which underwent considerable Anglo-Norman colonisation, while the contested border region between the Welsh princes and Anglo-Norman barons became known as the Welsh Marches.

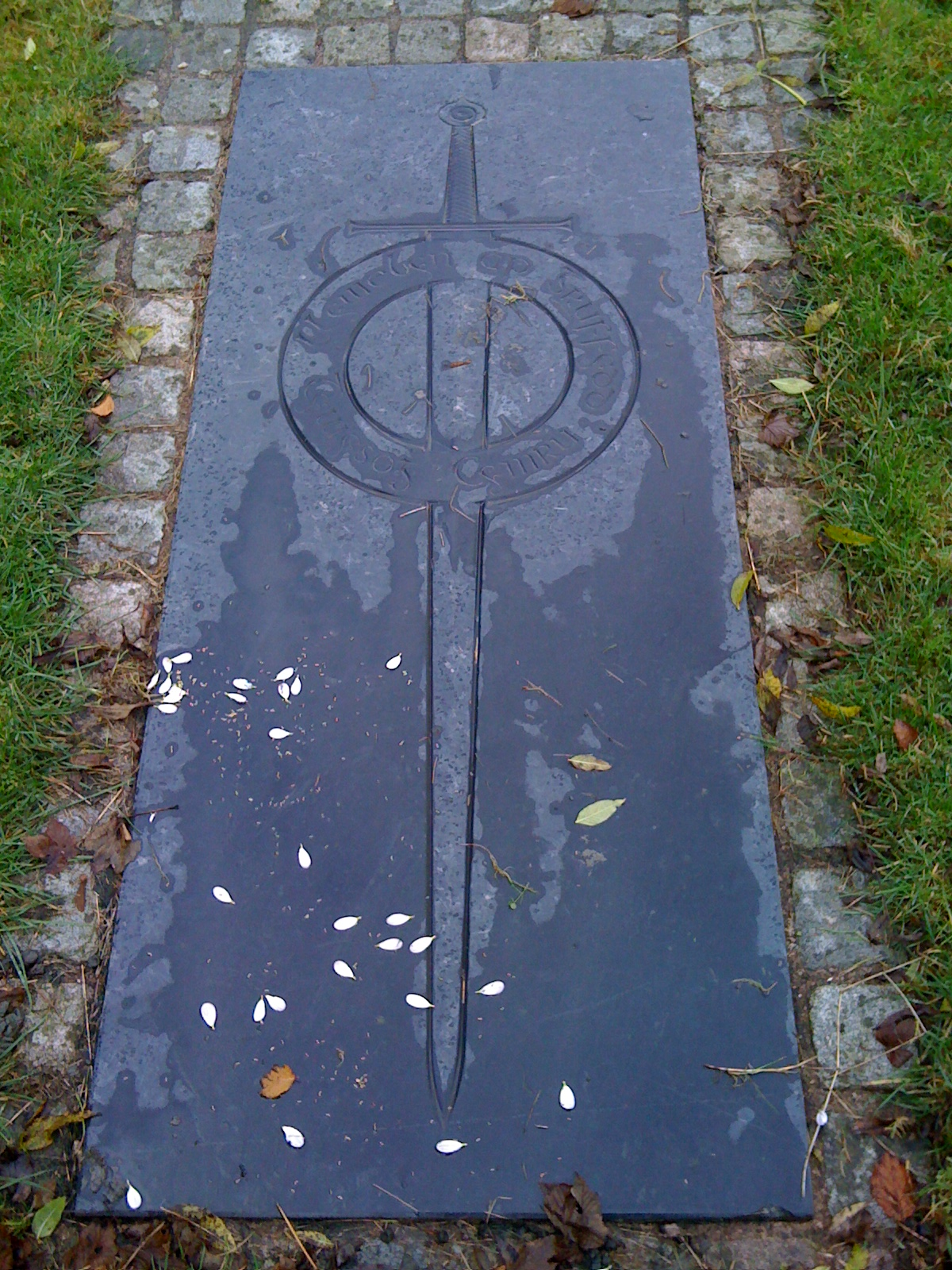
Grave of Llywelyn ap Gruffudd, killed by English forces in 1282

=== English conquest and union ===
Incursions from the English and Normans amplified divisions between Welsh kingdoms. In the 12th century, Norman king Henry II of England exploited differences between the three most powerful Welsh kingdoms, Gwynedd, Powys, and Deheubarth, allowing him to make great gains in Wales. He defeated and then allied with Madog ap Maredudd of Powys in 1157, and used this alliance to overwhelm Owain Gwynedd. He then turned on Rhys ap Gruffydd of Deheubarth, who finally submitted to him in 1171, effectively subjugating much of Wales to Henry's Angevin Empire.

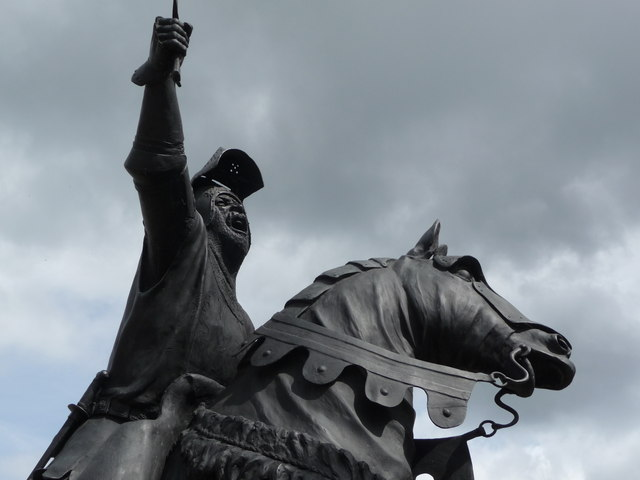
Statue of Owain Glyndŵr in Corwen

In the 13th century, the last prince of Wales, Llywelyn the Last retained his rights to Wales in an agreement with Henry III in the Treaty of Montgomery in 1267. Henry's successor, Edward I, disapproved of Llywelyn's alliance with Simon de Montfort, who revolted along with other barons against the English king in the Second Barons' War of 1264–1267; and so in 1276 Edward's army forced Llywelyn into an agreement that saw Llywelyn withdraw his powers to Gwynedd only. In 1282, whilst attempting to gather support in Cilmeri near Builth Wells, Llywelyn was killed. Llywelyn's brother, Dafydd ap Gruffydd, briefly led a force in Wales, but was captured and later hanged, drawn and quartered.

Since conquest, there have been Welsh rebellions against English rule. The last and most significant revolt was the Glyndŵr Rising of 1400–1415, which briefly restored independence. Owain Glyndŵr held the first Welsh parliament (Senedd) in Machynlleth in 1404, when he was proclaimed Prince of Wales, and a second parliament in 1405 in Harlech. After the eventual defeat of the Glyndŵr rebellion and a brief period of independence, it was not until 1999 that a Welsh legislative body was re-established as the National Assembly of Wales; it was renamed "Senedd Cymru/Welsh Parliament" in 2020.

In the 16th century, King Henry VIII of the Tudor dynasty (a royal house of Welsh origin) together with the English parliament, passed the Laws in Wales Acts, also referred to as the "Acts of Union", which incorporated Wales fully into the Kingdom of England. These were not democratic times, and these laws were passed without any democratic mandate. Nevertheless, their effect was to abolish the Welsh legal system and integrate Wales into the English legal system. These Acts also gave political representation for Wales in the Westminster Parliament. The repressive measures against the Welsh that had been in place since the revolt of Owain Glyndŵr over a century earlier were removed. The Acts also stripped the Welsh language of its official status and role within Wales.

=== 19th century ===
The rapid industrialisation of parts of Wales, especially Merthyr Tydfil and adjoining areas, gave rise to strong and radical Welsh working class movements which led to the Merthyr Rising of 1831, the widespread support for Chartism, and the Newport Rising of 1839.

With the establishment of the Presbyterian Church of Wales, nonconformism triumphed in Wales, and gradually the previous majority of conservative voices within the church allied themselves with the more radical and liberal voices within the older dissenting churches of the Baptists and Congregationalists. This radicalism was exemplified by the Congregationalist minister David Rees of Llanelli, who edited the radical magazine Y Diwygiwr (The Reformer) from 1835 until 1865. But he was not a lone voice: William Rees (also known as Gwilym Hiraethog) established the radical Yr Amserau (The Times) in 1843, and in the same year Samuel Roberts also established another radical magazine, Y Cronicl (The Chronicle). Both were Congregationalist pastors.

Iolo Morganwg was a antiquarian, poet and collector and an important figure in Welsh nationalism by preserving and popularising many Welsh works and traditions. However modern scholars believe some of the manuscripts he "found" were forgeries. He also founded the Gorsedd, a society of Welsh bards that is connected to the modern Eisteddfod, a Welsh literary, musical, and cultural event that Morganwg supported and was revived as the national Eisteddfod in 1861 and has been held almost every year since.

Lady Charlotte Guest is also a notable figure for having translated and published modern editions of the Mabinogion, among other Welsh works.

==== Treason of the Blue Books ====
Welsh nationalists were outraged by the Reports of the Commissioners of Inquiry into the state of education in Wales in 1847. The reports had blue covers, and were ridiculed as Brad y Llyfrau Gleision, or in English, "The Treason of the Blue Books". They found the education system in Wales to be in a dreadful state; they condemned the Welsh language and Nonconformist religion. The commissioners' report is infamously known for its description of Welsh speakers as barbaric and immoral. Ralph Lingen was responsible for the Blue Books of 1846. By contrast the Reverend Henry Longueville Jones, Her Majesty's Inspector of church schools in Wales between 1848 and 1865, led the opposition to subordination to the education department under Lingen. Jones's reports supported bilingual education and praised the work of many church elementary schools. They came under attack in Whitehall. Jones failed to gain full support in Wales because of his Anglicanism and his criticisms of many certified teachers.

==== Liberal Nationalism ====
In the late 19th and early 20th century the Liberal party was the dominant party in Wales, winning the vast majority of Welsh MPs in every election between 1880 and 1918. The two leading figures of Liberalism in Wales and even UK wide were Prime Ministers William Gladstone and David Lloyd George. Following thinkers like Richard Price, and the Welsh Methodist revival of the 18th century which was one of the most significant religious and social movements in the history of Wales, Welsh Liberalism was often viewed as radical. With the popularity of nonconformism in Wales, Gladstone's reforms and then Lloyd George's role in government led to the disestablishment of the Church of England in Wales in 1914.

===== William Gladstone =====
Despite not being born Welsh he married his Welsh wife Catherine, and lived and died in her estate in Hawarden in Flintshire, which is now the location of his library. He was therefore sympathetic to Welsh issues and under his premiership Wales would grow as a distinct political entity. In 1881 the Sunday Closing (Wales) Act was passed prohibiting the sale of alcohol on Sundays in Wales, it was the first act since the annexation of Wales which applied only to Wales. Following the 1881 Aberdare report, Gladstone also passed major education reform acts, founding Cardiff University and Bangor University in 1883 and 1885, and then the University of Wales in 1893 (Aberystwyth University who also formed the University of Wales had been established privately in 1872). He also passed the Welsh Intermediate Education Act in 1889 reforming and expanding access to secondary education in Wales.

===== Cymru Fydd =====
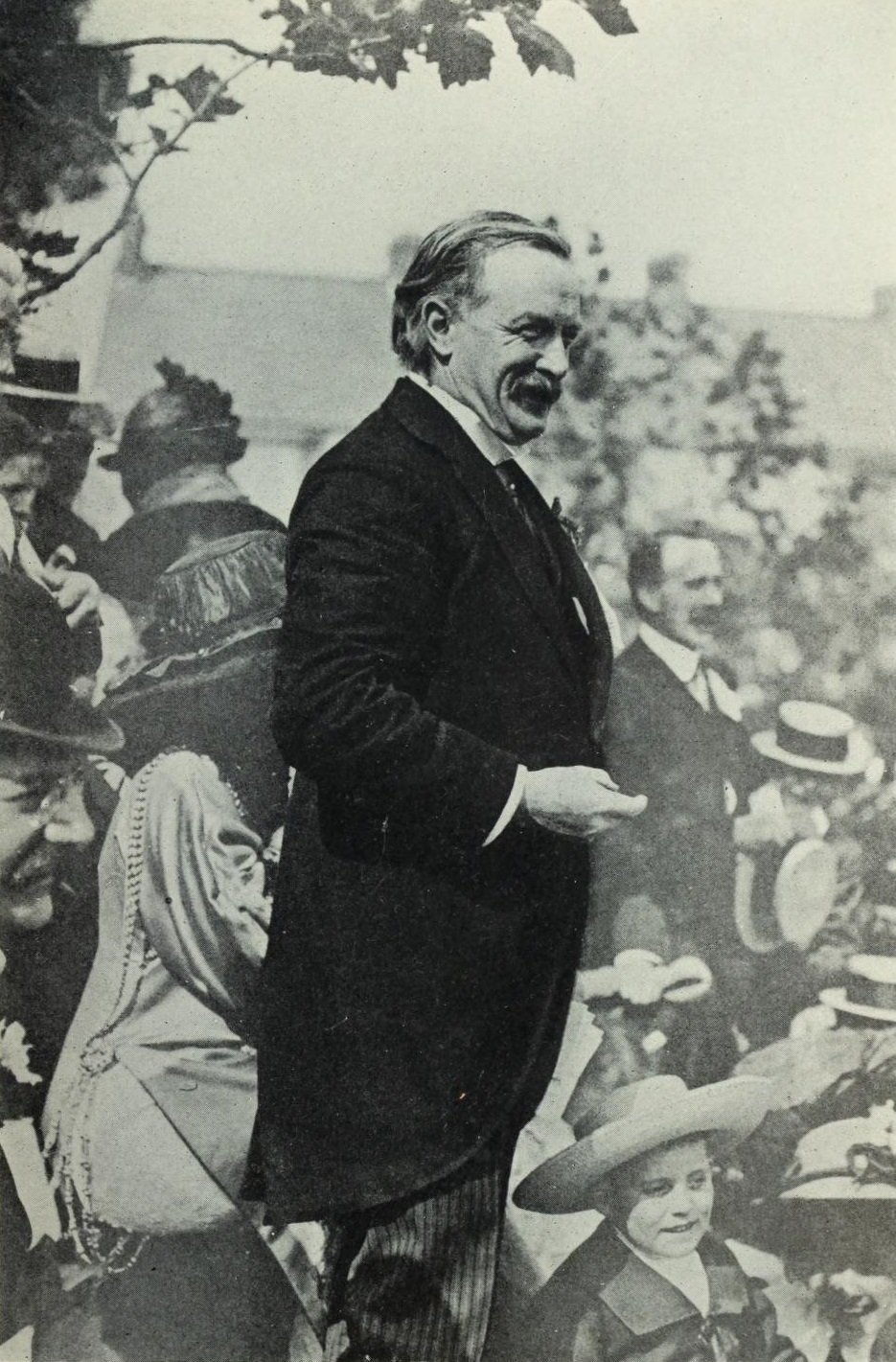
David Lloyd George

Cymru Fydd (The Wales to Come) was an organisation created in 1886 under Gladstone's administration with the aim of establishing Welsh home rule and a "stronger Welsh identity". David Lloyd George was one of its main supporters, and as such Lloyd George was seen as a radical figure in British politics and was associated with the reawakening of Welsh nationalism and identity. In 1880 he said:"Is it not high time that Wales should the powers to manage its own affairs". Historian Emyr Price has referred to him as "the first architect of Welsh devolution and its most famous advocate’" as well as "the pioneering advocate of a powerful parliament for the Welsh people". Lloyd George was also particularly active in attempting to set up a separate Welsh National Party based on Parnell's Irish Parliamentary Party, and also worked to unite the North and South Wales Liberal Federations with Cymru Fydd to form a Welsh National Liberal Federation. The Cymru Fydd movement collapsed in 1896 amid personal rivalries and rifts between Liberal representatives such as David Alfred Thomas.

===== David Lloyd George =====
David Lloyd George was a major figure in Welsh politics, and became the Prime Minister of the UK in 1916. Before his premiership he was influential in other Liberal governments, and was Chancellor under H. H. Asquith. His position meant many Welsh Liberal desires were achieved, particularly the disestablishment of the Church of England in Wales in 1914. Despite his earlier involvement with Cymru Fydd he did not push for Welsh home rule during his premiership, however he did have sympathy for Irish nationalists demanding Irish home rule. In negotiations with Irish leaders he often compared Ireland with Wales and "viewed it through the lens of a Welsh nationalist", showing how a Welsh nation and language could survive without independence, and compared his ability to speak Welsh with their lack of Irish Gaelic. He was a fervent supporter of the British Empire, but did support the idea of Imperial Federation, giving more rights and self-rule to the dominions and other colonies.

==== Industrial period ====
The growth of radicalism and the gradual politicisation of Welsh life did not include any successful attempt to establish a separate political vehicle for promoting Welsh nationalism. Although the Industrial Revolution in Wales did give rise to the patriotic movements, Anglicised influences still held a grip on Wales and had a negative effect on the language and Welsh nationalism. English was still legally the only official language of Wales, and was seen as the language of progress. More and more English migrants came to work in the Welsh mines, and other English influences spread into Wales due to the development of the railways. The Welsh language was left behind by many in favour of English, which was seen as an effective and more progressive language in the new industrialised world. Some, as can be seen from the 1911 census, decided against passing on the Welsh language and culture to future generations in favour of integrating with the English way of life, to improve their chances of success in life through careers and acceptance into the wider community. For the first time in 2000 years the Welsh language was now a minority language in Wales, with only 43.5% of the population speaking the language. Welsh nationalism weakened under the economic pressure as the coal industry of South Wales was increasingly integrated with English industry. On the whole, nationalism was the preserve of antiquarians, not political activists.

=== 20th century ===
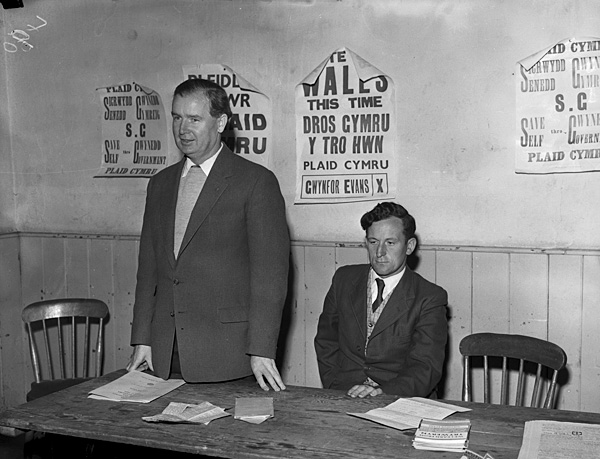
Gwynfor Evans at the 1959 election in Meirionydd

With the rise of the Labour Party in Wales in the early 20th century it overtook the Liberal party as the main party of Wales, winning the majority of Welsh seats in every general election since 1922, and later being the largest party in every Senedd election until the 2026 Senedd election. With the industrial Welsh Valleys being a strong base of Labour support many influential Labour leaders came from Wales or were close to Wales. Notable Labour people from Wales include Aneurin Bevan and leader Neil Kinnock, both from Tredegar, as well as the founder Keir Hardie, leader Michael Foot, and Prime Minister James Callaghan who represented Welsh parliamentary constituencies (Merthyr Tydfil, Ebbw Vale, and Cardiff South).

Left wing members such as Aneurin Bevan who dominated the party in Wales broadly rejected nationalism as a backward reactionary movement that was more favourable to capitalism and not to socialism. Instead they wanted a strong government in London to reshape the entire state economy.

In 1925 Plaid Genedlaethol Cymru ("National Party of Wales") was founded; it was renamed "Plaid Cymru - The Party of Wales" in 1945. The party's principles since its founding are:

1. self government for Wales,
2. to safeguard the culture, traditions, language and economic position of Wales,
3. to secure membership for a self-governing Welsh state in the United Nations.

The party's first Westminster seat (MP) was won by Gwynfor Evans in 1966. By 1974 the party had won three MP seats. In the 2019 general election it won four seats. Following the formation of the Senedd 1999, Plaid Cymru won 17 of 60 seats in the initial Welsh election of 1999 and 43 of 96 MS seats in 2026.

In the 1950s, the dismantling of the British Empire removed a sense of Britishness, and there was a realisation that Wales was not as prosperous as south-east England as well as some other smaller European countries. Successive Conservative Party victories in Westminster led to suggestions that only through self-government could Wales achieve a government reflecting the votes of a Welsh electorate. The Tryweryn flooding, which was voted against by almost every single Welsh MP, suggested that Wales as a nation was powerless. The Epynt clearance in 1940 has also been described as a "significant – but often overlooked – chapter in the history of Wales".

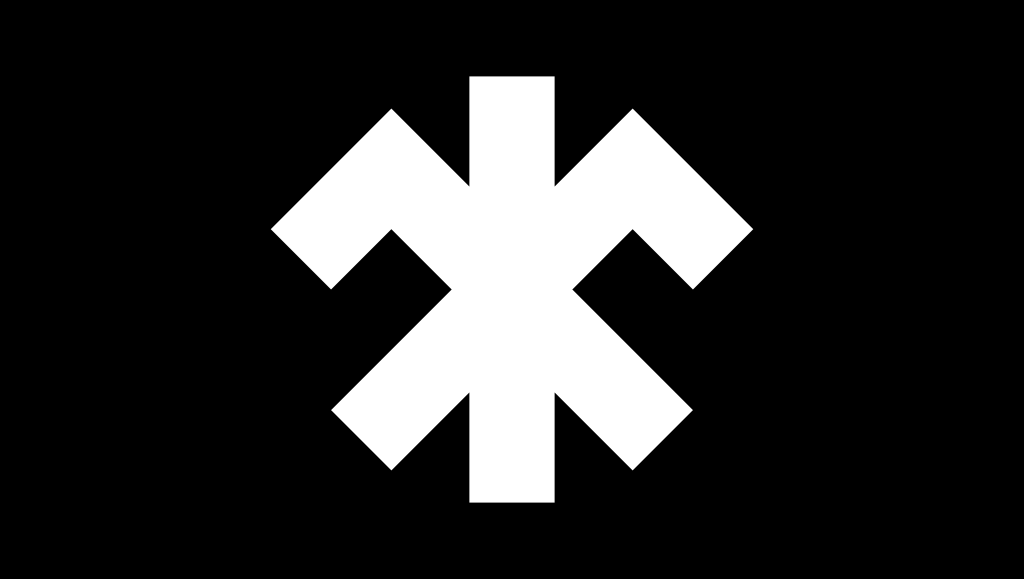
In the 1950s and 1960s, a number of nationalist organisations such as the Welsh Republican Movement, Free Wales Army and National Patriotic Front were active throughout Wales

On 1 July 1955, a conference of all parties was called at Llandrindod by the New Wales Union (Undeb Cymru Fydd) to consider a national petition for the campaign for a Parliament for Wales. The main leader was Megan Lloyd George, the daughter of David Lloyd George, T. I. Ellis, and Sir Ifan ab Owen Edwards. According to the historian William Richard Philip George, "Megan was responsible for removing much prejudice against the idea of a parliament for Wales". She later presented the petition with 250,000 signatures to the British government in April 1956.

The 1961 census showed a decrease in the number and percentage of Welsh speakers in Wales, the lowest ever number up to that point. Following that in 1962 Saunders Lewis the former leader of Plaid Cymru, gave the speech Tynged yr iaith (The Fate of the Language). In this he warned about the possible extinction of the language and the importance of nationalists to protect and promote it, he intended it to motivate Plaid Cymru to take more direct action to support the language. But in response Cymdeithas yr Iaith Gymraeg (The Welsh Language Society) formed to explicitly focus on the language, meanwhile Plaid Cymru focused more on electoral success.

In the 1960s two major events galvanized Welsh nationalism, the Tryweryn flooding where Liverpool council flooded the Welsh valley of Tryweryn and Welsh speaking town of Capel Celyn to create a water reservoir, Llyn Celyn. Plans were introduced in 1955, and it was voted against by 35 of 36 Welsh MPs but it continued, drowning the village in 1965. Plaid Cymru's support rose to 5.2% in 1955, but subsequently decreased slightly until May 1966. In October 1966 the Aberfan disaster happened, where a coal tip collapsed on the town of Aberfan and Pantglas Junior School and a row of houses killing 116 children and 28 adults. £1.75 million were raised by the public as a memorial fund, however £150,000 of that fund was taken by the UK government and National Coal Board (NCB) to remove remaining tips, in 1997 the UK government repaid £150,000, and in 2007 the Welsh government compensated a further £2 million. The 1967 tribunal found the NCB was found responsible for the disaster, but no punishments or fines were ever imposed. This led Plaid Cymru to increase their support in the Valleys, with them almost winning by-elections in Rhondda West in 1967 and Caerffili 1968 with swings of 30% and 40%. They then also more than double their vote to 11.% in 1970.

Following the Kilbrandon Report, in 1979 there was a referendum for devolution in Wales (and Scotland), however it did not pass, with only 20% supporting devolution. Following the defeat, the Conservative government reneged on their promise to establish a Welsh language television station. In response in 1980 Gwynfor Evans went on hunger strike, which was successful leading to the establishment of S4C (Sianel 4 Cymru / Channel 4 Wales).

In 1997 following the election of Labour, they introduced a second referendum on devolution, but this time Labour supported it. This was successful with just 50.3% supporting devolution. This led to the establishment in 1999 of the Welsh Assembly, later renamed Senedd or Welsh Parliament.

=== 21st century ===
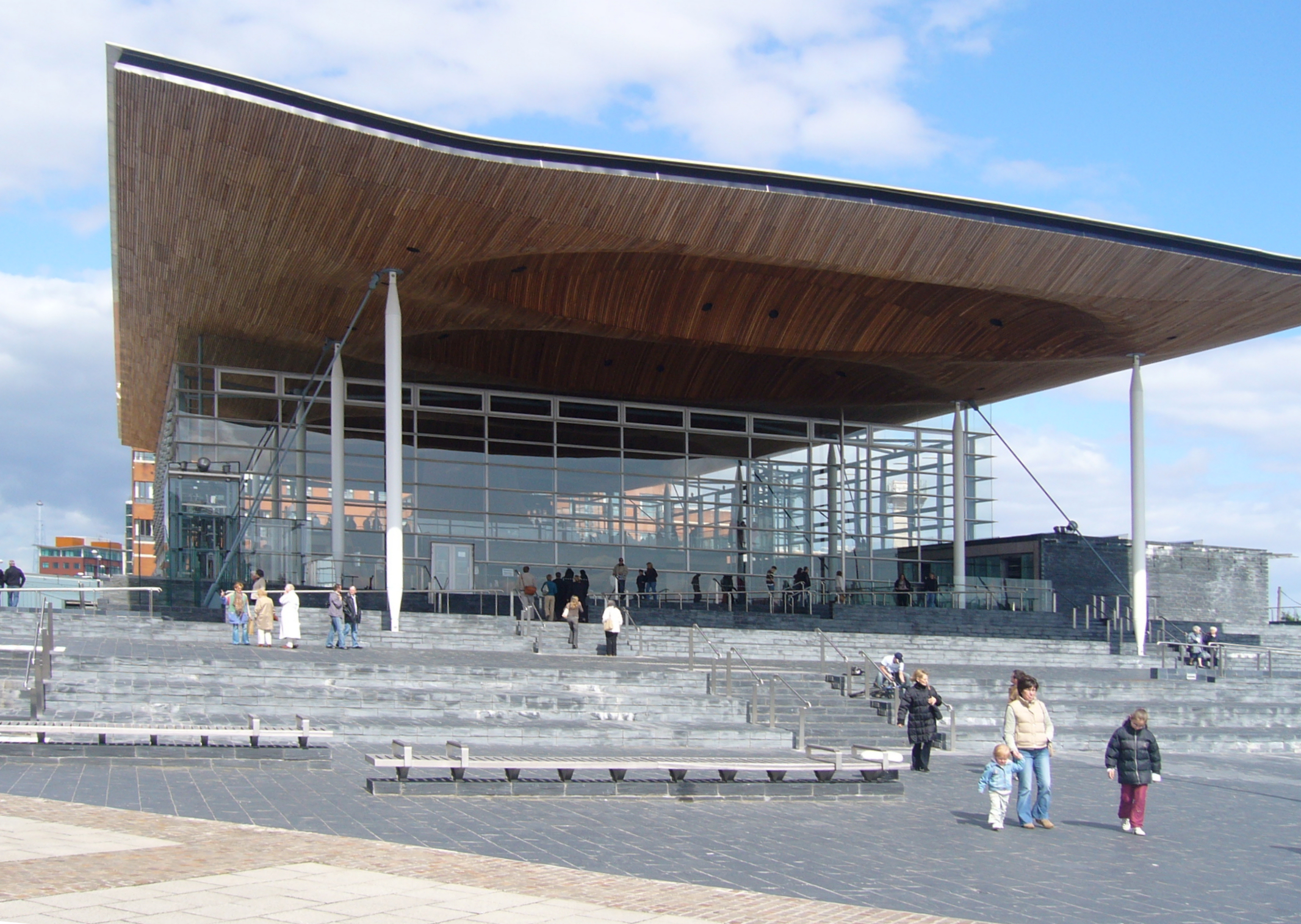
The Senedd building, home to the Senedd, Wales' parliament

- A 2007 survey by BBC Wales Newsnight found that 20% of Welsh people surveyed favoured Wales becoming independent of the United Kingdom.
- There have been calls for a new UK flag or a redesign of the Union Jack which includes representation of Wales. Currently Wales is the only nation within the UK without representation in the UK's flag.
- In 2009 the Archbishop of Wales, Barry Morgan, renewed his call for the then Assembly to be granted full law-making powers, calling for a "greater degree of self-determination" for Wales.
- A YouGov poll taken in September 2015 suggested that 17% of Welsh people would vote for independence. Another poll by Face for Business suggested support could be as high as 28%. These were in stark contrast to the previous two polls conducted by ICM Research for the BBC, which had said support was as low as 5% and 3% respectively.
- The 2016 United Kingdom European Union membership referendum saw the voters in Wales choosing the "Leave" option by 52.5 per cent to 47.5 per cent.
- A Welsh Political Barometer poll, conducted for ITV-Cymru Wales and Cardiff University's Wales Governance Centre from 30 June to 4 July 2016, showed support for Welsh independence had increased after the Brexit vote. Responding to the question "And please imagine a scenario where the rest of the UK left the European Union but Wales could remain a member of the European Union if it became an independent country. If a referendum was then held in Wales about becoming an independent country and this was the question, how would you vote? Should Wales be an independent country?", the results were: Yes: 28%, No: 53%, Would Not Vote/Don't Know: 20%. Removing non-committed voters, 35% of those polled would vote for independence.
- In 2022, Dafydd Iwan's 1983 protest song Yma o Hyd ("Still here") became an anthem for the Welsh World Cup football team. This song is undoubtedly a nationalist song, with lyrics referencing events in Welsh history.
- On 7 May 2026, Plaid Cymru won the most seats in the Senedd and sought to lead a minority government with Rhun ap Iorwerth as First Minister, marking for the first time what would be a Senedd led by the Welsh nationalists

== National symbols ==
1959 version of the Welsh flag

The first official flag of Wales was created in 1953 for the coronation of Queen Elizabeth II. This augmented flag including the Royal badge of Wales was criticised in 1958 by the "Gorsedd y Beirdd", a national Welsh group comprising Welsh literary figures and other notable Welsh people. In 1959 the Welsh flag was changed to a red Welsh dragon on a green and white background. That remains the current flag of Wales today.

The Red Dragon as a symbol for Wales though is much older. It was recorded in the Historia Brittonum, written around 828, where a red dragon, representing Wales is shown in a battle against a white dragon, which came to represent England. Henry VII and the House of Tudor then used the red dragon to demonstrate their descent from Cadwaladr ap Cadwallon, the last of the Briton kings. It was later officially used on the Royal badge of Wales since 1801.

Saint David's Day (1 March) is celebrated as Wales' national day, named for its patron saint, Saint David. The leek is associated with the day and is worn by people as a national symbol, with the tradition possibly originating from a story where Saint David ordered soldiers to wear the leek to identify them against pagan enemies.

The daffodil is also a national symbol of Wales and is called Cenhinen Pedr (Peter's leek).

On 21 December 1955, the Lord Mayor of Cardiff announced to a crowd that Cardiff was now the official capital of Wales, following a parliamentary vote the previous day by Welsh local authority members. Cardiff won the vote with 136 votes compared to second-placed Caernarfon with 11. A campaign for Cardiff to become the capital city had been ongoing for 30 years. Historian James Cowan outlined some reasons why Cardiff was chosen. These included:

- Being the largest city in Wales with a population of 243,632, and
- Buildings in Cathays Park, such as City Hall and the National Museum of Wales among other reasons.

Martin Johnes, a lecturer at Swansea University, claims that with the formation of the devolved assembly in 1999, Cardiff had become "a capital in a meaningful way, as the home of the Welsh government, whereas before, its capital status was irrelevant, it was just symbolic".

== Major active parties and movements ==
- YesCymru is a non party-political campaign for an independent Wales. The organisation was formed in the Summer of 2014 and officially launched on 20 February 2016 in Cardiff.
- Plaid Cymru - The Party of Wales founded in 1925. The party's principles since its founding are (1) self government for Wales, (2) to safeguard the culture traditions, language and economic position of Wales and (3) to secure membership for a self-governing Welsh state in the United Nations.
- Cymdeithas yr Iaith Gymraeg (Welsh Language Society). Established in 1962 by members of Plaid Cymru, it is a pressure group campaigning for Welsh language rights. It uses non-violent direct action in its campaigning, and sees itself as part of the global resistance movement.
- Mudiad Eryr Wen ("Movement of the White Eagle") is a socialist and republican nationalist youth movement. The organisation has engaged in direct action targeting English-language place names on signage.

== Militant nationalism ==
Mainstream nationalism in Wales has traditionally been constitutional in character, while the pacifist influence of Welsh non-conformism persisted both before and after 1939. However, there have been some militant movements in Wales described as Welsh militant nationalism.

- In 1952, a small republican movement, Y Gweriniaethwyr ("The Republicans"), became the first nationalist organisation to engage in violence when it carried out an unsuccessful attempt to bomb a water pipeline linking the Claerwen Reservoir in Mid Wales to Birmingham.
- In the 1960s two movements were established in protest against the drowning of the Tryweryn valley and the 1969 investiture of Charles, Prince of Wales: Mudiad Amddiffyn Cymru ("Movement for the Defence of Wales", also known as MAC) and the Free Wales Army (also known as FWA, in Welsh Byddin Rhyddid Cymru). MAC were responsible for numerous bombing attacks on water pipelines and power lines across Wales. On the eve of the investiture two alleged members of MAC, Alwyn Jones and George Taylor, died when the bomb they were planting outside a Social Security Office in Abergele exploded.
- The late 1970s and the 1980s saw an organisation calling itself Meibion Glyndŵr ("sons of Glyndŵr") responsible for a spate of arson attacks against English holiday homes throughout Wales. In the 1970s, a Welsh Socialist Republican Army arose. Their slogan in English ("Welsh Army for the Welsh Republic") could create an acronym WAWR, a grammatical form of the word gwawr, Welsh for "dawn".

== See also ==
=== In Wales ===
- Welsh independence
- Welsh devolution
- Cofiwch Dryweryn

=== Similar nationalist movements ===
- Irish nationalism
- Irish republicanism
- Scottish nationalism
- Cornish nationalism
- Breton nationalism

=== Celtic movements ===
- Celtic Congress
- Celtic League (political organisation)
- Celts (modern)

== Sources/bibliography ==
- Clewes, Roy (1980), To dream of freedom: the struggle of M.A.C. and the Free Wales Army. Talybont: Y Lolfa. ISBN 0-904864-95-2.
- Butt Philip, Alan. The Welsh question: nationalism in Welsh politics, 1945–1970 (University of Wales Press, 1975).
- Davies, Edmund (1967). Report of the Tribunal Appointed to Inquire into the Disaster at Aberfan on October 21st, 1966 (PDF). London: Her Majesty's Stationery Office. OCLC 209323. Archived (PDF) from the original on 11 March 2018.
- Davies, John (Ed.) (1981), Cymru'n deffro: hanes y Blaid Genedlaethol, 1925–75. Talybont: Y Lolfa. ISBN 0-86243-011-9. A series of essays on the history of the first fifty years of Plaid Cymru.
- Davies, R. R (1997) The Revolt of Owain Glyn Dwr. (Oxford UP, 1997) ISBN 0-19-285336-8.
- Gruffudd, Pyrs. "Remaking Wales: nation-building and the geographical imagination, 1925–1950." Political Geography 14#3 (1995): 219–239.
- Jones, Richard Wyn, and Roger Scully. Wales says yes: devolution and the 2011 Welsh referendum (University of Wales Press, 2012).
- Morgan, Kenneth O. Rebirth of a nation: Wales, 1880–1980 (Clarendon Press, 1981) .
- Morgan, Kenneth O. "Welsh nationalism: The historical background." Journal of Contemporary History 6.1 (1971): 153–172. in JSTOR
- Morgan, K. O. (1971), 'Radicalism and nationalism'. In A. J. Roderick (Ed.), Wales through the ages. Vol II: Modern Wales, pp. 193–200. Llandybïe: Christopher Davies (Publishers) Ltd. ISBN 0-7154-0292-7.
- Wyn Thomas, 'Hands Off Wales: Nationhood and Militancy (Gomer, 2013). ISBN 978-1-84851-669-4
- Williams, G. A, When Was Wales?: A History of the Welsh. London. Black Raven Press, ISBN 0-85159-003-9
- Humphries, John, "Freedom Fighters: Wales' forgotten war, 1963–1993," Cardiff, University of Wales Press, ISBN 978-0-7083-2177-5.
