= Meic Stephens =

Welsh literary editor, journalist (1938–2018)

- Born: 23 July 1938; Treforest, Glamorgan, Wales
- Died: 2 July 2018 (aged 79); Cardiff, Wales
- Occupations: Literary editor, journalist, author, teacher, university professor
- Notable work: The Oxford Companion to the Literature of Wales (1986)

Meic Stephens, FLSW (23 July 1938 – 2 July 2018) was a Welsh literary editor, journalist, translator, and poet.

== Birth and education ==
Meic Stephens was born on 23 July 1938 in the village of Treforest, near Pontypridd, Glamorgan. He was educated at Pontypridd Boys' Grammar School and then studied at the University College of Wales, Aberystwyth, graduating in 1961, at the University of Rennes, Brittany, and the University College of North Wales, Bangor, Gwynedd.

== Career ==
From 1962 to 1966 he taught French at Ebbw Vale, Monmouthshire. In Merthyr Tydfil he established the Triskel Press and in 1965 he began the periodical, Poetry Wales. He learnt Welsh as an adult, and became a member of the Welsh Language Society (Welsh: Cymdeithas yr Iaith Cymraeg) and of Plaid Cymru.

After working for the Western Mail for almost a year, from 1967 to 1990 Stephens was literature director of the Welsh Arts Council. Before retiring he was professor of Welsh Writing in English at the University of Glamorgan. He was also a visiting professor in the English department of Brigham Young University in Provo, Utah.

Stephens is credited as the first person to create the Cofiwch Dryweryn graffiti near Llanrhystyd, Ceredigion. This painted slogan has come to be regarded as an unofficial "national landmark" commemorating Capel Celyn, a Welsh-speaking village near Bala, which was destroyed by the construction of the Llyn Celyn reservoir in the early 1960s.

== Writings ==
Stephens wrote many articles about literature in Wales for the Western Mail, as well as obituaries of eminent Welsh people for The Independent. He took a particular interest in the life and work of Rhys Davies, the novelist and short story writer, and founded and served as secretary of the Rhys Davies Trust, which promoted the writing of short fiction in Wales.

Stephens's works include:

- Linguistic Minorities in Western Europe (1976. J. D. Lewis ISBN 9780850883626)
- Green Horse (1978. ISBN 9780715404867)
- [ed.] The Oxford Companion to the Literature of Wales (1986; republished in 1998 as The New Companion to the Literature of Wales. Oxford University Press ISBN 9780192115867)
- Illuminations: An Anthology of Welsh Short Prose (1998. Welsh Academic Press ISBN 9781860570100)
- A Most Peculiar People: Quotations About Wales and the Welsh (1992. University of Wales Press ISBN 9780708311684)
- Little Book of Welsh Quotations (1997. Appletree Press ISBN 9780862817039)
- A Pocket Guide Series: Wales in Quotation (1999. University of Wales Press ISBN 9780708315606)
- Welsh Names for Your Children: The Complete Guide (2000. Y Lolfa ISBN 9781847714305)
- The Literary Pilgrim in Wales: A Guide to the Places Associated with Writers in Wales (2000. Gwasg Carreg Gwalch ISBN 9780863816123)
- A Semester in Zion: A Journal with Memoirs (2003. Gwasg Carreg Gwalch ISBN 9780863818493)
- Yeah, Dai Dando (2008. Cinnamon ISBN 9781905614592)
- A Bard for Highgrove: A Likely Story (2010. Cambria Books ISBN 9781844269341)
- Cofnodion – Hunangofiant (2012. Y Lolfa ISBN 9781847714305)
- Welsh Lives – Gone but Not Forgotten (2012. Y Lolfa ISBN 9781847714879)
- Rhys Davies: A Writer's Life (2013. Parthian Books ISBN 9781908946713)
- Wilia – Cerddi 2003–2013 (2014. Cyhoeddiadau Barddas ISBN 9781906396701)
- My Shoulder to the Wheel (2015. Y Lolfa ISBN 9781784610746)
- The Old Red Tongue: An Anthology of Welsh Literature (2017. Francis Boutle Publishers ISBN 9780995747319)
- More Welsh Lives (2018. Y Lolfa ISBN 9781860570186)
- Luis Núñez Astrain, The Basques: Their Struggle for Independence (translation) (1997. Welsh Academic Press ISBN 9781860570186)

== Honours ==
In 2016, Stephens was elected as a fellow of the Learned Society of Wales.

Stephens was honoured as a Fellow of Aberystwyth University in 2018.

== Death ==
Stephens died in Cardiff on 2 July 2018. He had four children; his son Huw Stephens is a radio and television presenter.
