= Dafydd Roberts =

Welsh activist (1892–1965)

- Born: 18 August 1892; Capel Celyn
- Died: 11 October 1965 (aged 73)
- Occupation: Activist

Dafydd Roberts (18 August 1892 – 11 October 1965) was an activist and chairman of the Capel Celyn Defence Committee during the movement to save the village of Capel Celyn, which was flooded to create the Treweryn Reservoir.

== Life ==
Roberts was born in Weirglodd-ddu, Capel Celyn, Merionethshire, the youngest son of John and Margaret Roberts. He resided in the village for the greater part of his life before moving down the valley to a farm called Cae Fadog. In addition to farming, Roberts worked as a postman for over 40 years. He became an Elder at the local chapel. In 1960, a private bill sponsored by Liverpool City Council was brought before Parliament to develop a water reservoir in the Tryweryn Valley. The development would include the flooding of Capel Celyn.

The residents were initially reserved and shy, but they were encouraged by Elizabeth May Watkin Jones who was a local teacher. They became angry and protested, and Roberts was chosen as the executive of the Capel Celyn Defence Committee, with Elizabeth Jones as the secretary. Jones coordinated the many letters they received with support, and appeared in television interviews with her harp.

Roberts went with Elizabeth Jones, Gwynfor Evans and Dr. Tudur Jones to London and Liverpool to protest against the forced evacuation of the village. The story of Capel Celyn was widely reported in the press, but ultimately the cause was lost and construction began on the dam.

Like many others from Capel Celyn, Roberts moved to Bala, where he died on 11 October 1965, aged 73, shortly before the official opening of the reservoir.
