= Elizabeth Watkin Jones =

Welsh teacher and campaigner (1907–1965)

- Born: Elizabeth May Watkin Jones; 10 May 1907; Capel Celyn, Wales
- Died: 21 June 1965 (aged 58); Wrexham, Wales
- Other name: Elizabeth May Watkin Mrowiec
- Occupation: teacher
- Known for: protesting the flooding of her Welsh village
- Spouse: Josef Mrowiec (m. 1958)

Elizabeth May Watkin Mrowiec (née Jones; 10 May 1907 – 21 June 1965) was a Welsh teacher and campaigner. She was a leading figure in the protests over the flooding of the Tryweryn Valley.

== Life ==
Jones was born on 10 May 1907, in Capel Celyn, where her family lived in the local post office. Her mother was Annie (born Thomas), who was a teacher. Her father, Watkin Jones (Watcyn o Feirion) was the postmaster and a singer who was accompanied by a harp. She grew up in a culture filled home since her father won prizes for his poetry at Eisteddfods.

In 1960, a private member's bill was proposed by Liverpool City Council to create a huge reservoir in the Tryweryn Valley at the end of 1965. The development meant that Capel Celyn would be part of the water surface area of the reservoir and subsequently be flooded. Because the development was an Act of Parliament, the proposal did not need local support.

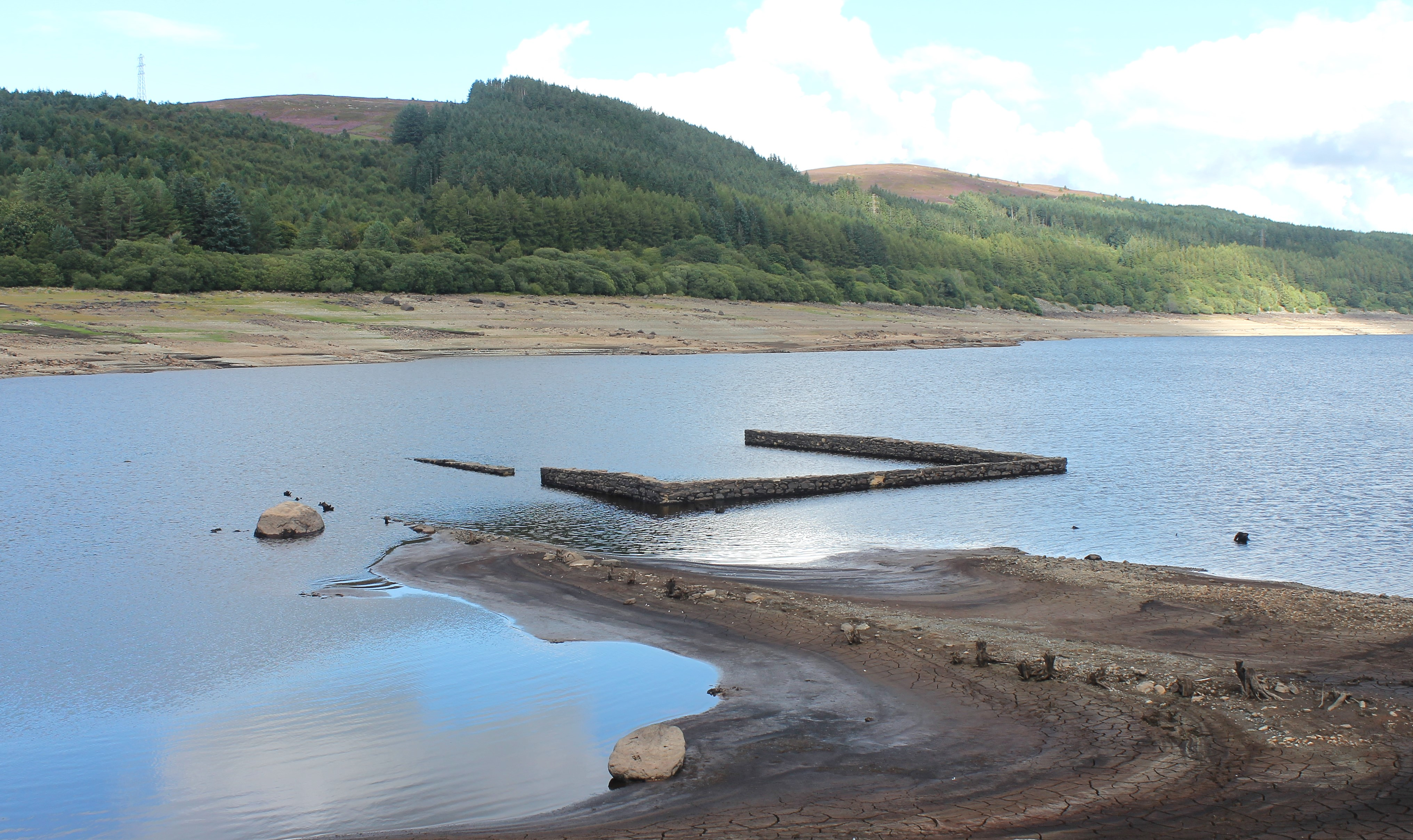
Her home village returns to the surface during a drought in 2022

The residents of Capel Celyn were slow at first, but with encouragement from Jones, protested against the project. Dafydd Roberts was chosen as the executive of the Capel Celyn Defence Committee with Jones as the secretary. Jones coordinated the many letters of support they received and appeared in television interviews with her harp.

Jones, Roberts and Welsh politician Gwynfor Evans went to London and Liverpool to protest against the abandonment and flooding of the village. The fate of Capel Celyn was widely reported. The protests was a lost cause and construction began on the dam. The event was significant in Welsh politics.

On 24 May 1958, she married Josef Mrowiec, a Polish soldier who had fled the Nazis and served in the British Army. She visited Poland with him in 1960 and 1962 and, based on these visits, she won the local eisteddfod category with her travel journal.

Jones died in Wrexham on 21 June 1965, aged 58. Her book, Teithio Pwyl, was published in the same year.
