= Llyn Celyn =

Artificial lake near Bala in Gwynedd, north Wales

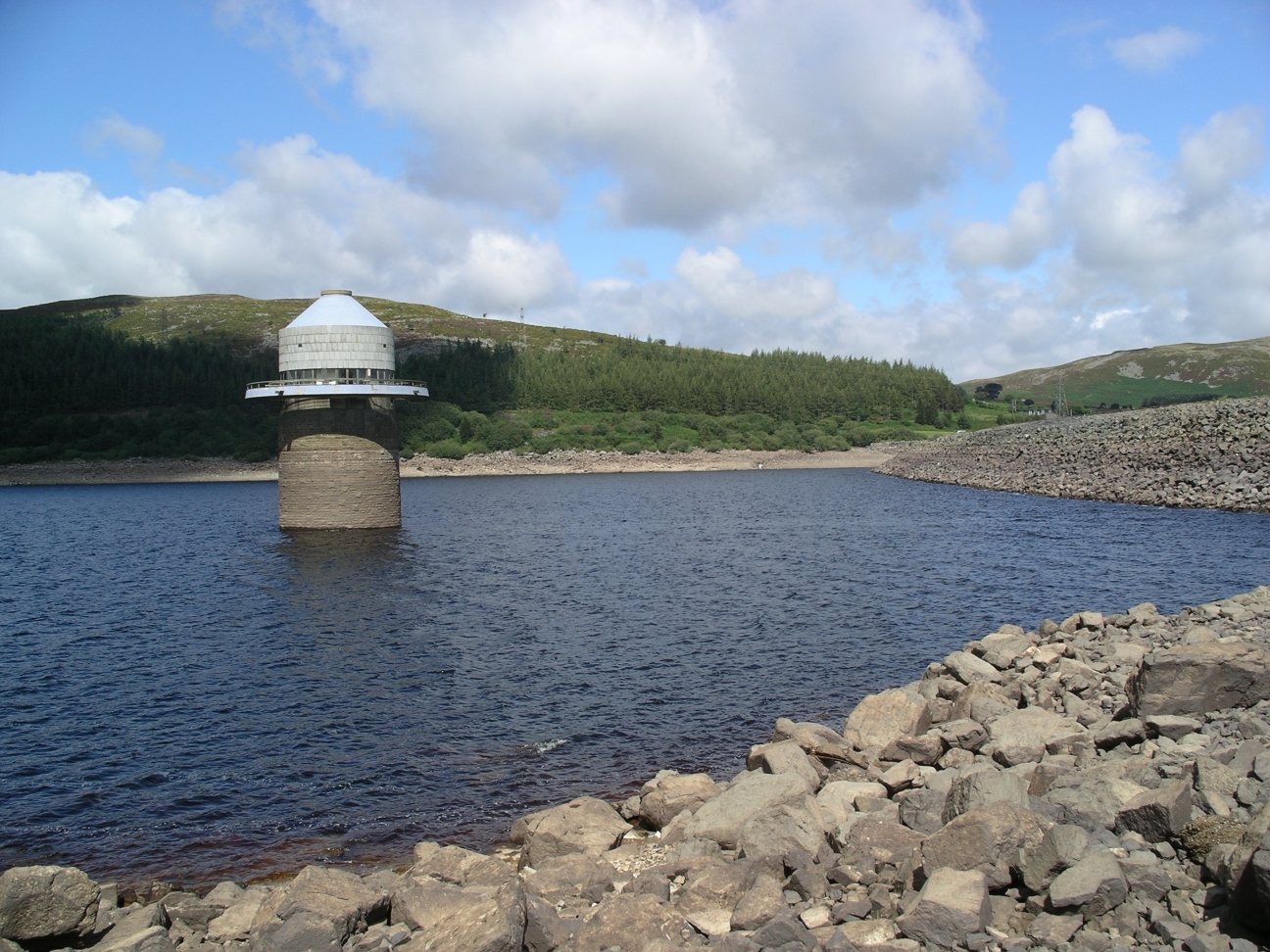

- Location within Gwynedd
- Location: Wales
- Coordinates: 52°57′0″N 3°41′38″W
- Type: Reservoir
- Basin countries: United Kingdom
- Max. length: 2.5 mi (4.0 km)
- Surface area: 320 hectares (790 acres)
- Max. depth: 140 ft (43 m)

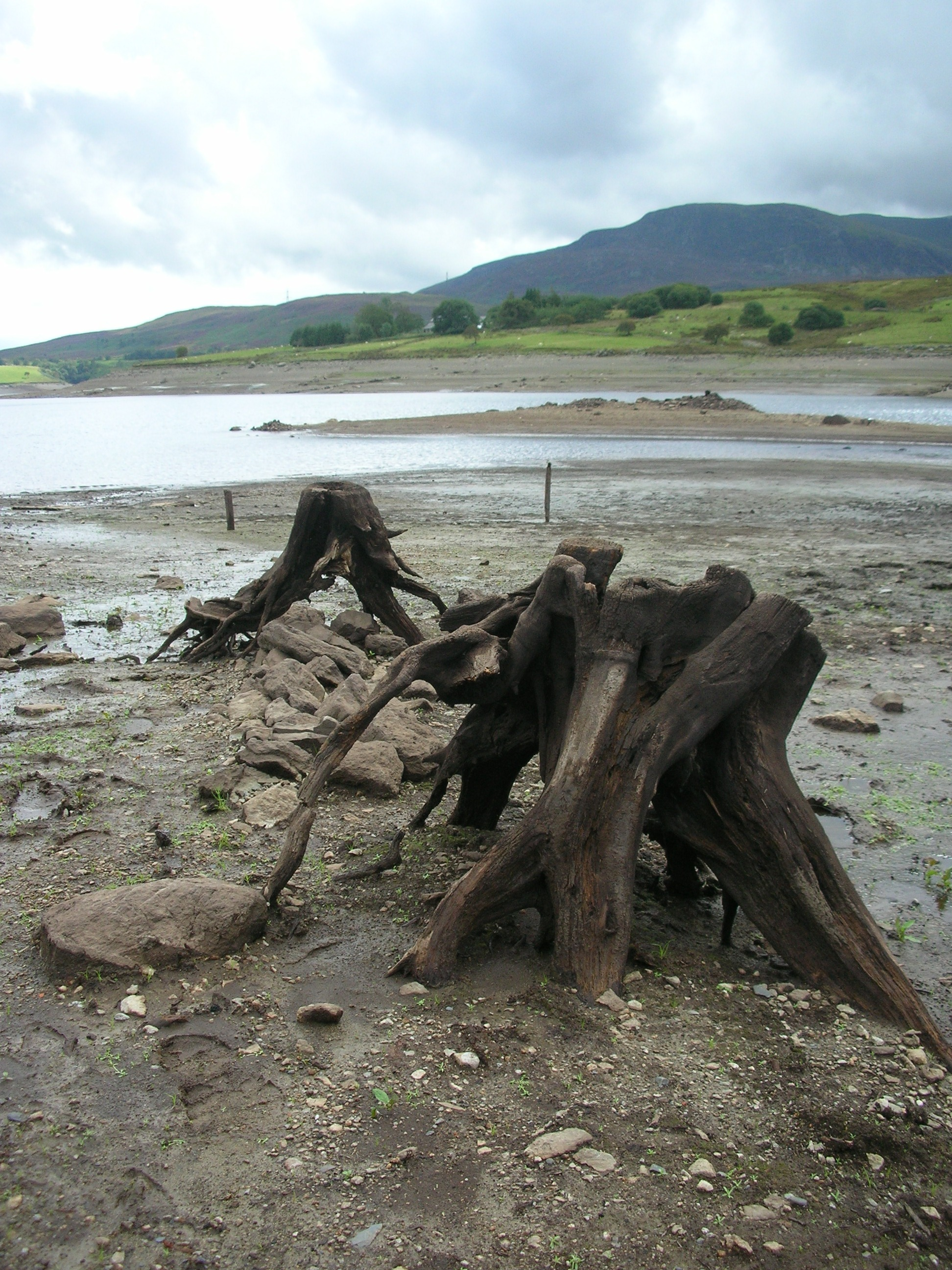
Tree stumps exposed by low water level of reservoir

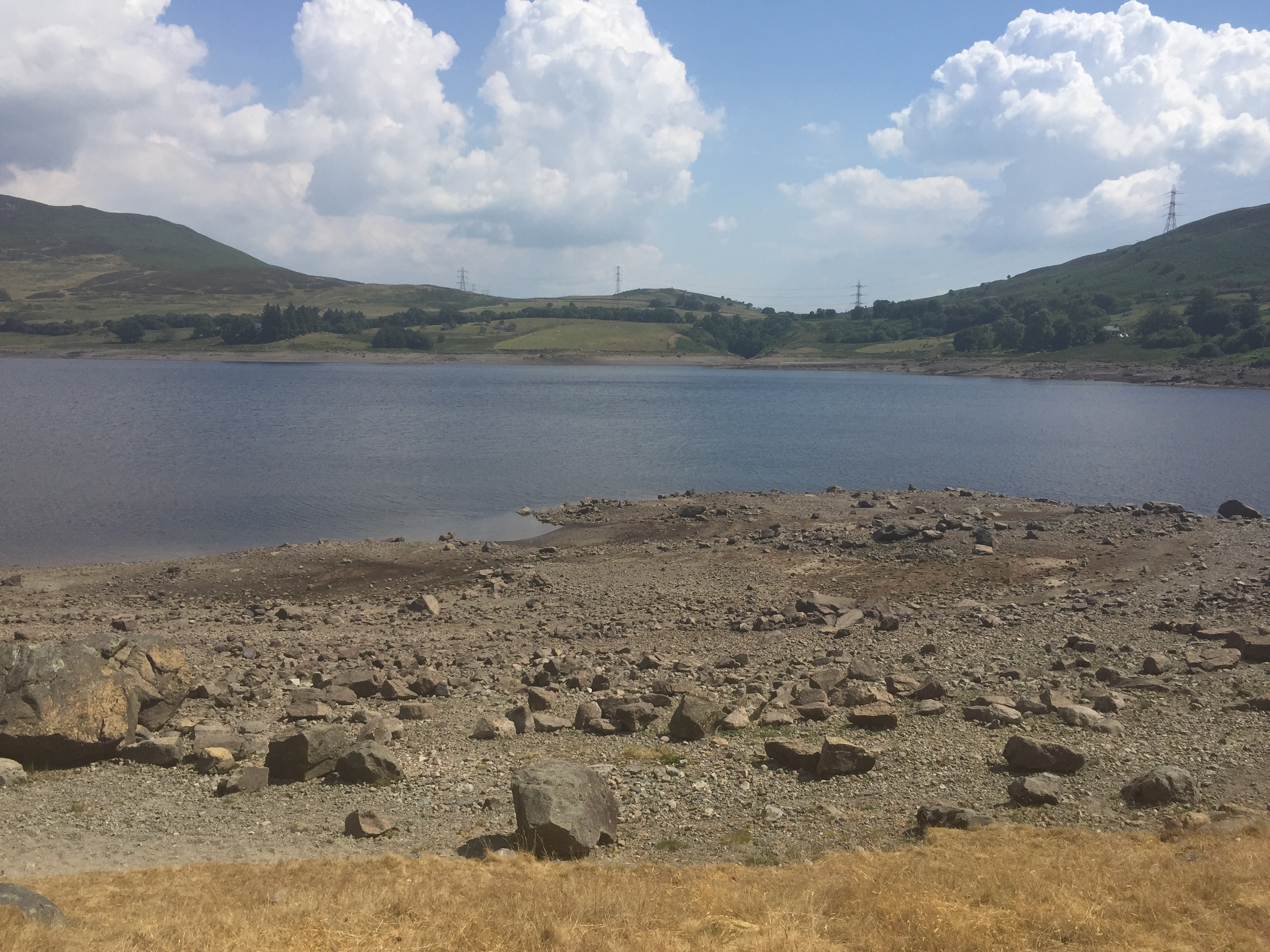
Llyn Celyn during the extended hot spell of summer 2018, showing low water levels.

Llyn Celyn (Welsh pronunciation: [ɬɨ̞n ˈkɛlɨ̞n]) is a reservoir constructed between 1960 and 1965 including the highly controversial Tryweryn flooding in the valley of the River Tryweryn in Gwynedd, Wales. This included the forcible removal of the Capel Celyn village residents despite protest and opposition of Welsh MPs.

With an area of 320 hectares (1.2 sq mi), it measures roughly 2.5 miles (4.0 km) long by 1 mile (1.6 km) wide, and has a maximum depth of 140 ft (43 m). It has the capacity to hold 71,200,000 cubic metres (93,100,000 cu yd) of water.

It was originally to be named Llyn Tryweryn Mawr (meaning "great Tryweryn lake"), but in September 1964 Liverpool Corporation agreed to the name change following a letter from the Tryweryn Defence Committee.

== Construction and opposition ==
Construction of the reservoir for Liverpool Corporation Waterworks involved flooding the village of Capel Celyn and adjacent farmland, a deeply controversial move. Much of the opposition was brought about because the village was a stronghold of Welsh culture and the Welsh language, whilst the reservoir was being built to supply water to Liverpool and parts of the Wirral peninsula in England, rather than Wales.

Liverpool Corporation Act 1957
- Act of Parliament
- Parliament of the United Kingdom
- Long title: An Act to authorise the lord mayor aldermen and citizens of the city of Liverpool to construct additional waterworks and other works connected therewith to acquire lands to make further provision in relation to their water undertaking and for other purposes.
- Citation: 5 & 6 Eliz. 2. c. xlii

Dates
- Royal assent: 1 August 1957

Text of statute as originally enacted

Liverpool Corporation's Tryweryn Reservoir Bill was presented in Parliament as a private bill in January 1957; by obtaining authority through an act of Parliament, Liverpool City Council avoided having to gain consent from the Welsh planning authorities. The legislation enabling the development was ultimately passed as the Liverpool Corporation Act 1957 (5 & 6 Eliz. 2. c. xlii), despite mass protests in Wales, marches through Liverpool by Capel Celyn residents and their supporters, and the opposition of 35 out of 36 Welsh Members of Parliament, with the 36th (David Llywelyn, Conservative MP for Cardiff North) abstaining. This led to an increase in support for the Welsh nationalist party, Plaid Cymru, in the late 1950s and gave fresh impetus to Welsh devolution.

The official opening was held on 21 or 28 October 1965. Representatives came from Liverpool City Council, and invitations were sent to all those with family links to the valley. In view of the anticipated protest, there was a strong police presence. The ceremony lasted less than three minutes, as protesters had cut the microphone wires, and the chants of the hundreds of protesters made the speeches inaudible.

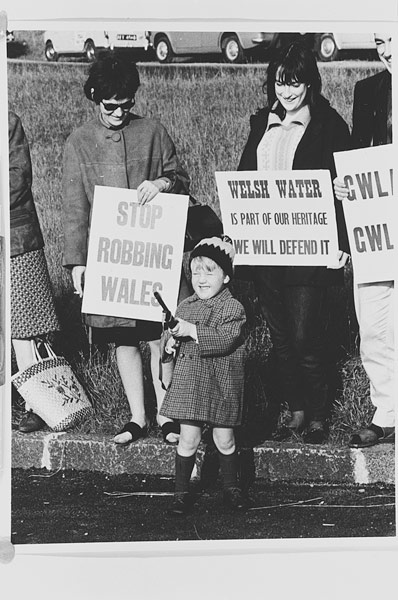
Protests at the official opening of Llyn Celyn

In October 2005, Liverpool City Council issued a public apology, which read:

The Council acknowledges its debt to the many thousands of Welsh people who have made their homes in the City. They have, in so many ways, enriched the life of the City.

We know that Liverpool, especially in the fields of medicine and education, has been of real service to the people of Wales.

We realise the hurt of forty years ago when the Tryweryn Valley was transformed into a reservoir to help meet the water needs of Liverpool.

For any insensitivity by our predecessor Council at that time, we apologise and hope that the historic and sound relationship between Liverpool and Wales can be completely restored.

== Operation of reservoir ==
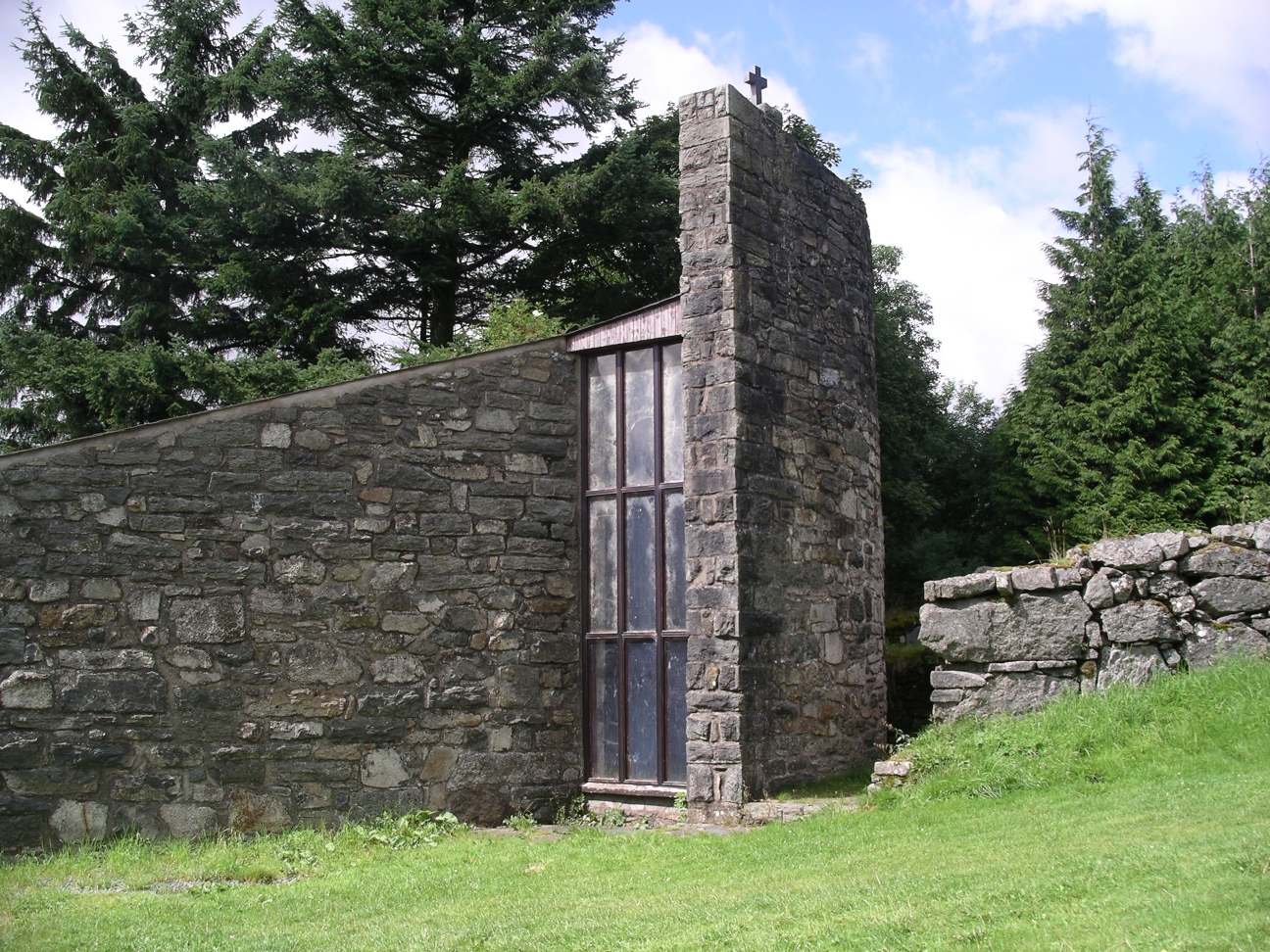
Tryweryn memorial chapel at Llyn Celyn

The reservoir was built to help maintain the flow in the River Dee, so that drinking water could be abstracted further downstream as part of the Dee Regulation Scheme. These abstractions include one at Huntington water treatment works in Chester, operated by United Utilities, which supplies water to Liverpool and Wirral.

The reservoir is contained behind a rock gravity dam and, at its upper end, it is bounded between Arenig Fawr and Arenig Fach, two of the mountains of south Snowdonia.

Water is released from the reservoir into the River Tryweryn which flows into the River Dee. Most of the water passes through a small hydro-electric plant to supply green electricity to the National Grid. The released water first flows into a stilling basin and then down the narrow and rocky valley of the River Tryweryn. This section of the river provides facilities for international level white-water canoeing, and rafting at the Canolfan Tryweryn National White-water Centre. Some water in the reservoir is held in reserve to be released down the river for specific whitewater events. Because the reservoir's principal purpose is to support low river flows in the main River Dee, the best conditions for such events occur during long dry spells in summer when maximum releases are made. Usually the dam will release between 9 and 11 m³/s, although releases as low as 2 m³/s and as high as 16 m³/s have been known. During wet weather the releases are usually throttled back to a minimal maintenance flow unless a planned release for recreational activities has been agreed.

Its four turbines are owned and run by Dŵr Cymru and generate 4.38 MW

== Diversions and closures of transport links ==
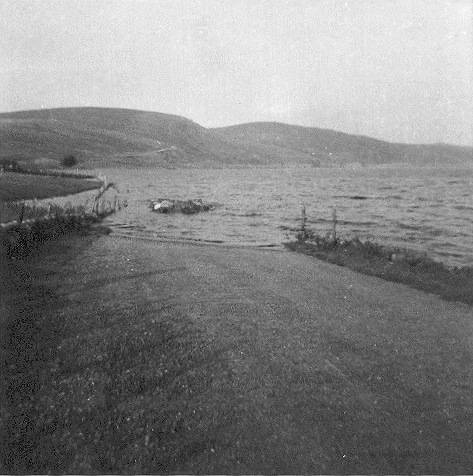
The old B4391 road, disappearing into the western end of Llyn Celyn, August 1965.

The building of the reservoir also contributed to the final closure of the Great Western Railway (GWR) branch line from Bala to Blaenau Ffestiniog. Passenger trains had ceased running in 1960, and the last freight train ran in 1961. The line was subsequently flooded by the lake, and the base of the dam also crosses it. Liverpool Council had in fact planned a railway diversion, but this was never built as the British Transport Commission had decided to close the line. As a result of this, Liverpool Council decided to contribute towards the cost of the new main road (the A4212, which was built across the pass from Bala to Trawsfynydd around the north side of the lake), and also towards the cost of a line linking the two stations in Blaenau Ffestiniog.

== See also ==
- Cofiwch Dryweryn
