= Capel Celyn =

Submerged village in Gwynedd, Wales

Coordinates: 52°57′10″N 3°42′43″W

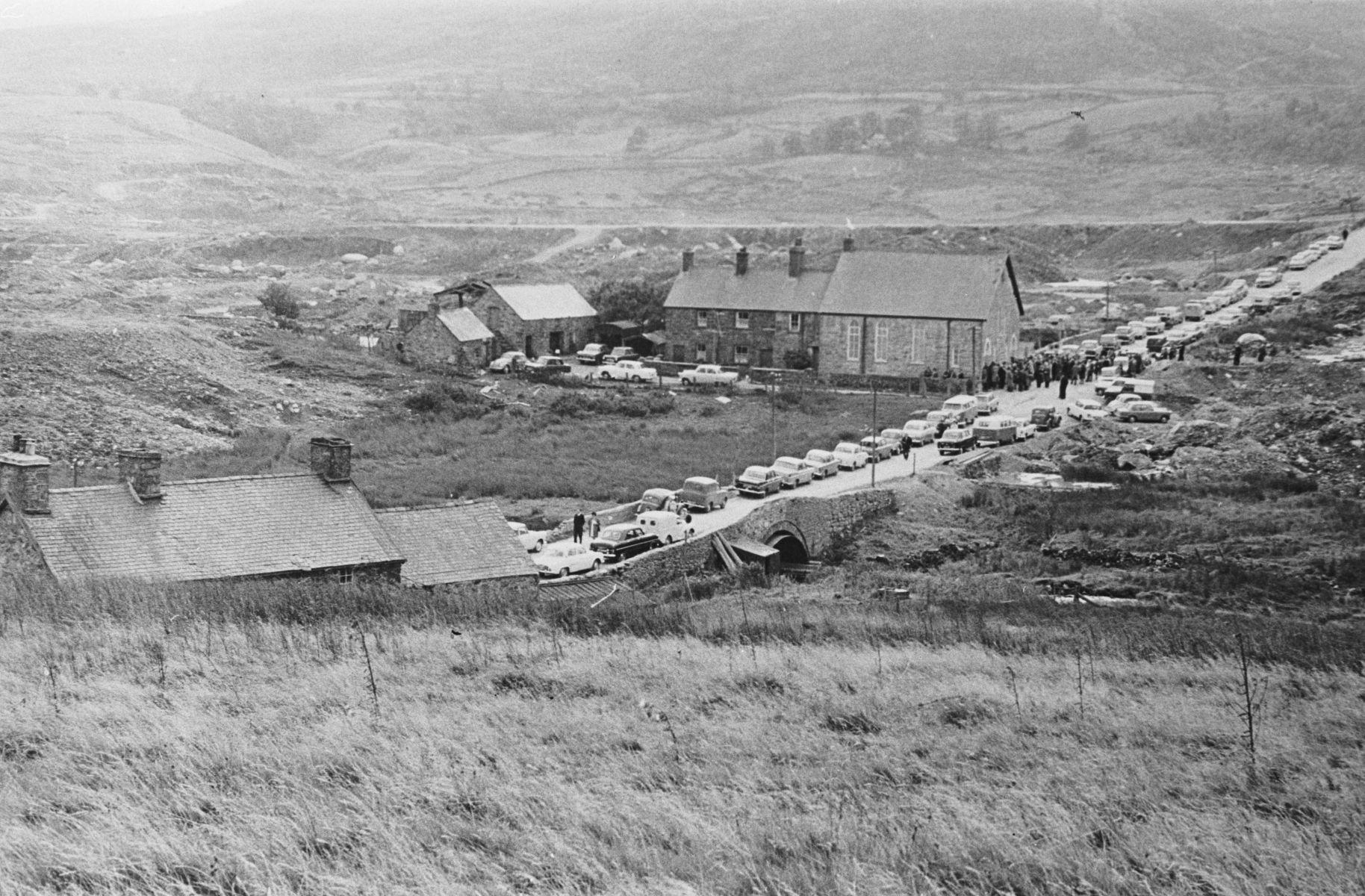
- 1963 photo of Capel Celyn

- Location within Gwynedd
- Community: Bala
- Principal area: Gwynedd
- Country: Wales
- Sovereign state: United Kingdom

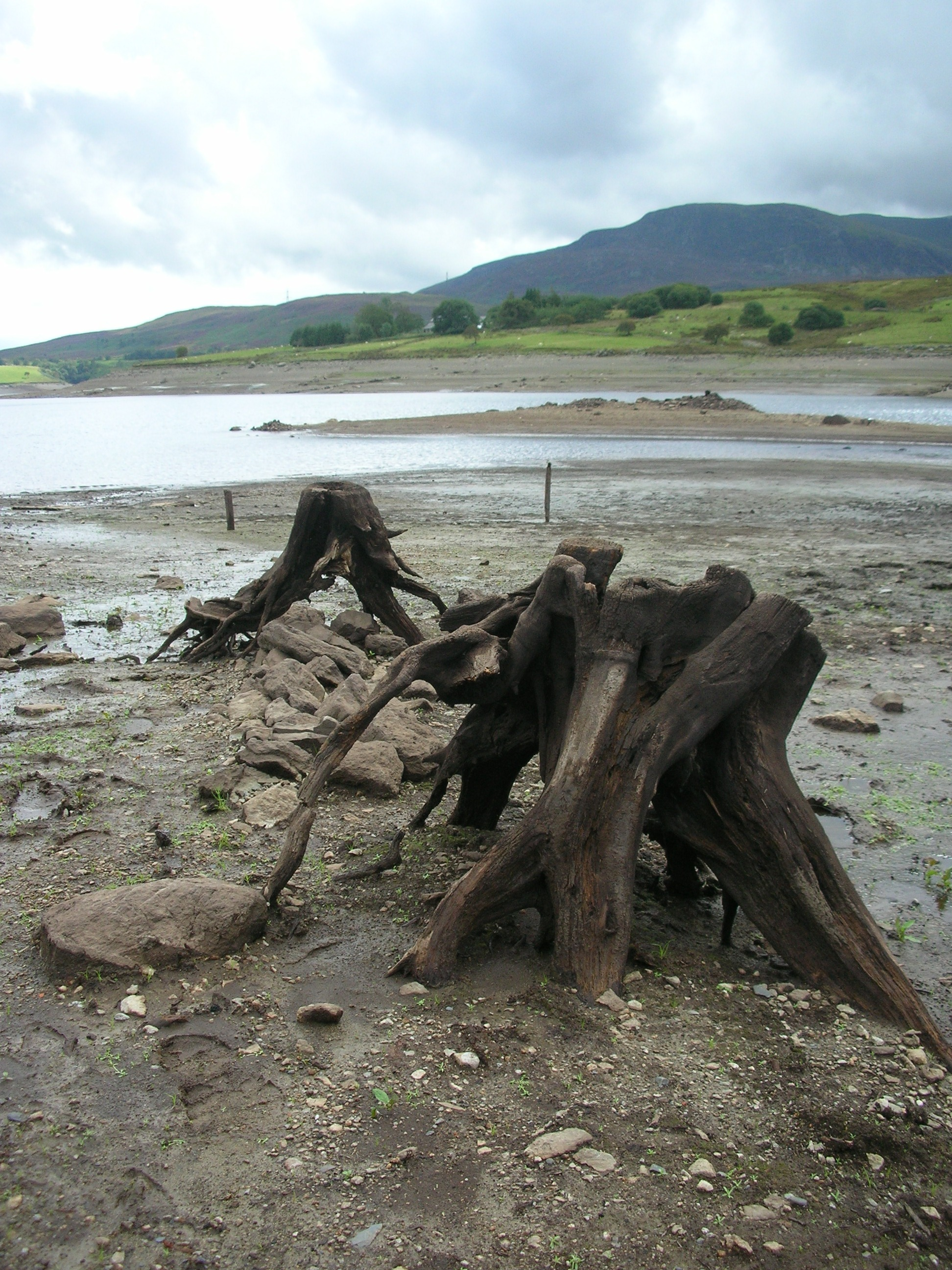
Tree stumps at Capel Celyn in 2006, exposed by low water level of reservoir

Capel Celyn was a rural community to the northwest of Bala in Merionethshire (now Gwynedd), Wales, in the Tryweryn valley. The village and other parts of the valley were flooded in the Tryweryn flooding of 1965 to create a reservoir, Llyn Celyn, in order to supply Liverpool and Wirral with water for industry. At the time the village was one of the few remaining Welsh-only speaking communities.

== Etymology ==
Capel is Welsh for chapel, while celyn is Welsh for holly.

== Flooding ==
The villagers first knew about the proposal a few days before Christmas 1955, from reading about it in the Welsh edition of the Liverpool Daily Post. The flooding of the village was controversial as Liverpool City Council did not require planning consent from the local Welsh authorities as the reservoir was approved via an Act of Parliament. As a consequence there was no public inquiry on the proposal.

The villagers created the Capel Celyn Defence Committee, which debated and denounced the scheme all over Wales through newspapers, radio and television. The villagers marched twice to Liverpool in 1956 to make their objections known. However, Liverpool councillors voted overwhelmingly to proceed.

When the valley was flooded in 1965, the village and its buildings, including the post office, the school, and a chapel with cemetery, were all lost. Twelve houses and farms were submerged, and 48 people of the 67 who lived in the valley lost their homes.

== Notable residents ==
- Elizabeth May Watkin Jones was born in Capel Celyn, where her family kept the local post office. She was one of the protest leaders together with Dafydd Roberts.
