= History of the Welsh language =

Development of Welsh language to present day

The history of the Welsh language (Welsh: hanes yr iaith Gymraeg) spans over 1400 years, encompassing the stages of the language known as Primitive Welsh, Old Welsh, Middle Welsh, and Modern Welsh.

== Origins ==
Welsh evolved from British (Common Brittonic), the Celtic language spoken by the ancient Britons. Alternatively classified as Insular Celtic or P-Celtic, it probably arrived in Britain during the Bronze Age or Iron Age and was probably spoken throughout the island south of the Firth of Forth. During the Early Middle Ages, the British language began to fragment due to increased dialect differentiation, evolving into Welsh and the other Brythonic languages (Breton, Cornish, and the extinct Cumbric). It is not clear when Welsh became distinct.

== Primitive Welsh (550–800) ==
Kenneth H. Jackson suggested that the evolution in syllabic structure and sound pattern was complete by around 550, and labelled the period between then and about 800 "Primitive Welsh". This Primitive Welsh may have been spoken in Wales, western England, and the Hen Ogledd ('Old North'), the Brythonic-speaking areas of what is now northern England and southern Scotland, and may therefore have been the ancestor of Cumbric as well as Welsh. Jackson, however, believed that the two varieties were already distinct by that time.

== Old Welsh (800–1150) ==
The Welsh language in documents predating around 1150. The earliest Welsh poetry – that attributed to the Cynfeirdd or 'Early Poets' – is generally considered to date to the Primitive Welsh period. However, much of this poetry was supposedly composed in the Hen Ogledd, raising further questions about the dating of the material and language in which it was originally composed.

== Middle Welsh (12th–14th centuries) ==
Middle Welsh (Cymraeg Canol) is the label attached to the Welsh of the 12th to 14th centuries, of which much more remains than for any earlier period. This is the language of nearly all surviving early manuscripts of the Mabinogion, although the tales themselves are certainly much older. It is also the language of the existing manuscripts of Welsh law. Middle Welsh is reasonably intelligible, albeit with some work, to a modern-day Welsh speaker.

The famous cleric Gerald of Wales tells the story of King Henry II of England. During one of the King's many raids in the 12th century, Henry asked an old man of Pencader, Carmarthenshire, whether he thought the Welsh language had any chance:

My Lord king, this nation may now be harassed, weakened and decimated by your soldiery, as it has so often been by others in former times; but it will never be totally destroyed by the wrath of man, unless at the same time it is punished by the wrath of God. Whatever else may come to pass, I do not think that on the Day of Direst Judgement any race other than the Welsh, or any other language, will give answer to the Supreme Judge of all for this small corner of the earth.

== Early Modern Welsh (1500–1588) ==
Modern Welsh can be divided into two periods. The first, Early Modern Welsh, ran from the early 15th century to roughly the end of the 16th century.

In the Early Modern Welsh Period use of the Welsh language began to be restricted, such as with the passing of Henry VIII's 1536 Act of Union. Through this Act Wales was governed solely under English law. Only 150 words of this Act were concerned with the use of the Welsh language. Section 20 of the Act banned the use of the language in court proceedings and those who solely spoke Welsh and did not speak English could not hold government office. Wales was to be represented by 26 members of parliament who spoke English. Outside certain areas in Wales such as South Pembrokeshire, the vast majority of those living in Wales did not speak English, meaning that interpreters were regularly needed in order to conduct hearings. Before passing the Act many gentry and government officials already spoke English; however, the Act codified the class ruling of the English language, with numbers who were fluent in English rising significantly after its passing. The Act's primary function was to create uniform control over the now united England and Wales; however, it laid a foundation for the superiority of classes through the use of language. Welsh was now seen as a language spoken by the lower working classes, with those from higher classes seen superior and given roles in government for choosing to speak English over Welsh. This part of the Act was not repealed until 1993 under the Welsh Language Act.

== Late Modern Welsh begins (1588) ==
Late Modern Welsh began with the publication of William Morgan's translation of the Bible in 1588. Like its English counterpart, the King James Version, this proved to have a strong stabilizing effect on the language, and indeed the language today still bears the same Late Modern label as Morgan's language. Of course, many changes have occurred since then.

Languages of Wales 1750–1900

1750

1800

1850

1900
Key: • Welsh • Bilingual • English

== 18th century ==
In the 18th century Wales experienced the Welsh Methodist revival, and the growth of nonconformist denominations in Wales. Methodism promoted the idea of personal and individual reading of the Bible and scriptures, and that every person should be able to read the Bible. Consequently this encouraged mass literacy in Wales, most prominently with Griffith Jones' circulating schools (Welsh: Ysgolion cylchynol), which were three month courses taught by Jones to teach people to read and which travelled around Wales. They taught children in the day and both men and women in the evenings. His efforts were funded primarily by Bridget Bevan, and the education was conducted entirely through the Welsh language which was the only language for the poorer people they were educating. By Griffith Jones’s death in 1761, a total of 3,495 Circulating Schools had been conducted all over Wales. These schools continued to circulate until 1771, by which time the schools had educated over 200,000 people, more than half the Welsh population at the time. This made Wales the country with the highest rate of literacy in the world at the time.

The success of these school attracted international attention, with the Russian Empress Catherine the Great commissioned a report on the schools with a view to creating a similar system in Russia.

William Williams Pantycelyn was another prominent figure of the Methodist revival, and he was most prominent for his Welsh language writings primarily his hymns, but he also wrote poetry and prose as well. His most well known hymn is "Arglwydd, arwain trwy'r anialwch" (English: "Lord, lead thou through the wilderness"). This was soon translated into English by Peter Williams as "Guide Me, O Thou Great Jehovah" or "Guide Me, O Thou Great Redeemer". It is usually sung to the tune Cwm Rhondda by John Hughes.

== 19th century ==
The 19th century was a critical period in the history of the language and one that encompassed many contradictions. In 1800 Welsh was the main spoken language of the vast majority of Wales, with the only exceptions being some border areas and other places which had seen significant settlement, such as south Pembrokeshire; by the 1901 census, this proportion had declined to a little over half of the population, though the large increase in the total population over the century (due to the effects of industrialisation and in-migration) meant that the total number of Welsh speakers grew throughout the 19th century, peaking in the 1911 census at over one million even as the proportion of the Welsh population that could speak Welsh fell below 50% for the first time.

Especially when compared to other stateless languages in Europe, Welsh boasted an extraordinarily active press, with poetry, religious writing, biography, translations, and, by the end of the century, novels all appearing in the language, as well as countless newspapers, journals and periodicals. An ongoing interest in antiquarianism ensured the dissemination of the language's medieval poetry and prose (such as the Mabinogion). A further development was the publication of some of the first complete and concise Welsh dictionaries. Early work by Welsh lexicographic pioneers such as Daniel Silvan Evans ensured that the language was documented as accurately as possible. Modern dictionaries such as Geiriadur Prifysgol Cymru (the University of Wales Dictionary) are direct descendants of these dictionaries.

Despite these outward signs of health, it was during the nineteenth century that English replaced Welsh as the most widely spoken language within the country. Wales, particularly the South Wales Coalfield, experienced significant population growth and in-migration (primarily from England and Ireland), which changed the linguistic profile of some areas (though other areas would remain Welsh-speaking despite the changes).

Learning English was enthusiastically encouraged; in contrast, Welsh was not taught or used as a medium of instruction in schools, many of which actively discouraged the use of Welsh using measures such as the Welsh Not. Welsh held no official recognition and had limited status under the British state. It did not become officially recognised as the language of Wales until the passing of the Welsh Language (Wales) Measure 2011. Welsh was increasingly restricted in scope to the non-conformist religious chapels, who would teach children to read and write in Sunday schools. Individuals such as Matthew Arnold championed the virtues of Welsh literature whilst simultaneously advocating the replacement of Welsh as the everyday language of the country with English, and many Welsh speakers themselves such as David Davies and John Ceiriog Hughes advocated bilingualism, if not necessarily the extinction of Welsh.

By the end of the nineteenth century, English came to prevail in the large cities of south-east Wales. Welsh remained strong in the north-west and in parts of mid-Wales and south-west Wales. Rural Wales was a stronghold of the Welsh language, and so also were the industrial slate-quarrying communities of Caernarfonshire and Merionethshire. Many of the nonconformist churches throughout Wales were strongly associated with the Welsh language.

The defacto Welsh national anthem, 'Hen Wlad fy Nhadau' was composed in January 1856. The words were written by Evan James and the tune composed by his son, James James, both residents of Pontypridd.

== 20th century ==
=== Early census findings ===
By the 20th century, the numbers of Welsh speakers were shrinking at a rate which suggested that the language would be extinct within a few generations.

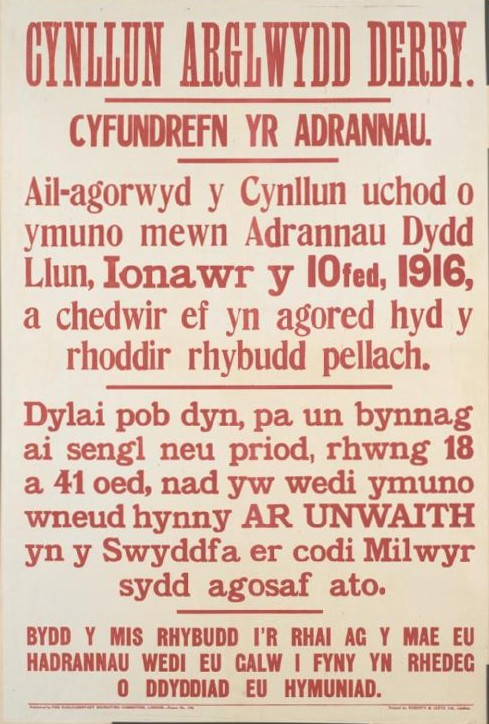
Welsh-language poster for the First World War-era Derby Scheme (1915)

According to the 1911 census, out of a population of just under 2.5 million, 43.5% of those aged three years and upwards in Wales and Monmouthshire spoke Welsh (8.5% monoglot Welsh speakers, 35% bilingual in English and Welsh). This was a decrease from the 1891 census with 49.9% speaking Welsh out of a population of 1.5 million (15.1% monoglot, 34.8% bilingual). The distribution of those speaking the language however was unevenly distributed with five counties remaining overwhelmingly and predominantly Welsh-speaking:

- Anglesey: 88.7% spoke Welsh while 61.0% spoke English
- Cardiganshire: 89.6% spoke Welsh while 64.1% could speak English
- Caernarfonshire: 85.6% spoke Welsh while 62.2% could speak English
- Carmarthenshire: 84.9% spoke Welsh while 77.8% could speak English
- Merionethshire: 90.3% spoke Welsh while 61.3% could speak English

Outside these five counties, a further two areas were noted as having a majority who spoke Welsh, those being:

- Denbighshire: 56.7% could speak Welsh while 88.3% could speak English
- Merthyr Tydfil County Borough 50.2% while 94.8% could speak English

=== 1921 census and the founding of Plaid Cymru ===
The 1921 census recorded that of the population of Wales (including Monmouthshire), 38.7% of the population could speak Welsh while 6.6% of the overall population were Welsh monoglots. In the five predominantly Welsh-speaking counties, Welsh was spoken by more than 75% of the population, and was more widely understood than English:

- Anglesey: 87.8% could speak Welsh while 67.9% could speak English
- Cardiganshire: 86.8% could speak Welsh, 72.4% could speak English
- Carmarthenshire: 84.5% could speak Welsh while 83.1% could speak English
- Merioneth: 84.3% could speak Welsh while 69.5% could speak English
- Carnarvonshire: 76.5% could speak Welsh while 73.3% could speak English

Denbighshire was the only other county where a majority could still speak Welsh; here, 51.0% could speak Welsh and 94.0% could speak English. As for larger urban areas, Aberdare was the only one where a majority could still speak Welsh, here 59.0% could speak Welsh while 95.4% could speak English. In Cardiff, Wales's largest city, 5.2% of people could speak Welsh, while 99.7% of people could speak English. At a district level, Llanfyrnach rural district in Pembrokeshire had the highest percentage of Welsh speakers at 97.5%, while Penllyn rural district in Merioneth had the highest percentage of Welsh monoglots, at 57.3%. Bethesda urban district in Caernarfonshire was the most Welsh-speaking urban district in Wales; 96.6% of the district's population could speak Welsh.

The Welsh nationalist party Plaid Genedlaethol Cymru ('the National Party of Wales'; later abbreviated to Plaid Cymru, 'the Party of Wales') was founded at a meeting in the 1925 National Eisteddfod in Pwllheli, Gwynedd, with the primary aim of promoting the Welsh language.

=== Tân yn Llŷn ===
Concern for the Welsh language was ignited in 1936 when the British government decided to build an RAF training camp and aerodrome at Penyberth on the Llŷn Peninsula in Gwynedd. The events surrounding the protest became known as Tân yn Llŷn ('Fire in Llŷn'). The government had settled on Llŷn as the location for this military site after plans for similar bases in the English counties of Northumberland and Dorset had met with protests. The prime minister Stanley Baldwin refused to hear the case against basing this RAF establishment in Wales, despite a deputation claiming to represent half a million Welsh protesters. The opposition against "British" military usage of this site in Wales was summed up by Saunders Lewis when he wrote that the government was intent upon turning one of the "essential homes of Welsh culture, idiom, and literature" into a place for promoting a barbaric method of warfare.

On 8 September 1936, the building was set on fire, and the Welsh nationalists Saunders Lewis, Lewis Valentine and D. J. Williams claimed responsibility for the arson. The case was tried at Caernarfon, where the jury failed to reach a verdict. It was then sent to the Old Bailey in London, where the "Three" were convicted and sentenced to nine months' imprisonment. On their release from Wormwood Scrubs they were greeted as heroes by a crowd of 15,000 people at a pavilion in Caernarfon.

=== Broadcasting in Welsh and the 1931 census ===
With the advent of broadcasting in Wales, Plaid Cymru protested against the lack of Welsh-language programming and launched a campaign to withhold licence fees. The pressure was successful, and by the mid-1930s more programmes in Welsh were broadcast, with the formal establishment of a Welsh regional broadcasting channel by 1937. However, no dedicated Welsh-language television channel would be established until 1982.

According to the 1931 census, out of a population of just over 2.5 million, the percentage of Welsh speakers in Wales had dropped to 36.8%, with Anglesey recording the highest concentration of speakers at 87.4%, followed by Cardigan at 87.1%, Merionethshire at 86.1%, and Carmarthen at 82.3%. Caernarfon listed 79.2%. Radnorshire and Monmouthshire ranked lowest with a concentration of Welsh speakers less than 6% of the population.

=== First Welsh-medium schools ===
The first Welsh-medium primary school was established in Aberystwyth in 1939 by Ifan ab Owen Edwards. Originally a private school named Ysgol Gymraeg yr Urdd composed of only seven children, it later became Ysgol Gymraeg Aberystwyth and now teaches over 400 children. Ysgol Glan Clwyd was opened in 1956 with 94 pupils in Rhyl, becoming the first secondary school with a formal remit to teach through the medium of Welsh. It moved to St Asaph in 1969. In 1949 Cardiff gained its first Welsh medium primary school, Ysgol Gymraeg Caerdydd, renamed Ysgol Bryntaf and moved to Llandaf in 1952. In 1978 Ysgol Glantaf opened, Cardiff's first Welsh-medium secondary school. In 1962 Rhydfelen secondary school was founded, the first Welsh medium secondary school in South Wales (later Ysgol Garth Olwg).

=== Welsh Courts Act 1942 ===
The Welsh Courts Act was passed in 1942, repealing Henry VIII's earlier laws; this finally permitted limited use of the Welsh language in courts of law.

=== Tynged yr Iaith and the 1961 census ===
In 1962 Saunders Lewis gave a radio speech entitled Tynged yr Iaith ('The Fate of the Language'), in which he predicted the extinction of the Welsh language unless direct action was taken. Lewis was responding to the 1961 census, which showed a decrease in the number of Welsh speakers from 36% in 1931 to 26% in 1961, out of a population of about 2.5 million. Meirionnydd, Anglesey, Carmarthen, and Caernarfon averaged a 75% concentration of Welsh speakers, but the most significant decrease was in the counties of Glamorgan, Flint, and Pembroke.

Lewis's intent was to motivate Plaid Cymru to take more direct action to promote the language; however, it led to the formation of Cymdeithas yr Iaith Gymraeg (the Welsh Language Society) later that year at a Plaid Cymru summer school held in Pontardawe in Glamorgan.

=== Flooding of the Tryweryn valley ===
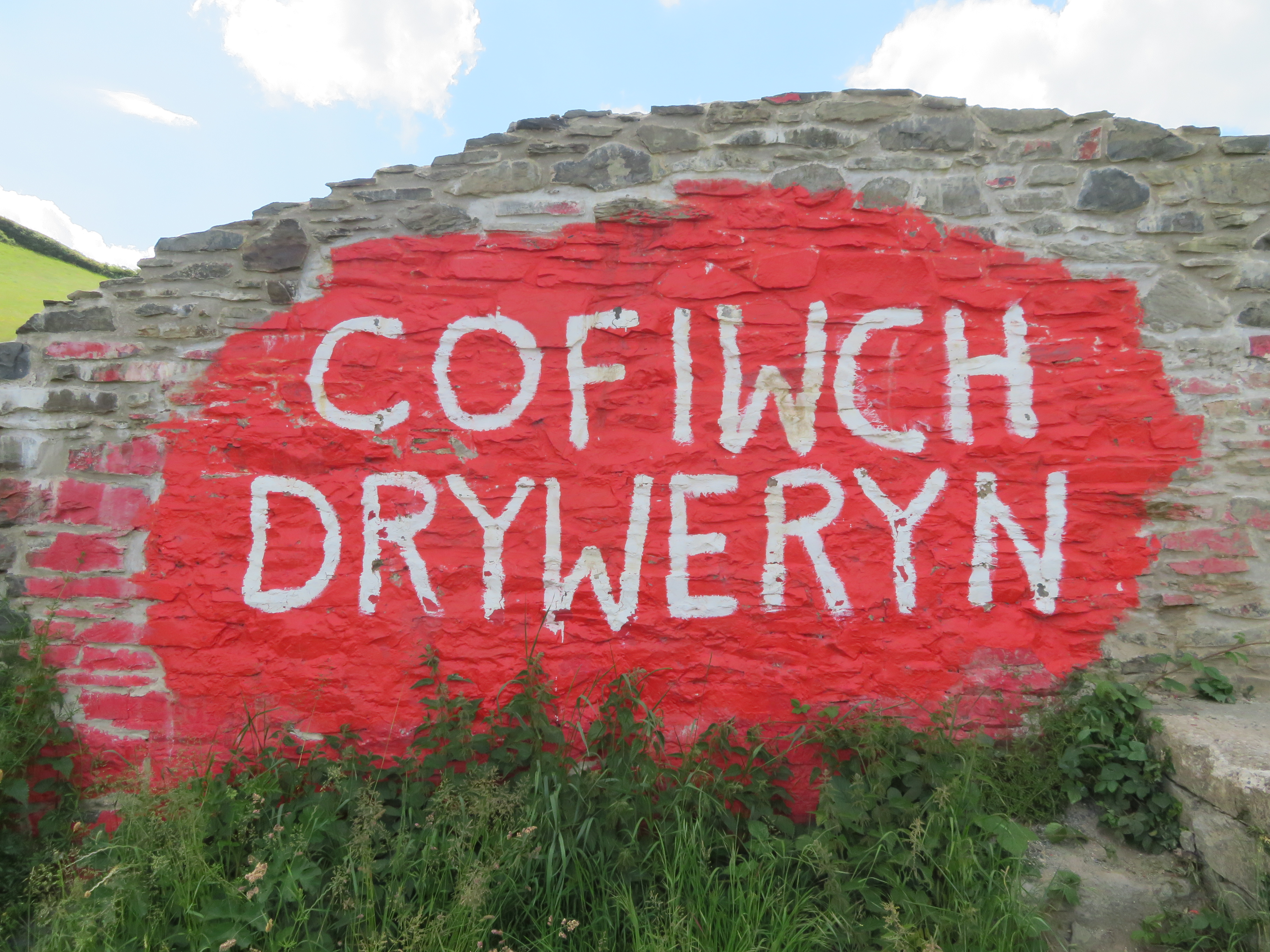
Cofiwch Dryweryn graffiti at Llanrhystud, Ceredigion, on the site of the slogan's first appearance

In 1965 the village of Capel Celyn was drowned in the Tryweryn valley. This created tension between natural resources provision and the protection of cultural identity. This event is commemorated in Wales with the graffitied slogan Cofiwch Dryweryn ('Remember Tryweryn'). The flooding of Tryweryn continues to influence debates on forced removal even today. Songs and poems also pay tribute to the loss and shame of the event.

=== Last of the Welsh monoglots ===
In a 1968 newspaper report the existence of a small number of elderly Welsh monoglots in the Llŷn Peninsula of North Wales was described.

=== Influence of Gwynfor Evans ===
The leader of Plaid Cymru, Gwynfor Evans, won the party's first ever Parliamentary seat in Carmarthen in 1966, which "helped change the course of a nation". This, paired with the Scottish National Party's Winnie Ewing's winning a seat in 1967, may have contributed to pressure on the Labour prime minister Harold Wilson to form the Kilbrandon Commission. This event may have also contributed to the passing of the Welsh Language Act 1967. The act repealed a provision in the Wales and Berwick Act 1746 that the term "England" should include Wales, thus defining Wales to be a separate entity from England within the United Kingdom. The act allowed the use of Welsh alongside English in courts of law in Wales, partly based on the Hughes Parry Report.

Following the defeat of the "Yes Campaign" for a Welsh Assembly in 1979, and believing Welsh nationalism to be "in a paralysis of helplessness", the Conservative Home Secretary announced in September 1979 that the government would not honour its pledge to establish a Welsh-language television channel, much to widespread anger and resentment in Wales.

In early 1980 over two thousand members of Plaid Cymru pledged to go to prison rather than pay the television licence fees, and by that spring Gwynfor Evans announced his intention to go on hunger strike if a Welsh-language television channel was not established. In early September 1980, Evans addressed thousands at a gathering in which "passions ran high", according to the historian John Davies. The government yielded by 17 September, and the Welsh Fourth Channel (S4C) was launched on 2 November 1982.

=== Welsh Language Act 1993 ===
The Welsh Language Act 1993 provided a new law for public organisations in Wales to have bilingual schemes, which would be supervised by the Welsh Language Board. Some private sector companies, including British Telecom and British Gas, had already included Welsh-language schemes in company policies before this Act.

== 21st century ==
=== Plaid Cymru ===
In a speech at the 2000 National Eisteddfod at Llanelli, the Plaid Cymru Assembly Member Cynog Dafis called for a new Welsh-language movement with greater powers to lobby for the language at the Assembly, UK, and EU levels. Dafis felt the needs of the Welsh language were ignored during the first year of the Assembly, and that to ensure the language's dynamic growth a properly resourced strategy was needed. In his speech Dafis encouraged other Welsh-language advocacy groups to work more closely together to create a more favourable climate in which the use of Welsh was "attractive, exciting, a source of pride and a sign of strength". Additionally, Dafis pointed towards efforts in areas such as Catalonia and the Basque Country as successful examples to emulate.

Lord Elis-Thomas, the former president of Plaid Cymru, disagreed with Dafis's assessment, however. At the Urdd Eisteddfod, Elis-Thomas said that there was no need for another Welsh language act, citing that there was "enough goodwill to safeguard the language's future". His comments prompted Cymdeithas yr Iaith Gymraeg and many others to call for his resignation as the Assembly's presiding officer.

=== Census data ===
In the 1991 census, the Welsh language stabilised at the 1981 level of 18.7%.

According to the 2001 census, the number of Welsh speakers in Wales increased for the first time in over 100 years, with 20.8% in a population of over 2.9 million claiming fluency in Welsh. Further, 28% of the population of Wales claimed to understand Welsh. The census revealed that the increase was most significant in urban areas, such as Cardiff with an increase from 6.6% in 1991 to 10.9% in 2001, and Rhondda Cynon Taf with an increase from 9% in 1991 to 12.3% in 2001. However, the number of Welsh speakers declined in Gwynedd from 72.1% in 1991 to 68.7%, and in Ceredigion from 59.1% in 1991 to 51.8%. Ceredigion, in particular, experienced the greatest fluctuation with a 19.5% influx of new residents since 1991.

The 2011 census government speaker targets (a 5% increase) were missed and the proportion of Welsh speakers decreased, causing much concern, from 21% in 2001 to 19% in 2011.

For October 2020 to 30 September 2021, the Annual Population Survey showed that 29.5% of people aged three or older were able to speak Welsh, which equates to approximately 892,500 people. However, when the results of the 2021 census were published, they showed a further decrease to 17.8%, equating to 538,000 speakers.

=== Second-home crisis ===
The decline in Welsh speakers in Gwynedd and Anglesey (Ynys Môn) may be attributable to non–Welsh-speaking people moving to North Wales, driving up property prices to levels that local Welsh speakers cannot afford, according to Seimon Glyn, a former Gwynedd county councillor with Plaid Cymru. Glyn was commenting on a report underscoring the dilemma of rocketing house prices outstripping what locals could pay, with the report warning that "traditional Welsh communities could die out" as a consequence.

Much of the rural Welsh property market was driven by buyers looking for second homes for use as holiday homes or for retirement. Many buyers were drawn to Wales from England because of relatively inexpensive house prices in Wales as compared to those in England. The rise in house prices outpaced the average earned income in Wales and meant that many local people could not afford to purchase their first home or compete with second-home buyers.

In 2001 nearly a third of all properties sold in Gwynedd were bought by buyers from out of the county, and some communities reported as many as a third of local homes used as holiday homes. Holiday homeowners spend less than six months of the year in the local community.

The issue of locals being priced out of the local housing market is common to many rural communities throughout the United Kingdom, but in Wales, the added dimension of language further complicates the issue, as many new residents do not learn the Welsh language.

Concern for the Welsh language under these pressures prompted Glyn to say "Once you have more than 50% of anybody living in a community that speaks a foreign language, then you lose your indigenous tongue almost immediately".

Plaid Cymru had long advocated controls on second homes, and a 2001 task force headed by Dafydd Wigley recommended that land should be allocated for affordable local housing, called for grants for locals to buy houses, and recommended that council tax on holiday homes should double, following similar measures in the Scottish Highlands.

However, the Welsh Labour–Liberal Democrat Assembly coalition rebuffed these proposals, with the Assembly housing spokesman Peter Black stating that "we [cannot] frame our planning laws around the Welsh language", adding "Nor can we take punitive measures against second homeowners in the way that they propose as these will have an impact on the value of the homes of local people".

In contrast, by autumn 2001 the Exmoor National Park authority in England began to consider limiting second home ownership there, which was also driving up local housing prices by as much as 31%. Elfyn Llwyd, Plaid Cymru's Parliamentary Group Leader, said that the issues in Exmoor National Park were the same as those in Wales, however, in Wales, there is the added dimension of language and culture. Reflecting on the controversy Glyn's comments caused earlier in the year, Llwyd observed "What is interesting is, of course, it is fine for Exmoor to defend their community but in Wales when you try to say these things it is called racist". Llwyd called on other parties to join in a debate to bring the Exmoor experience to Wales when he said "I really do ask them and I plead with them to come around the table and talk about the Exmoor suggestion and see if we can now bring it into Wales".

By spring 2002 both the Snowdonia National Park (Welsh: Parc Cenedlaethol Eryri) and Pembrokeshire Coast National Park (Welsh: Parc Cenedlaethol Arfordir Penfro) authorities began limiting second home ownership within the parks, following the example set by Exmoor. According to planners in Snowdonia and the Pembrokeshire Coast, applicants for new homes must demonstrate a proven local need or that the applicant had strong links with the area.

=== Granting of official status ===
The Welsh Language (Wales) Measure 2011 modernised the 1993 Welsh Language Act and gave Welsh an official status in Wales for the first time, a major landmark for the language. Welsh is the only official de jure language of any country in the UK. The Measure was also responsible for creating the post of Welsh Language Commissioner, replacing the Welsh Language Board. Following the referendum in 2011, the Official Languages Act became the first Welsh law to be created in 600 years, according to the First Minister at the time, Carwyn Jones. This law was passed by Welsh Assembly members only and made Welsh an official language of the National Assembly.

=== Negative attitudes in the English media ===
Despite recent progress in recognising the Welsh language, celebrating its use and making it equal to the English language, prejudice still exists towards its use. Many still view it as a working-class language. As the Welsh language is closely tied with Wales's intangible cultural heritage, the Welsh as a people have been targeted. Rod Liddle in The Spectator in 2010 stated that the Welsh are "miserable, seaweed munching, sheep-bothering pinch-faced hill-tribes". In 2018, the same writer mocked the Welsh language in The Sunday Times after the renaming of the Severn crossing: "They would prefer it to be called something indecipherable with no real vowels, such as Ysgythysgymlngwchgwch Bryggy". A Welsh Member of Parliament for Dwyfor Meirionnydd Liz Saville Roberts expressed these concerns that the Welsh are still seen as lower-class citizens. She condemns Liddle's actions to BBC News, to go "out of his way, effectively, to mock Wales, he calls it poor compared to England and mocks that, and then goes on to mock our language". However, this is not the first time this opinion has been shared. In 1997, A. A. Gill expressed the same negative opinion of the Welsh, further describing them as "loquacious, dissemblers, immoral liars, stunted, bigoted, dark, ugly, pugnacious little trolls."

This sentiment has also been held by the TV presenters Anne Robinson and Jeremy Clarkson. Anne Robinson, referring to the Welsh, asked "what are they for?" and that she "never did like them" on the popular comedy programme Room 101 in 2001, at the time hosted by Paul Merton. The controversial ex–BBC presenter Jeremy Clarkson is infamous for his discriminatory remarks against the Welsh people and their language. In 2011, Clarkson expressed his opinion in his column in The Sun that "We are fast approaching the time when the United Nations should start to think seriously about abolishing other languages. What's the point of Welsh for example? All it does is provide a silly maypole around which a bunch of hotheads can get all nationalistic".
