= English–Welsh cultural relations =

Cultural interactions between the English and the Welsh

Map of England (red) and Wales (green)

The cultural relationship between the English and the Welsh manifests through many shared cultural elements including language, sport, religion and food. The cultural relationship is usually characterised by tolerance of people and cultures, although some mutual mistrust and racism or xenophobia persists. Hatred or fear of the Welsh by the English has been termed "Cymrophobia", and similar attitudes towards the English by the Welsh, or others, are termed "Anglophobia".

The relationship has developed historically from the origins of the two nations, and has been shaped by the military, political, economic and cultural power exercised by the more populous English over the Welsh for many centuries; differences between the English and Welsh languages; and the cultural importance attached by people in Wales to features of their national identity including the language, literature, religion, history, traditions, and the national sport of rugby union.

The Anglo-Norman kings of England had conquered Wales militarily by the 13th century, and under Henry VIII the country was incorporated into the Kingdom of England by the Laws in Wales Acts in the 16th century. Many elements of the Welsh economy and society since then have been shaped by demands from England, and Wales has been described as "England's first colony". However, Welsh identity remained strong, and recently there has been an increasing awareness and acknowledgement of Wales' cultural and historical separateness from England, which is reflected politically.

The Welsh language is in the Insular Celtic language group, whereas English is in the West Germanic language group; consequently the English language is further from the Welsh language in both vocabulary and grammar than from a number of European languages, such as Dutch, for example.

== Historical background ==
=== Celt and Saxon ===
The Britons (Britanni) were the native inhabitants of Roman Britain, and spoke the Common Brittonic language, one of the Insular Celtic languages which evolved into Welsh, Cornish, Cumbric and Breton. By the time the Roman legions left in the early 5th century, the Britons (Brythons) had started to come under attack, leading to mass migrations of Angles, Jutes, Saxons and other Germanic peoples from the European mainland, who set up their own kingdoms and settled in what became England.

The native Britons established independent kingdoms such as Gwynedd, Powys, Gwent, and (under Irish influence) Dyfed in the more mountainous and remote west. The Battle of Chester in 616, won by the Angles of Northumbria, contributed to the isolation of what became Wales. Around 730, the English historian Bede described the Britons as "for the most part, through innate hatred... adverse to the English nation." By that time, the Saxons had full control of Wessex and Mercia. Mercia, in particular, came into conflict with Powys, and Offa's Dyke was built around 790 by the Mercian king Offa to create an effective barrier against incursions from the neighbouring Welsh kingdoms.

By the 11th century, if not earlier, Wales – with its own distinct legal system, though only intermittently unified as a political entity – had developed a national identity as Cymru, or "Land of the compatriots" (Cymry), in contrast to the Saeson or Saxons. In England, the Anglo-Saxon language had long supplanted the old Brittonic languages, and the English words "Wales" and "Welsh", meaning "foreigners", came to be used to describe the free lands to the west.

=== Anglo-Norman conquest ===
If any of the gild slay a man, and he be an avenger by compulsion and compensate for his violence, and the slain man be a twelfhynde man, let each of the gild give half a mark for his aid: if the slain man be a Ceorl, two oras. If he be Welsh, one ora.

— The terms of the Gild regulations of the Gild of the Thanes at Grantabrycge

After William of Normandy's conquest of England in 1066, responsibility for oppressing the Welsh passed to Marcher Lords in the border areas. Gwynedd and Powys initially remained independent, but were gradually subjugated under the technical overlordship of the kings of England. The writings of Giraldus Cambrensis, setting out both positive and negative aspects of what he saw as the Welsh character, date from around this time. Llywelyn ap Gruffudd, building on the policy of his grandfather Llywelyn the Great, had his title of Prince of Wales accepted by the English crown in 1267.

Following Edward I's invasion in 1282, the Statute of Rhuddlan annexed Llywelyn's Principality of Wales – but not the whole country – to the kingdom of England, and the Welsh longbowmen became one of the numerous groups of foreign mercenaries serving with the English army. English settlers were sent to live in the newly created borough towns which developed in the shadow of Edward I's castles, particularly in the south and east. Over the next few centuries, the English dominated these garrison towns, from which the native Welsh were officially excluded. The settlers called themselves "the English burgesses of the English boroughs of Wales" and proclaimed that the new towns had been raised "for the habitation of Englishmen", excluding "mere Welshmen" from their privileges on the grounds that they were "foreigners" in the implanted boroughs. As historian R. R. Davies notes:

"Nowhere was the spirit of conquest and of racial superiority so vigorously and selfishly kept alive as in the English boroughs. It was little wonder that they were the most consistent target of Welsh resentment throughout the fourteenth century".

They imposed an English legal system, and the Welsh were not allowed to hold office in the government or church. Owain Glyndŵr's rebellion in the early 15th century was the last armed rebellion of the Welsh against the English. Anti-Welsh riots were reported in Oxford and London, and Parliament imposed more repressive measures on Wales.

=== The Tudors and the early modern period ===
In 1485, Henry Tudor, who was of Welsh descent, gained the English throne as King Henry VII, thanks largely to the support of the Welsh who hoped he was the Mab Darogan who would restore Britain to the Britons. However, this led to the cementing of Wales into the English administrative and legal system under his son, Henry VIII. The Laws in Wales Acts of 1535–1542 annexed Wales to England, abolished the Welsh legal system, and banned the Welsh language from any official role and status. It also allowed members representing Wales to be elected to Parliament for the first time, although these were often not Welsh. The second of the Acts of Union (1542) established the Court of Great Sessions to deal with major misdemeanours in Wales: of the 217 judges who sat on its benches in its 288 years of existence, only 30 were Welshmen and it is unlikely that more than a handful of the latter – members of the higher gentry – actually spoke Welsh.

Gradually, the Welsh language – which remained the language of the overwhelming majority of the Welsh – regained some of the ground it had lost. There were translations of the full Bible into Welsh by 1600, and over the next two centuries there was a steady growth of education in the Welsh language, and the revival of traditions such as the eisteddfod. The attitude towards the Welsh language in England was hostile. A flood of anti-Welsh pamphlets were printed in the 17th century, such as Wallography by William Richards (1682), which wishes the speedy demise of the Welsh language:

The native gibberish is usually prattled throughout the whole of Taphydom except in their market towns, whose inhabitants being a little raised do begin to despise it. 'Tis usually cashiered out of gentlemen's houses ... so that (if the stars prove lucky) there may be some glimmering hopes that the British language may be quite extinct and may be Englished out of Wales.

Distinct democratic and religious movements also began to develop in Wales. However, legislation in 1746 introduced the legislative notion that, in all future laws, references to "England" would by default include Wales.

The nursery rhyme "Taffy was a Welshman" was first published around 1780, and seems to have been particularly popular in the English counties that bordered Wales. The name "Taffy" for any Welshman may derive either from the name Dafydd, or from the River Taff which flows through Cardiff.

=== Industrial Revolution ===
The development of 19th-century Anglo-Saxonism led to theories of English and Scottish racial and cultural superiority that described the Welsh as racially inferior. Around the same time, English and Scottish industrialists began establishing iron works and other heavy industry in the coalfield of south Wales. By attracting labour from the rural areas, this produced new urban concentrations of Welsh speakers, and helped build the culture of the South Wales Valleys communities. The Merthyr Rising of 1831 was a protest against exploitation by the mine owners which began a period of unrest, including the "Rebecca Riots" and the Chartist movement, and a process of radical thinking. In Parliament, Lord Melbourne declared that south Wales was "the worst and most formidable district in the kingdom." The concerns of the British political establishment were confirmed in the 1847 Reports of the Commissioners of Inquiry into the State of Education in Wales, commonly known in Wales as the Treason of the Blue Books, which, based on evidence taken in towns and villages around Wales, said that "The Welsh language is a vast drawback to Wales and a manifold barrier to the moral progress and commercial prosperity of the people. It is not easy to over-estimate its evil effects." The report's 3 commissioners were English, and spoke no Welsh, but relied on an army of Welsh-speaking assistant commissioners to collect evidence from the Welsh population, around half of which spoke no English at the time. As a result, English-only schools were set up in much of Wales, and, although use of the "Welsh Not" was virtually unknown by then, there were some reports that it continued to be used in a few places.

Although 18th and 19th century English writers increasingly recognised the beauty and grandeur of the Welsh landscape, many contrasted this with a negative view of the Welsh people themselves. For example, The Times newspaper wrote in 1866: "Wales... is a small country, unfavourably situated for commercial purposes, with an indifferent soil, and inhabited by an unenterprising people. It is true it possesses valuable minerals but these have chiefly been developed by English energy and for the supply of English wants." At the same time, rural areas close to England became more depopulated and anglicised, as many people moved to the growing English cities in the north west and Midlands. Welsh culture was important in these areas; for example, the National Eisteddfod of Wales was held in either Liverpool or Birkenhead six times between 1884 and 1929.

Changes to the electoral system meant that, by the end of the 19th century, a Welsh presence began to be felt in British politics. The Sunday Closing (Wales) Act 1881 (44 & 45 Vict. c. 61) was the first piece of parliamentary legislation that granted Wales the status of a distinct national unit. Around the turn of the 20th century there was considerable anti-Welsh feeling in the English establishment. Prime Minister of the United Kingdom H. H. Asquith said in 1905 "I would sooner go to hell than to Wales." One of Evelyn Waugh's characters in the novel Decline and Fall (1928) was made to say: "From the earliest times the Welsh have been looked upon as an unclean people. It is thus that they have preserved their racial integrity. Their sons and daughters rarely mate with human-kind except their own blood relations..... I often think that we can trace almost all the disasters of English history to the influence of Wales."

=== 20th century ===
In the early 20th century, Welsh politicians such as David Lloyd George (prime minister from 1916 to 1922), and later Aneurin Bevan (architect of the NHS) rose to UK-wide prominence.

The powerlessness of Welsh politicians in influencing their own affairs, due to the English numerical superiority in Parliament, was highlighted in the mid-20th century. Liverpool City Council had decided to expand the industry of Liverpool and The Wirral. Believing that they would need access to an increased water supply, they chose the Tryweryn Valley, near Bala, even though the development would require flooding the village of Capel Celyn. In 1956, a private bill sponsored by Liverpool City Council was brought before Parliament to create Llyn Celyn reservoir, thus circumventing planning consent from the relevant Welsh local authorities, by obtaining authority via an act of Parliament, the Liverpool Corporation Act 1957 (5 & 6 Eliz. 2. c. xlii).

Despite 35 of the 36 Welsh Members of Parliament (MPs) voting against the bill, with the other abstaining, Parliament – with 630 MPs, the majority of members represented constituencies in England – still passed the bill. Years of democratic, non-violent Welsh protest were in vain, Capel Celyn was drowned, and a new wave of Welsh nationalism, including the Mudiad Amddiffyn Cymru (English: Welsh Defence Movement) and the Free Wales Army, were born.

The Welsh Language Acts of 1967 and 1993 gave the language equal status in Wales, and in 1997 the Welsh electorate voted to establish a Welsh assembly, known as the Senedd since 2019.

== Recent comments ==
=== Anti-Welsh sentiment ===
Examples of anti-Welsh sentiment in the media include the journalist A. A. Gill (born in Scotland to English parents) who in The Sunday Times in 1997 described the Welsh as "loquacious, dissemblers, immoral liars, stunted, bigoted, dark, ugly, pugnacious little trolls." The English writer A. N. Wilson said: "The Welsh have never made any significant contribution to any branch of knowledge, culture or entertainment. They have no architecture, no gastronomic tradition, and, since the Middle Ages, no literature worthy of the name." (Evening Standard, 1993.)

In 2015, During a discussion in the House of Lords, Conservative peer Lady Williams used the term "welched" to describe a situation, she was questioned by Labour peer, Lord Morris at the time to define the word. She was unaware that the word has derogatory connotations linked to an offensive stereotype about Welsh people. She later acknowledged her lack of awareness regarding the term's origins and apologised for any unintended offense caused.

In 2000, a cross-party group of Members of the National Assembly for Wales, representing all four political parties in the Assembly, called for an end to what they termed "persistent anti-Welsh racism" in the British media.

Television personality Anne Robinson (born in England of Irish origin) appeared on the comedy show Room 101 in 2001 and made derisive comments about Welsh people, such as "what are they for?" and "I never did like them". The show is designed to draw extreme views from interview subjects in order to generate controversy and humour. The people she was thinking about were supposedly those who spoke Welsh around the market stall operated by her mother in Liverpool during her childhood. North Wales Police spent 96 hours investigating the comments, and concluded that no crime had been committed. Although she was cleared by the Broadcasting Standards Commission, it was stated that her comments "came close to bordering on racism." The North Wales Police have also investigated allegations of anti-Welsh racism made against Tony Blair and columnist Cristina Odone. Again, no charges were brought.

Writer Neal Ascherson commented that: "Southern views of the Scots over the last hundred years have been faintly sceptical – "chippy, lacking in humour, slow to unbend" – but on the whole affectionate. (Contrast English attitudes to Welshness, which, for reasons I am not sure of, are often genuinely hostile)."

Former BBC presenter Jeremy Clarkson is well known for his comments about other countries and regularly expresses anti-Welsh prejudice, e.g. "It's entirely unfair that some people are born fat or ugly or dyslexic or disabled or ginger or small or Welsh. Life, I'm afraid, is tragic." Another example, in the context of Wales's 2008 Grand Slam victory: "You can never rely on the French. All they had to do was go to Cardiff last weekend with a bit of fire in their bellies and they'd have denied Wales the Six Nations Grand Slam. But no. They turned up instead with cheese in their bellies and mooched about for 80 minutes, seemingly not at all bothered that we've got to spend the next 12 months listening to the sheepsters droning on about their natural superiority and brilliance. Or worse. Give them a Grand Slam and the next thing you know, all our holiday cottages are on fire. There are, of course, other reasons I hoped the French would win. I’d rather live in France than Wales; I’d rather eat a snail than a daffodil; I’d certainly rather drink French fizzy wine; and I’d much rather sleep with Carole Bouquet than Charlotte Church." On his BBC2 show he placed a plastic map of Wales in a microwave and burned it to audience applause. On 4 September 2011, in his weekend column for The Sun newspaper, Clarkson said "I think we are fast approaching the time when the United Nations should start to think seriously about abolishing other languages. What’s the point of Welsh for example? All it does is provide a silly maypole around which a bunch of hotheads can get all nationalistic."

In October 2010, Rod Liddle, in The Spectator magazine, described Welsh people as "miserable, seaweed munching, sheep-bothering pinch-faced hill-tribes" while calling for the closure of S4C as part of the 2010 Comprehensive Spending Review.

=== Anti-English sentiment ===
Concerns over the decline of the Welsh language and its historical proscription have contributed to anti-English sentiment in Wales. Other factors include sporting rivalry, particularly over rugby; religious differences concerning nonconformism and English episcopacy; industrial disputes which usually involved English capital and Welsh labour; resentment over the conquest and subjection of Wales; and the exploitation of Wales' natural resources such as coal and water. In 1977, Welsh rugby player Phil Bennett is reputed to have inspired his teammates for the Wales v England game with a pre-match speech: "Look what these bastards have done to Wales. They've taken our coal, our water, our steel. They buy our homes and only live in them for a fortnight every year. What have they given us? Absolutely nothing. We've been exploited, raped, controlled and punished by the English – and that's who you are playing this afternoon."

Llew Smith then Labour MP for Blaenau Gwent, gave a Commons speech critical of Welsh nationalism claiming (for example) that Nationalists resisted evacuation of children from English cities during WWII. HM Prison Parc reported problems with anti-English racism, as well as racism towards other ethnic groups. In 2000, The Chairman of Swansea Bay Race Equality Council said that 'Devolution has brought a definite increase in anti-English behaviour'.

English immigration to Wales is another point of contention. From 1979 to 1994, the Welsh militant group Meibion Glyndŵr (English: Sons of (Owain) Glyndŵr) firebombed 300 English-owned homes in Wales. In 1989, the group attempted arson against several estate agents in Wales and England, and against the offices of the Conservative Party in London. A Welsh businessman, and former chair of the Welsh Language Board, John Elfed Jones, characterised English migration as the human version of foot-and-mouth disease. Author Simon Brooks recommended that English-owned homes in Wales be 'peacefully occupied'. The vice-president of Plaid Cymru, Gwilym ab Ioan, was forced to resign when he said that Wales had become a "dumping ground for oddballs, social misfits and society drop-outs" from England. Both comments were reported to the Commission for Racial Equality although the cases were dropped after an apology by John Elfed Jones, but not Gwilym ab Ioan - who never offered any apology and maintains to the present that his comments were factually true and irrefutable. A Plaid Cymru county councillor, Seimon Glyn was criticised as anti-English when he said that English migration to Wales ought to be controlled, and that English incomers ought to be required to learn and speak Welsh. BNP leader Nick Griffin was accused of playing on concerns over the decline of Welsh when his party aired a Welsh-language broadcast which tied racism towards ethnic minority immigrants to Wales with racism towards English-speaking incomers to Wales. In response to this Dafydd Elis-Thomas, a former leader of Plaid Cymru, said that there was an anti-English strand to Welsh nationalism. His remarks were condemned by the Welsh Language Society and others.

== See also ==
- England–Wales border
- England and Wales
- Xenophobia
