= Welsh Language Act =

Welsh Language Act or Welsh Language Measure refers to different primary legislation:

- Welsh Language Act 1967 (c. 66), which extended the Welsh Courts Act 1942, restoring some rights for the official use of Welsh that had been removed in the 16th century
- Welsh Language Act 1993 (c. 38), which put Welsh on an equal footage to English for all public sector use
- Welsh Language (Wales) Measure 2011 (nawm 1)
- Welsh Language and Education (Wales) Act 2025 (asc 2)

== See also ==
- Welsh Courts Act 1942
- National Assembly for Wales (Official Languages) Act 2012
