= Modern history of Wales =

Aspect of Welsh history

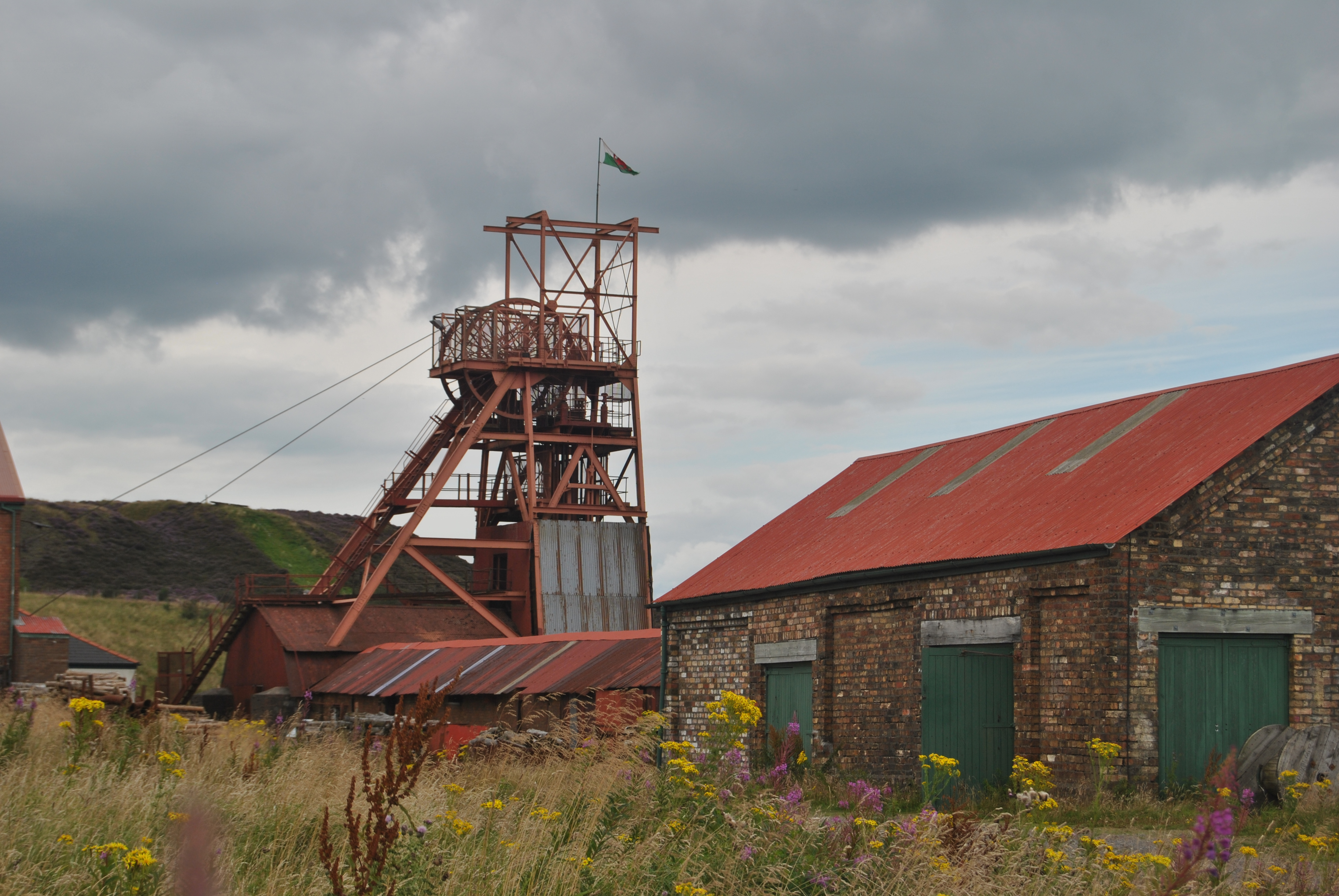
Big Pit National Coal Museum Wales

The modern history of Wales starts in 1800 and continues until the present day. In the 19th century, South Wales became heavily industrialised with ironworks; this, along with the spread of coal mining to the Cynon and Rhondda valleys from the 1840s, led to an increase in population. The social effects of industrialisation resulted in armed uprisings against the mainly English owners. Socialism developed in South Wales in the latter part of the century, accompanied by the increasing politicisation of religious Nonconformism. The first Labour Party MP, Keir Hardie, was elected as a junior member for the Welsh constituency of Merthyr Tydfil and Aberdare in 1900.

The first decade of the 20th century was the period of the coal boom in South Wales, when population growth exceeded 20 per cent. Demographic changes affected the language frontier; the proportion of Welsh speakers in the Rhondda valley fell from 64 per cent in 1901 to 55 per cent ten years later, and similar trends were evident elsewhere in South Wales. The Labour Party replaced the Liberals as the dominant party in Wales after the First World War, particularly in the industrial valleys of South Wales. Plaid Cymru was formed in 1925 but initially its growth was slow and it gained few votes at parliamentary elections. Industries, particularly the coal industry, declined after the Second World War. By the early 1990s there was only one deep pit still working in Wales. There was a similar decline in the steel industry, and the Welsh economy, like that of other developed societies, became increasingly based on the expanding service sector.

The results of the 2001 Census showed an increase in the number of Welsh speakers to 21% of the population aged 3 and older, compared with 18.7% in 1991 and 19.0% in 1981. This compares with a pattern of steady decline indicated by census results during the 20th century.

== 19th century ==
=== Industrialisation ===
In the early 19th century parts of Wales became heavily industrialised. Ironworks were set up in the South Wales Valleys, running south from the Brecon Beacons particularly around the new town of Merthyr Tydfil, with iron production later spreading westwards to the hinterlands of Neath and Swansea where anthracite coal was already being mined. From the 1840s coal mining spread to the Cynon and Rhondda valleys. This led to a rapid increase in the population of these areas.

The social effects of industrialisation led to bitter social conflict between the Welsh workers and predominantly English factory and mine owners. During the 1830s there were two armed uprisings, in Merthyr Tydfil in 1831, and the Chartist uprising in Newport in 1839, led by John Frost. The Rebecca Riots, which took place between 1839 and 1844 in South Wales and Mid Wales were rural in origin. They were a protest not only against the high tolls which had to be paid on the local turnpike roads but against rural deprivation.

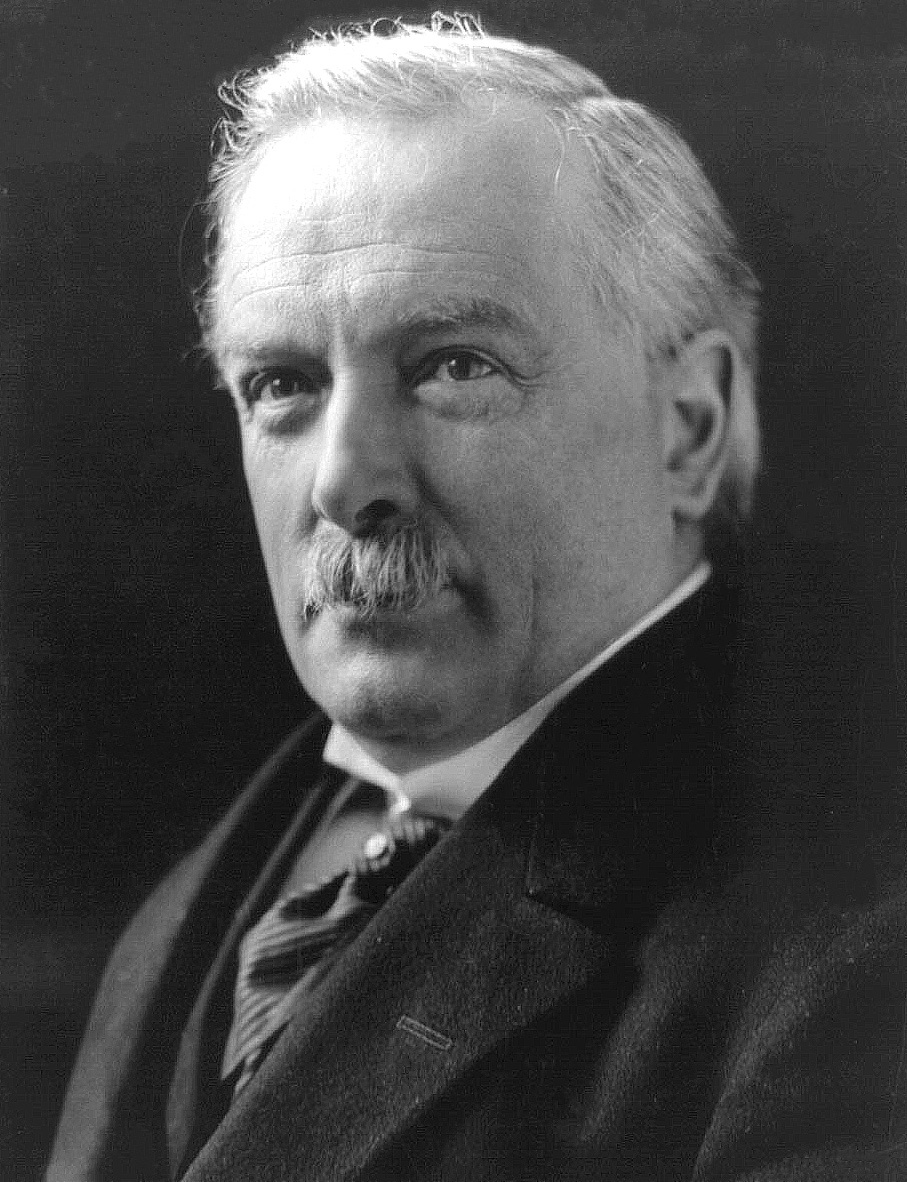
David Lloyd George

Partly as a result of these disturbances, a government inquiry was carried out into the state of education in Wales. The inquiry was carried out by three English commissioners who spoke no Welsh and relied on information from witnesses, many of them Anglican clergymen. Their report, published in 1847 as Reports of the Commissioners of Inquiry into the state of education in Wales concluded that the Welsh were ignorant, lazy and immoral, and that this was caused by the Welsh language and nonconformity. This resulted in a furious reaction in Wales, where the affair was commonly named the "Treason of the Blue Books".

Socialism gained ground rapidly in the industrial areas of South Wales in the latter part of the century, accompanied by the increasing politicisation of religious Nonconformism. The first Labour MP, Keir Hardie, was elected as junior member for the Welsh constituency of Merthyr Tydfil and Aberdare in 1900. In common with many European nations, the first movements for national autonomy began in the 1880s and 1890s with the formation of Cymru Fydd, led by Liberal Party politicians such as T. E. Ellis and David Lloyd George.

=== Agrarianism ===
Rumblings in the 1880s indicated that agrarian unrest was a distinct possibility in Wales. David Lloyd George and T. E. Ellis brought Irish reformer Michael Davitt to Wales in 1886 to campaign for reforms. Welsh reformers often compared their plight to Ireland, even though their situation was much better. Incomes were higher in Wales, and the relationships between tenant and landowner were generally friendly. There was no question of a tension between politically deprived Catholic tenants and privileged Protestant landowners. Reform languished in Wales as farmers showed little enthusiasm; reformers were divided among themselves; economic conditions improved in the 1890s, and a few moderate reforms Satisfied the Land League.

=== Religion ===
Another movement which gained strength during the 1880s was the campaign for disestablishment. Many felt that since Wales was now largely nonconformist in religion, it was inappropriate that the Church of England should be the established church in Wales. The campaign continued until the end of the century and beyond, with the passing of the Welsh Church Act 1914, which did not come into operation until 1920, after the end of the First World War.

=== Population ===
The 19th century brought about a large increase in population as Wales, like the rest of the UK, largely attributable to high birth rates and the demographic transition. In 1801 just over 587,000 people lived in Wales; by 1901, this had increased to over 2,012,000. The growth rate in the first half of the 19th century was almost 15 per cent per decade, falling to 12.5 per cent per decade for the rest of the century. However, these changes were uneven. The most significant rises in population occurred in industrial counties – Denbighshire, Flintshire, although by far the largest part of the increase was in Monmouthshire and Glamorganshire. From 1851, the population of rural counties such as Montgomeryshire and Radnorshire began to decline. The causes were complex, but included the transition from subsistence to capitalised farming, and the lure of new employment opportunities in industrial districts.

=== Migration ===
Another aspect of demographic change in the late 19th century was immigration, principally into the industrial districts of Glamorgan and Monmouthshire. Wales was the only area of the British Isles to experience net immigration from 1860 to 1914. Between 1881 and 1891, Glamorgan received a net inflow of more than 48,000 people from England.

== 20th century ==
=== Economics ===
The first decade of the 20th century was the period of the coal boom in South Wales, when population growth exceeded 20 per cent. By 1911, Glamorgan and Monmouthshire contained 63 per cent of the Welsh population, compared to a third sixty years earlier. Demographic changes affected the language frontier; the proportion of Welsh speakers in the Rhondda valley fell from 64 per cent in 1901 to 55 per cent ten years later, and similar trends were evident elsewhere in South Wales.

=== Politics ===
In the early part of the century Wales still largely supported the Liberal Party, particularly when David Lloyd George became Prime Minister of the United Kingdom during the First World War. However the Labour Party was steadily gaining ground, and in the years after World War I replaced the Liberals as the dominant party in Wales, particularly in the industrial valleys of South Wales.

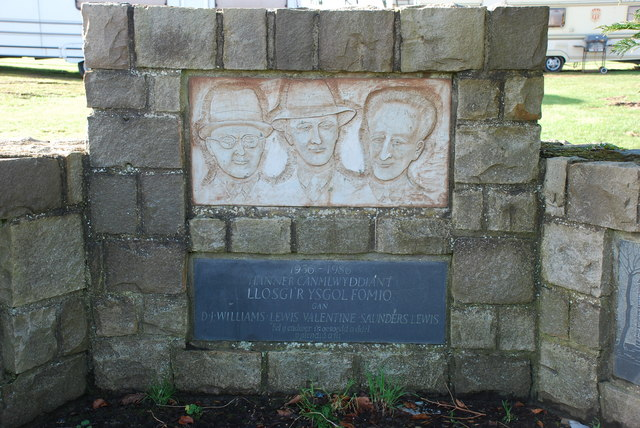
The Burning of the Bombing School Trio Memorial

Plaid Cymru was formed in 1925 but initially its growth was slow and it gained few votes at parliamentary elections. In 1936 an RAF training camp and aerodrome at Penyberth near Pwllheli was burnt by three members of Plaid Cymru – Saunders Lewis, Lewis Valentine, and D. J. Williams. This was a protest not only against the construction of the training camp, known as "the bombing school" but also against the destruction of the historic house of Penyberth to make room for it. This action and the subsequent imprisonment of the three perpetrators considerably raised the profile of Plaid Cymru, at least in the Welsh-speaking areas.

In 1955, Home Secretary Gwilym Lloyd George proclaimed Cardiff as the capital city of Wales and in 1964 the first Secretary of State for Wales was appointed, heading a Welsh Office, the first stage in administrative devolution. In 1967 the Wales and Berwick Act, which specified that for legal purposes the term "England" should include Wales, was repealed. Nationalism became a major issue during the second half of the 20th century. In 1962 Saunders Lewis gave a radio talk entitled Tynged yr iaith (The fate of the language) in which he predicted the extinction of the Welsh language unless action was taken. This led to the formation of Cymdeithas yr Iaith Gymraeg (the Welsh Language Society) the same year.

In 1940, the Mynydd Epynt community in Powys including 200 men, women and children were evicted from their homes which including 54 farms and a pub. The eviction, known as the Epynt clearance was carried out by the UK Ministry of Defence to create the Sennybridge Training Area (SENTA), which is currently the largest military training area in Wales. Nationalist sentiment grew following the flooding of the Tryweryn valley in 1965 to create a reservoir to supply water to the English city of Liverpool. Although 35 of the 36 Welsh MPs voted against the bill (one abstained), Parliament passed the bill and the village of Capel Celyn was submerged, highlighting Wales' powerlessness in her own affairs in the face of the numerical superiority of English MPs in Parliament. Separatist groupings, such as the Free Wales Army and Mudiad Amddiffyn Cymru were formed, conducting campaigns from 1963. Prior to the Investiture of Charles, Prince of Wales in 1969, these groups were responsible for a number of bomb attacks on infrastructure. At a by-election in 1966, Gwynfor Evans won the parliamentary seat of Carmarthen, Plaid Cymru's first Parliamentary seat.

The Welsh Language Act 1967 repealed a section of the Wales and Berwick Act and thus "Wales" was no longer part of the legal definition of England. This essentially defined Wales as a separate entity legally (but within the UK), for the first time since before the Laws in Wales Acts 1535 and 1542 which defined Wales as a part of the Kingdom of England. The Welsh Language Act 1967 also expanded areas where use of Welsh was permitted, including in some legal situations.

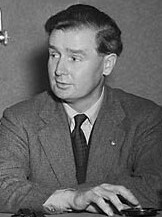
Gwynfor Evans

Plaid Cymru made gains in the two General Elections held in 1974, winning three seats. There was increased support for devolution within the Labour party and a Devolution Bill was introduced in late 1976. However a referendum on the creation of an assembly for Wales in 1979 led to a large majority for the "no" vote. The new Conservative government elected in the 1979 General Election had pledged to establish a Welsh-language television channel, but announced in September 1979 that it would not honour this pledge. This led to a campaign of non-payment of television licences by members of Plaid Cymru and an announcement by Gwynfor Evans in 1980 that he would fast unto death if a Welsh language channel was not established. In September 1980 the government announced that the channel would after all be set up, and S4C was launched in November 1982. The Welsh Language Act 1993 gave the Welsh language equal status with English in Wales with regard to the public sector. In a referendum in 1979, Wales voted against the creation of a Welsh assembly with an 80 per cent majority. In 1997, a second referendum on the same issue secured a very narrow majority (50.3 per cent). The National Assembly for Wales (Cynulliad Cenedlaethol Cymru) was set up in 1999 (under the Government of Wales Act 1998) with the power to determine how Wales' central government budget is spent and administered, although the UK Parliament reserved the right to set limits on its powers. The governments of the United Kingdom and of Wales almost invariably define Wales as a country. The Welsh Government says: "Wales is not a Principality. Although we are joined with England by land, and we are part of Great Britain, Wales is a country in its own right." (Note: The title Prince of Wales is still conferred on the heir apparent to the British throne, currently Prince Charles, but he has no constitutional role in modern Wales. According to the Welsh Government: "Our Prince of Wales at the moment is Prince Charles, who is the present heir to the throne. But he does not have a role in the governance of Wales, even though his title might suggest that he does.")

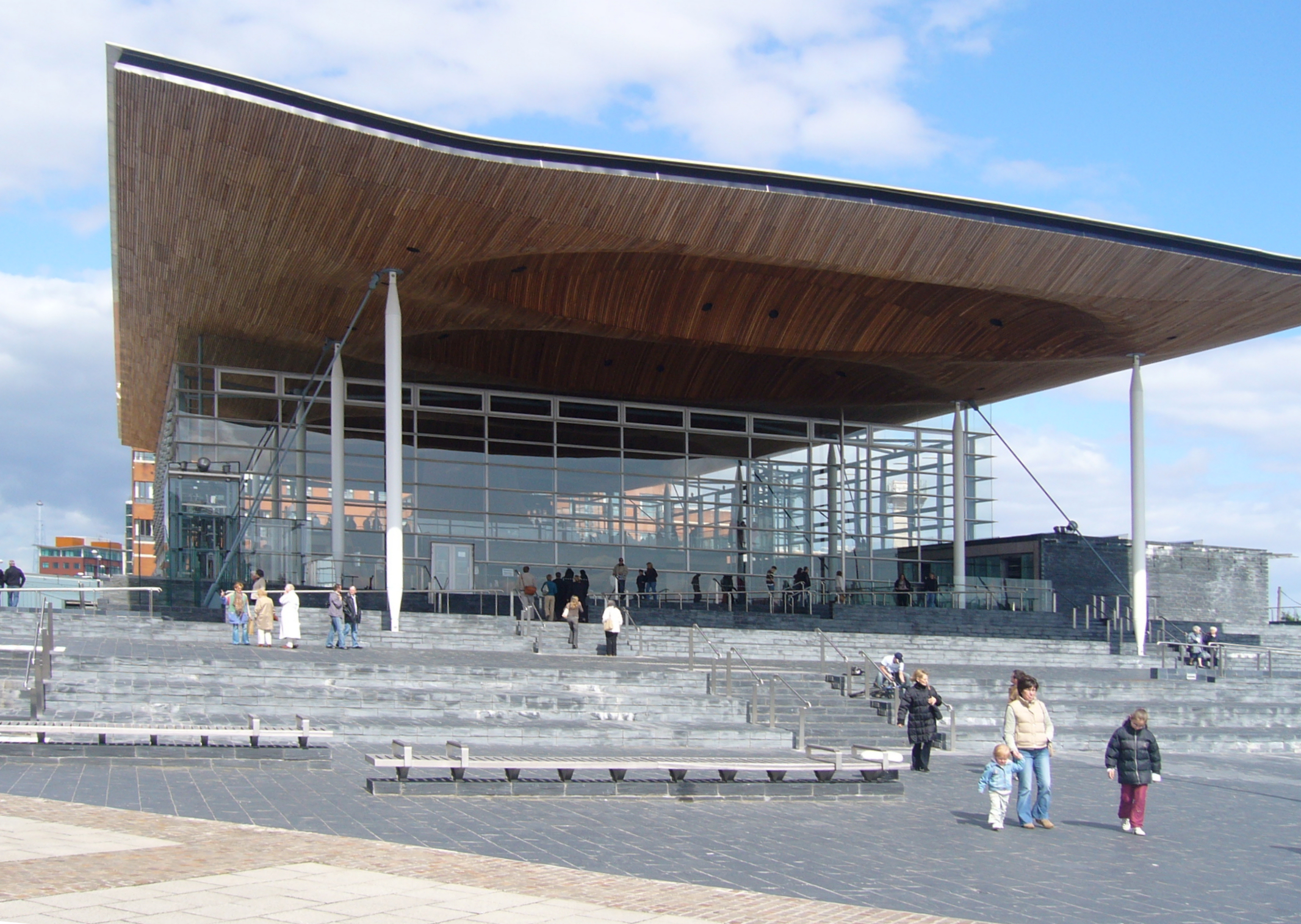
Senedd building, Cardiff Bay

In May 1997, a Labour government was elected with a promise of creating devolved institutions in Scotland and Wales. In late 1997 a referendum was held on the issue which resulted a "yes" vote, albeit by a narrow majority. The Welsh Assembly was set up in 1999 (as a consequence of the Government of Wales Act 1998) and possesses the power to determine how the government budget for Wales is spent and administered.

=== Coal mining ===
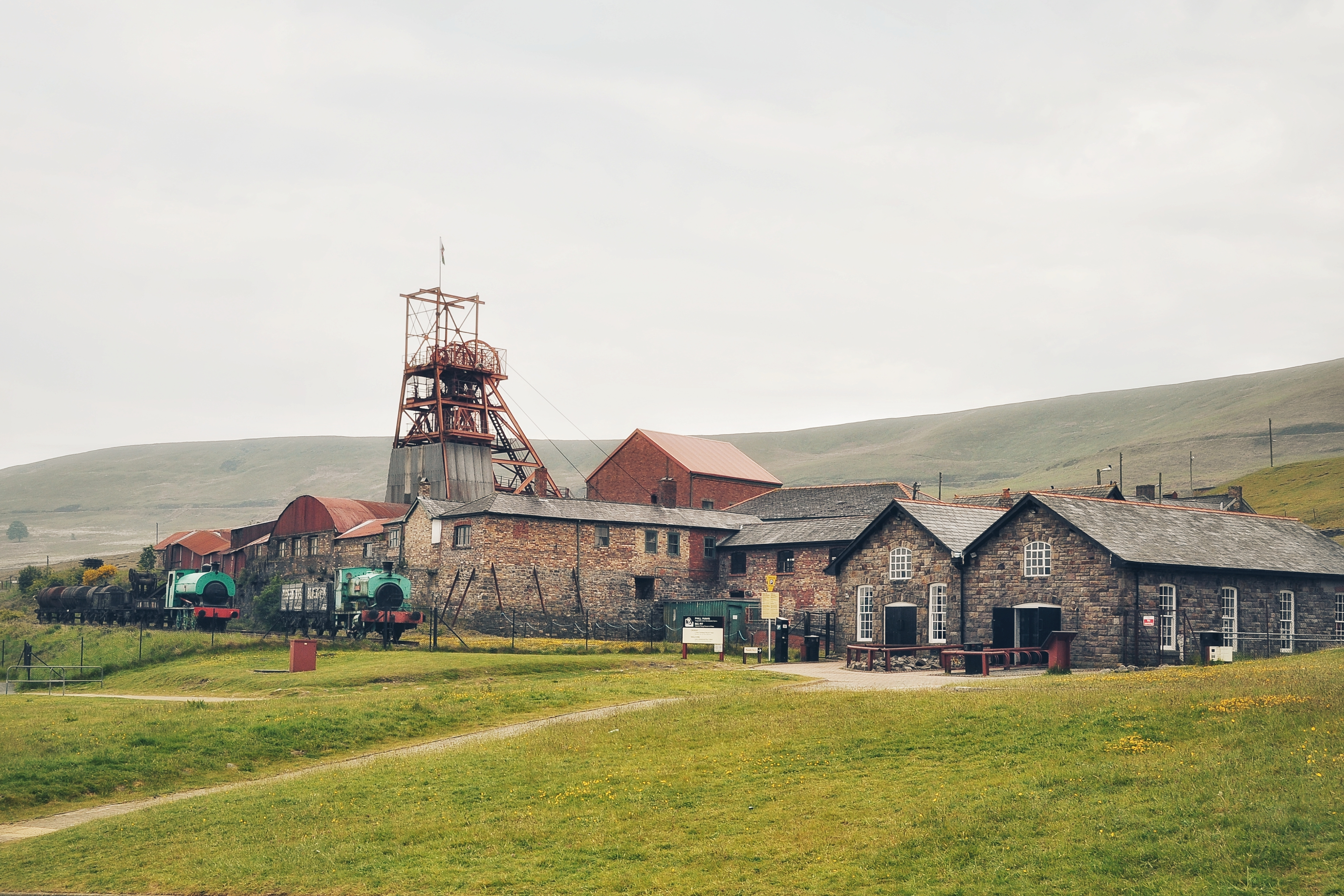
Big Pit National Coal Museum, Blaenavon, Wales June 12, 2015

The period following the Second World War saw a decline in several of the traditional industries, in particular the coal industry. The numbers employed in the South Wales coalfield, which at its peak around 1913 employed over 250,000 men, fell to around 75,000 in the mid 1960s and 30,000 in 1979.

The coal mining industry in Britain was nationalised in 1947, meaning that Welsh collieries were controlled by the National Coal Board (NCB) and regulated by HM Inspectorate of Mines. This period also saw the Aberfan disaster in 1966, when a tip of coal slurry slid down to engulf a school with 144 dead, most of them children. By the early 1990s there was only one deep pit still working in Wales. Tower Colliery, Hirwaun remained open until it was last worked in 2008 after being a co-operative since 1994. There was a similar decline in the steel industry, and the Welsh economy, like that of other developed societies, became increasingly based on the expanding service sector.

=== Religion ===
The Revival of 1904–1905 was the largest Christian revival in Wales during the 20th century. The upsurge of religious enthusiasm had a dramatic effect on the people, and triggered revivals in several other countries. J. Edwin Orr states:

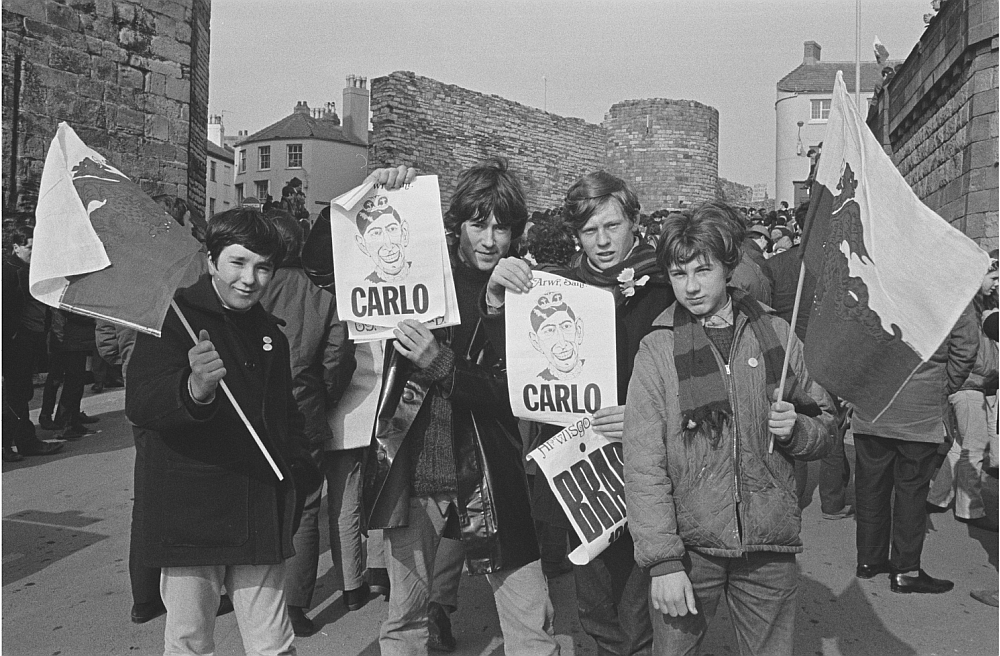
Children at the 1282 Cofia (Remember) protest against the investiture of "Prince Charles", 1969.

The movement kept the churches of Wales filled for many years to come, seats being placed in the aisles in Mount Pleasant Baptist Church in Swansea for twenty years or so, for example. Meanwhile, the Awakening swept the rest of Britain, Scandinavia, parts of Europe, North America, the mission fields of India and the Orient, Africa and Latin America.

The post-1945 years saw the erosion of some Welsh traditions, such as religious non-conformity and Sunday closing, but the increasing reassertion of Welsh distinctiveness.

=== Demographics ===
==== Population ====
Over the course of the 20th century, the population of Wales increased from just over 2,012,000 in 1901 to 2.9 million in 2001, but the process was not linear – 430,000 people left Wales between 1921 and 1940 largely owing to the economic depression of the 1930s. English in-migration became a major factor from the first decade of the 20th century, when there was a net gain of 100,000 people from England. In this era, most incomers settled in the expanding industrial areas, contributing to a partial Anglicisation of some parts of south and east Wales.

Over the century there has also been a marked increase in the proportion of the population born outside Wales; at the time of the 2001 Census 20% of Welsh residents were born in England, 2% were born in Scotland or Ireland, and 3% were born outside the UK. Whereas most incomers settled in industrial districts in the early 20th century, by the 1990s the highest proportions of people born outside Wales were found in Ceredigion, Powys, Conwy, Denbighshire and Flintshire.

==== Welsh language ====
The proportion of the Welsh population able to speak the Welsh language fell from just under 50% in 1901 to 43.5% in 1911, and continued to fall to a low of 18.9% in 1981. The results of the 2001 Census showed an increase in the number of Welsh speakers to 21% of the population aged 3 and older, compared with 18.7% in 1991 and 19.0% in 1981. This compares with a pattern of steady decline indicated by census results during the 20th century.

In the 2011 census it was recorded that the proportion of people able to speak Welsh had dropped from 20.8% to 19% (still higher than 1991). Despite an increase in the overall size of the Welsh population this still meant that the number of Welsh speakers in Wales dropped from 582,000 in 2001 to 562,000 in 2011. However this figure was still much higher than 508,000 or 18.7% of people who said they could speak Welsh in the 1991 census.

The April 2020 to March 2021Annual Population Survey reported that 29.1% of people aged three and over were able to speak Welsh which equates to 883,300 people. For October 2020 to 30 September 2021, the Annual Population Survey showed that 29.5% of people aged three or older were able to speak Welsh which equates to approximately 892,500 people.

== 21st century ==
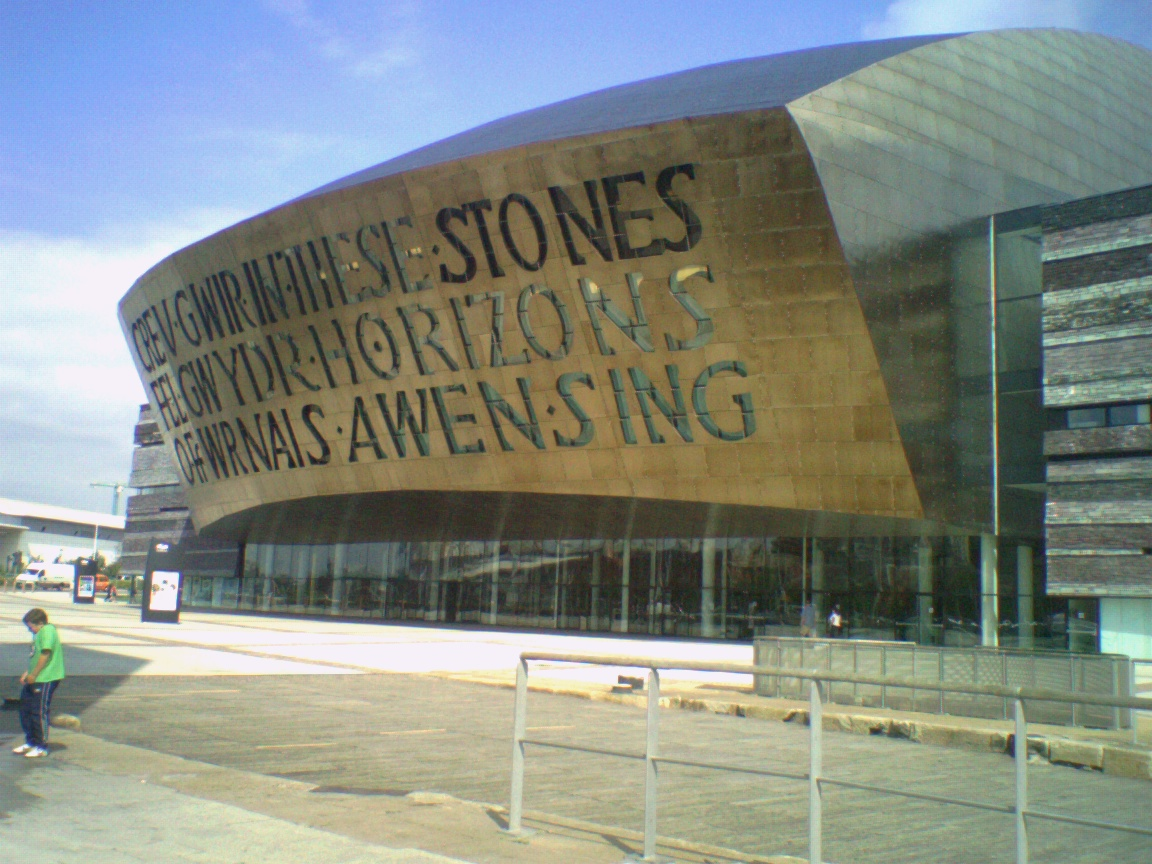
The Wales Millennium Centre, Cardiff Bay

The results of the 2001 Census showed an increase in the number of Welsh speakers to 21% of the population aged 3 and older, compared with 18.7% in 1991 and 19.0% in 1981. This compares with a pattern of steady decline indicated by census results during the 20th century.

In Cardiff the Millennium Stadium, opened in 1999, was followed by the Wales Millennium Centre opened in 2004 as a centre for cultural events, notably opera. The new Welsh Assembly building, to be known as the Senedd, was completed in February 2006 and officially opened on St. David's Day that year.

=== Devolution ===
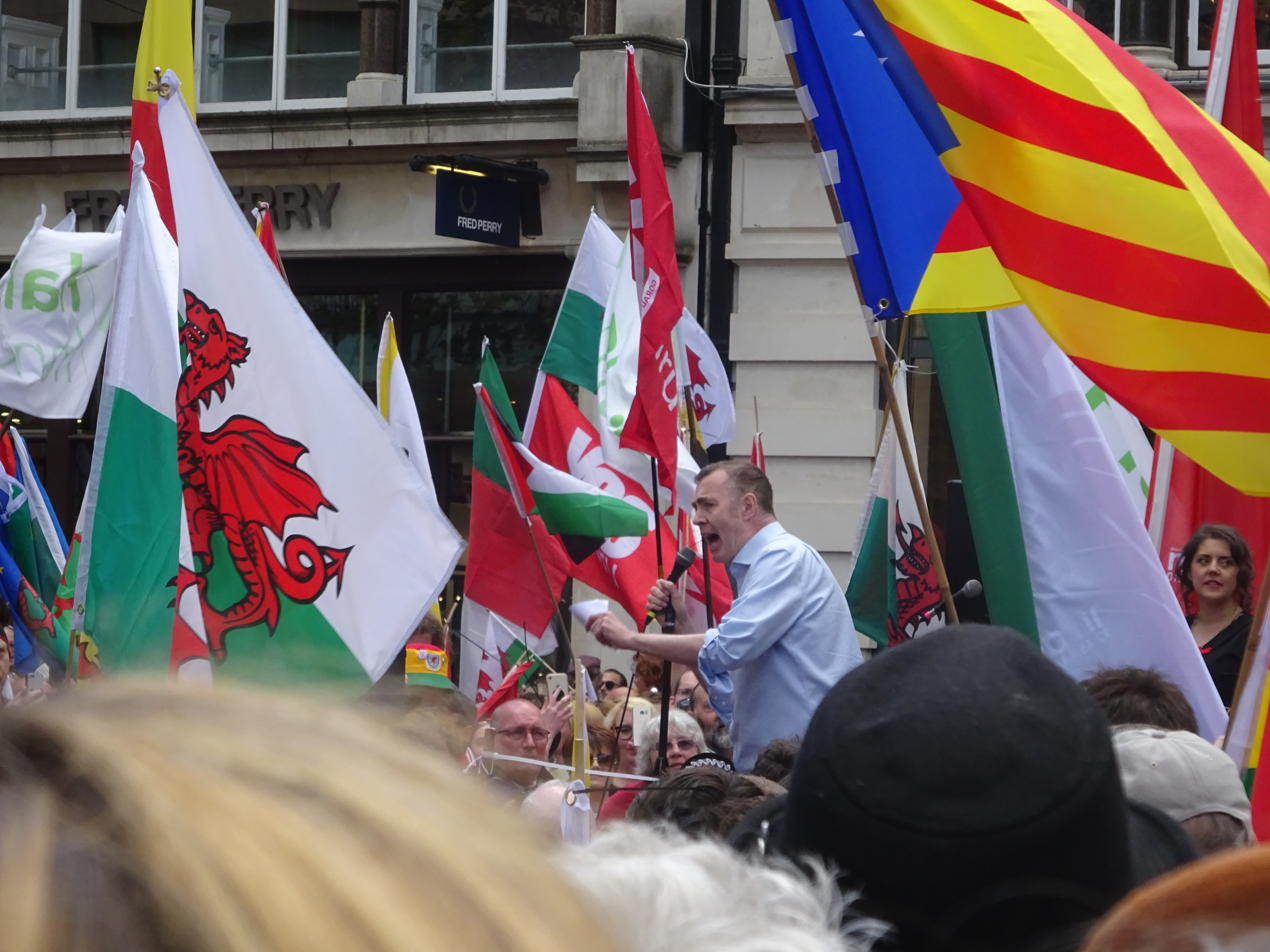
Adam Price, Plaid Cymru leader speaker at the "All Under One Banner" Welsh Independence procession in Cardiff

In 2006 the Government of Wales Act gained royal assent meaning that from May 2007 the Queen would have the new legal identity of "Her Majesty in Right of Wales" and would for the first time appoint Welsh Ministers and sign Welsh Orders in Council. It also made provision for a future referendum to ask the Welsh people if they would like the Welsh Assembly to gain the power to pass primary legislation e.g. to make true Welsh laws. A referendum on extending the law-making powers of the National Assembly was accordingly held on 3 March 2011. It asked the question: "Do you want the Assembly now to be able to make laws on all matters in the 20 subject areas it has powers for?" The result of the vote was that 63.49% voted "yes", and 36.51% voted "no". Consequently, the Assembly is now able to make laws, known as Acts of the Assembly, on all matters in the subject areas, without needing the UK Parliament's agreement.

In the 2016 referendum, Wales voted in support of leaving the European Union, although demographic differences became evident. According to Danny Dorling, professor of geography at the Oxford University, "If you look at the more genuinely Welsh areas, especially the Welsh-speaking ones, they did not want to leave the EU,"

In 2011, the International Standards Organisation, officially changed the status of Wales from a principality to a country following lobbying from Plaid Cymru AM at the time, Leanne Wood.

In May 2020, the National Assembly for Wales was renamed "Senedd Cymru" or "the Welsh Parliament", commonly known as the "Senedd" in both English and Welsh.

In 2016, YesCymru was launched. A non party-political campaign for an independent Wales which held its first rally in Cardiff in 2019. Support for Welsh independence has reached as high as 40% in 2021.

== Bibliography ==
- Austin, Tony (1967). Aberfan: The Story of a Disaster. London: Hutchinson & Co. OCLC 751632264.
- Clews, Roy (1980). To Dream of Freedom – The story of MAC and the Free Wales Army. Talybont: Y Lolfa Cyf. ISBN 978-0-86243-586-8.
- Davies, John (1994). A History of Wales. Penguin Books. ISBN 978-0-14-014581-6.
- Davies, Russell (2005). Hope and Heartbreak: A Social History of Wales and the Welsh, 1776-1871. University of Wales Press. ISBN 978-0-7083-1933-8.
- Evans, D. Gareth (1989). A History of Wales, 1815–1906. Cardiff: University of Wales Press. ISBN 978-0-7083-1027-4.
- Jones, Gareth Elwyn; Roderick, Gordon Wynne (2003). A History of Education in Wales. University of Wales Press. ISBN 978-0-7083-1808-9.
- Jones, Aled; Jones, Bill (2003). "The Welsh World and the British Empire, c. 1851–1939: An Exploration". Journal of Imperial and Commonwealth History. 31 (2): 57–81. doi:10.1080/03086530310001705606. S2CID 161177055.
- Morgan, Kenneth O. (1981). Rebirth of a Nation: Wales 1880–1980. Oxford University Press, University of Wales Press. ISBN 978-0-19-821736-7.
- Morgan, Gareth (2005). "Rugby and Revivalism: Sport and Religion in Edwardian Wales". International Journal of the History of Sport. 22 (3): 434–456. doi:10.1080/09523360500064057. S2CID 143995387.
- Philip, Alan Butt (1975). The Welsh Question: Nationalism in Welsh Politics, 1945–1970. University of Wales Press. ISBN 978-0-7083-0537-9.
- Ross, David (2014). Wales: History of a Nation (2nd ed.). Waverley. ISBN 978-1-84934-179-0.
- Smith, Dai (1980). A People and a Proletariat: Essays in the History of Wales, 1780–1980. Pluto Press in association with Llafur, the Society for the Study of Welsh Labour History. ISBN 978-0-86104-321-7.
- Williams, David (1977). A History of Modern Wales. J. Murray. ISBN 978-0-7195-3357-0.
- Williams, Gwyn A. (1985). When was Wales?: A History of the Welsh. Penguin Books. ISBN 978-0-14-022589-1.
- Williams, John L. (1995). Was Wales Industrialised?: Essays in Modern Welsh History. Gomer Press. ISBN 978-1-85902-139-2.

=== Teaching and historiography ===
- Gruffudd, Pyrs (1994). "Back to the land: historiography, rurality and the nation in interwar Wales". Transactions of the Institute of British Geographers. 19 (1): 61–77. Bibcode:1994TrIBG..19...61G. doi:10.2307/622446. JSTOR 622446.
- Phillips, Robert (1996). "History teaching, cultural restorationism and national identity in England and Wales". Curriculum Studies. 4 (3): 385–399. doi:10.1080/0965975960040305.
- Raftery, Deirdre; McDermid, Jane; Jones, Gareth Elwyn (2007). "Social Change and Education in Ireland, Scotland and Wales: Historiography on Nineteenth-century Schooling". History of Education: Journal of the History of Education Society. 36 (4–5): 447–463. doi:10.1080/00467600701496690. S2CID 143116479.
