= Sunday Closing (Wales) Act 1881 =

Act of the Parliament of the United Kingdom

Sunday Closing (Wales) Act 1881 (Note: Section 5.)
- Act of Parliament
- Parliament of the United Kingdom
- Long title: An Act to prohibit the Sale of Intoxicating Liquors on Sunday in Wales.
- Citation: 44 & 45 Vict. c. 61
- Territorial extent: Wales (Note: Section 1.)

Dates
- Royal assent: 27 August 1881
- Commencement: (Note: Section 3.)
- Repealed: 1 January 1911
Other legislation
Repealed by	Licensing (Consolidation) Act 1910
Relates to	Laws in Wales Acts 1535–1542; Wales and Berwick Act 1746; Welsh Language Act 1967; Government of Wales Act 1998

Status: Repealed

Text of statute as originally enacted

The Sunday Closing (Wales) Act 1881 (44 & 45 Vict. c. 61) was an act of the Parliament of the United Kingdom. It was one of the Licensing Acts 1828 to 1886. It required the closure of all public houses in Wales on Sundays. The act had considerable political importance as a formal acknowledgement of the separate character of Wales, setting a precedent for future legislation and decisions. It was repealed in 1911.

== Introduction of the legislation ==
The legislation was introduced by the Liberal Government elected in 1880 under Prime Minister William Ewart Gladstone. It was the first act since the annexation of Wales which specifically applied only to Wales. A similar bill which would have applied in England was rejected by Parliament. The 1881 Act did not apply to Monmouthshire, but was extended over that county in 1915 under wartime legislation which was reaffirmed in 1921. However, later acts which were specific to Wales, including the Welsh Intermediate Education Act 1889 (52 & 53 Vict. c. 40), were also applied to Monmouthshire.

== Background and effects ==
The legislation followed pressure by the temperance movement and, in particular, the nonconformist chapels. According to historian John Davies, the public houses in Wales had become "recruiting centres for the Conservative Party" following earlier Liberal legislation to restrict the licensed trade, and there was considerable backing among Welsh working class men to restrict their opening. However, one of the effects of the legislation was to encourage the opening of a large number of private social clubs which were excluded from it, and the legislation seems to have had little effect on drunkenness. According to Davies, "above all, [the legislation] connected Welshness with negativity", and it became increasingly unpopular through the 20th century.

== Repeal ==
The whole act was repealed by section 112 of, and the seventh schedule to, the Licensing (Consolidation) Act 1910 (10 Edw. 7 & 1 Geo. 5. c. 24), which came into force on 1 January 1911.

Sunday closing, however, was retained. The Licensing Act 1961 enabled local authorities in Wales to hold polls if their electorate wished to retain, remove or readopt Sunday closing. Shortly after the Act's enactment, there was a nationwide referendum in 1961.

This first referendum oversaw the removal of Sunday closing in Monmouthshire, Newport, Cardiff, Glamorgan, Swansea, Merthyr Tydfil and Flintshire. Another referendum was held in 1968, which led to the abandonment of Sunday closing in Brecknockshire, Radnorshire and Denbighshire. The last district to follow suit was Dwyfor, which removed Sunday closing in 1996. The requirement for regular polls on Sunday opening in Wales was abolished by the Licensing Act 2003.
