= England and Wales =

Legal jurisdiction in the United Kingdom

England and Wales Cymru a Lloegr (Welsh)
- Legal jurisdiction
- Map of England and Wales in the United Kingdom
- Sovereign state: United Kingdom
- Formed: 1535–1542
- Named for: England and Wales

Government
  - Body: Parliament of the United Kingdom

Area
  - Land: 58,320 sq mi (151,047 km^{2})

Population (2025)
  - Total: 62,009,993
  - Density: 1,060/sq mi (411/km^{2})
- Time zone: UTC+0 (GMT)
  - Summer (DST): UTC+1 (BST)
- GSS code: K04000001

England and Wales (Welsh: Cymru a Lloegr, lit. 'Wales and England') is one of the three legal jurisdictions of the United Kingdom. It covers the two constituent countries of England and Wales, and was formed by the Laws in Wales Acts 1535 and 1542. The substantive law of the jurisdiction is English law. In a legal sense, the jurisdiction was simply known as England from 1746 to 1967.

The devolved Senedd (Welsh Parliament; Welsh: Senedd Cymru) – previously named the National Assembly for Wales – was created in 1999 by the Government of Wales Act 1998 and provides a degree of self-government in Wales. The powers of the legislature were expanded by the Government of Wales Act 2006, which allowed it to pass its own laws, with the Act also formally separating the Welsh Government from the Senedd. There is currently no equivalent body for England, which is directly governed by the parliament and government of the United Kingdom.

== History of jurisdiction ==
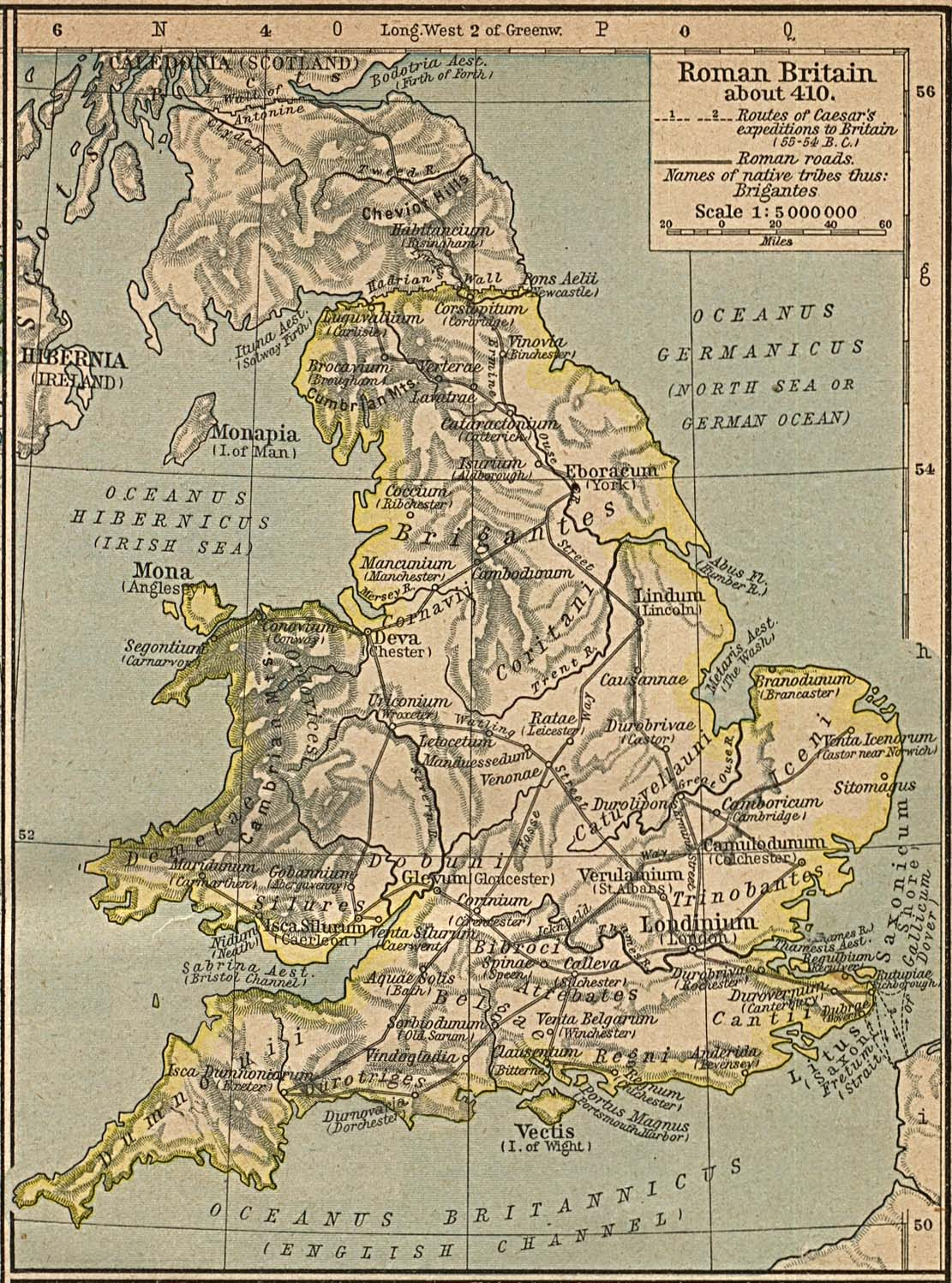
The Roman province of Britannia in 410

During the Roman occupation of Britain, the area of present-day England and Wales was administered as a single unit, except for the land to the north of Hadrian's Wall – though the Roman-occupied area varied in extent, and for a time extended to the Antonine/Severan Wall (situated entirely in modern-day Scotland). It is thought that at that time most of the native inhabitants of Roman Britain spoke Brythonic languages, but they were all regarded as Britons, divided into numerous tribes. After the conquest, the Romans administered this region as a single unit, the province of Britain.

Long after the departure of the Romans, the Britons in what became Wales developed their own system of law, first codified by Hywel Dda (Hywel the Good; reigned 942–950) when he was king of most of present-day Wales (compare King of Wales); in England Anglo-Saxon law was initially codified by Alfred the Great in his Legal Code, c. 893. However, after the Norman invasion of Wales in the 11th century, English law came to apply in the parts of Wales conquered by the Normans (the Welsh Marches). In 1283, the English, led by Edward I, with the biggest army brought together in England since the 11th century, conquered the remainder of Wales, then organised as the Principality of Wales. This was then united with the English crown by the Statute of Rhuddlan of 1284. This aimed to replace Welsh criminal law with English law.

Welsh law continued to be used for civil cases until the annexation of Wales to England in the 16th century by the Welsh House of Tudor. The Laws in Wales Acts 1535 and 1542 then consolidated the administration of all the Welsh territories and incorporated them fully into the legal system of the Kingdom of England. This was in part to update outdated Welsh laws, but also to control Wales alongside England; through these acts, the Welsh could be seen as equals to the English. This was reflected on both Henry VIII and Elizabeth I's coat of arms where the dragon represented Wales and the lion represented England. When the Tudor dynasty ended with the death of Elizabeth I the red dragon of Wales was replaced with the unicorn of Scotland with the succession of King James I who demoted Wales' status on the coat of arms and on the first adaptation of the Flag of Great Britain.

Prior to 1746, it was not clear whether a reference to "England" in legislation included Wales, and so in 1746, Parliament passed the Wales and Berwick Act 1746. This specified that in all prior and future laws, references to "England" would by default include Wales (and Berwick-upon-Tweed). The Wales and Berwick Act was repealed by the Welsh Language Act 1967, although the statutory definition of "England" created by that Act still applies for laws passed before 1967. In new legislation since then, what was referred to as "England" is now "England and Wales", while subsequent references to "England" and "Wales" refer to those political divisions.

=== Wales jurisdiction ===
There have been multiple calls from both Welsh academics and politicians for a Wales criminal justice system.

== Law ==
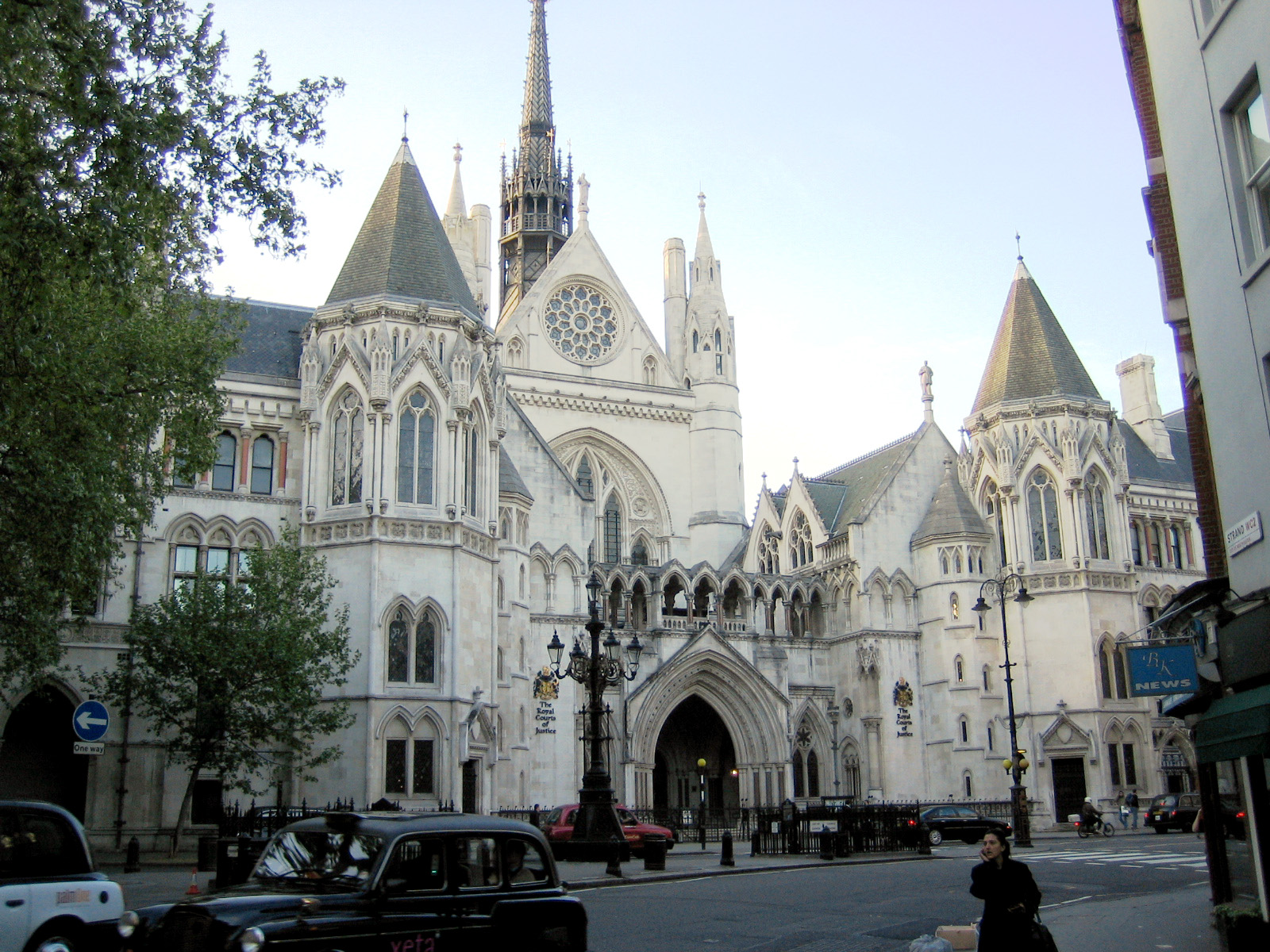
The Royal Courts of Justice of England and Wales

England and Wales are treated as a single unit for some purposes, because the two form the constitutional successor to the former Kingdom of England. The continuance of Scots law was guaranteed under the 1706 Treaty of Union that led to the Acts of Union 1707, and as a consequence English law—and after 1801, Irish law—continued to be separate. Following the two Acts of Union, Parliament can restrict the effect of its laws to part of the realm, and generally the effect of laws, where restricted, was originally applied to one or more of the former kingdoms. Thus, most laws applicable to England also applied to Wales. However, Parliament now passes laws applicable to Wales and not to England (and vice versa), a practice which was rare before the middle of the 20th century. Examples are the Welsh Language Acts 1967 and 1993 and the Government of Wales Act 1998. Measures and Acts of the Senedd apply in Wales, but not in England.

Following the Government of Wales Act, effective since May 2007, the Senedd can legislate on matters devolved to it. Following a referendum on 3 March 2011, the Senedd gained direct law-making powers, without the need to consult Westminster. This was the first time in almost 500 years that Wales had its own powers to legislate. Each piece of Welsh legislation is known as an Act of Senedd Cymru.

=== Company registration ===
For a company to be incorporated in the United Kingdom, its application for registration with Companies House must state "whether the company's registered office is to be situated in England and Wales (or in Wales), in Scotland or in Northern Ireland", which will determine the law applicable to that business entity. A registered office must be specified as "in Wales" if the company wishes to use a name ending cyfyngedig or cyf, rather than Limited or Ltd. or to avail itself of certain other privileges relating to the official use of the Welsh language.

== Other bodies ==
Outside the legal system, the position is mixed. Some organisations combine as "England and Wales", others are separate.

- In sports, cricket has a combined international team (simply called "England") administered by the England and Wales Cricket Board, who also govern the sport across both nations, and Glamorgan County Cricket Club participates in the English and Welsh county cricket system. In football, rugby union, rugby league, the Commonwealth Games and other sports have separate national representative teams for each country. A few Welsh association football clubs, most notably Cardiff City F.C. and Swansea City A.F.C., play in the English football league system, while The New Saints F.C., which represents places on both sides of the border, plays in the Welsh football league system. The Anglo-Welsh Cup was a rugby union competition contested by Welsh regions and English Premiership clubs between 1971 and 2018.
- Some religious denominations organise on the basis of England and Wales, most notably the Roman Catholic Church, but also small denominations, e.g. the Evangelical Presbyterian Church. Prior to the disestablishment of the Church in Wales in 1920, the Anglican church in Britain operated under the jurisdiction of the Church of England throughout Wales and England.
- The Electoral Commission maintains a register of political parties, organised according to where the party operates (either England, Wales or England and Wales). The Green Party of England and Wales stands candidates only in English and Welsh constituencies; separate Green parties exist in Scotland and in Northern Ireland.
- Some professional bodies represent England and Wales, for example the Chartered Institute of Legal Executives, the Institute of Chartered Accountants in England and Wales, the General Council of the Bar, The Law Society, the National Farmers Union, the Police Federation of England and Wales and the Trades Union Congress.
- Other examples include the Canal & River Trust, the Charity Commission, the Drinking Water Inspectorate, the General Register Office for England and Wales, His Majesty's Inspectorate of Constabulary and Fire & Rescue Services, HM Land Registry, His Majesty's Prison Service, Mountain Rescue England and Wales, the NHS Business Services Authority, Ofwat, the Probation Service, the Solicitors Regulation Authority, the Worshipful Company of Chartered Accountants and the Youth Hostels Association.

== Order of precedence ==
The order of precedence in England and Wales is distinct from those of Northern Ireland and Scotland, and from Commonwealth realms.

== National parks ==
The national parks of England and Wales have a distinctive legislative framework and history.

== See also ==
- Courts of England and Wales
- Cultural relationship between the Welsh and the English
- Judiciary of England and Wales
- Proposed Wales justice system
