= Gaelic Language (Scotland) Act 2005 =

Act of the Scottish Parliament

Gaelic Language (Scotland) Act 2005 (Note: Section 13(1).)
- Act of the Scottish Parliament
- Scottish Parliament
- Long title: An Act of the Scottish Parliament to establish a body having functions exercisable with a view to securing the status of the Gaelic language as an official language of Scotland commanding equal respect to the English language, including the functions of preparing a national Gaelic language plan, of requiring certain public authorities to prepare and publish Gaelic language plans in connection with the exercise of their functions and to maintain and implement such plans, and of issuing guidance in relation to Gaelic education.
- Citation: 2005 asp 7
- Territorial extent: Scotland

Dates
- Royal assent: 1 June 2005
- Commencement: 13 February 2006 (Note: Section 13(2). The Gaelic Language (Scotland) Act 2005 Commencement Order 2006.)
Other legislation
Amends	Scottish Public Services Ombudsman Act 2002
Amended by	Electronic Communications (Scotland) Order 2006; Companies Act 2006; Food (Scotland) Act 2015; Education (Scotland) Act 2016

Status: Amended

Text of statute as originally enacted

Text of the Gaelic Language (Scotland) Act 2005 as in force today (including any amendments) within the United Kingdom, from legislation.gov.uk.

The Gaelic Language (Scotland) Act 2005 (asp 7) (Scottish Gaelic: Achd na Gàidhlig (Alba) 2005) is an act of the Scottish Parliament passed in 2005. It was the first piece of legislation dedicated to the Scottish Gaelic language and was the first step by the Scottish Executive to provide a legislative framework for the use of Gaelic by Scottish Public sector authorities. It created a Gaelic Language Board, but no general rights of citizens or obligations on statutory authorities to actually use the language. This is in contrast to the UK parliament's legislation for the Welsh Language (the Welsh Language Act 1993) which authorises the use of Welsh in public administration.

== Passage of the act ==
The bill was introduced into the Scottish Parliament on 28 September 2004 by Peter Peacock. On 21 April 2005 the Parliament voted unanimously to approve the bill.

== Purpose ==
The Gaelic Language Act aims to secure Gaelic as an official language of Scotland, "commanding equal respect" with English, by establishing Bòrd na Gàidhlig as part of the framework of government in Scotland and also requiring the creation of a national plan for Gaelic to provide strategic direction for the development of the Gaelic language. The phrase "equal respect" contains no clear meaning in the law. Its usage was chosen to prevent the assumption that the Gaelic language is in any way considered to have "equal validity or parity of esteem with English".

The act also gives Bòrd na Gàidhlig a key role in promoting Gaelic in Scotland, advising Scottish Ministers on Gaelic issues, driving forward Gaelic planning and preparing guidance on Gaelic education. The Act also provides a framework for the creation of Gaelic language plans by Scottish public authorities.

Peter Peacock, who, at the time of the Act coming into force, had ministerial responsibility for Gaelic, said: "This is a momentous day for Gaelic as we open a new chapter in the language's history. We have come a long way since the dark days of 1616 when an Act of Parliament ruled that Gaelic should be 'abolishit and removit' from Scotland."

A key limitation of the act is that it applies only to public bodies operating in Scotland and whose business is classed as being a devolved matter (outlined by the Scotland Act 1998).

== The National Gaelic Language Plan 2012–17 ==
"The Plan includes proposals for the promotion of strategies for increasing the number able to speak Gaelic, encouraging its use and facilitating access to Gaelic language and culture." The Plan addresses the following:

- An increase in the acquisition and use of Gaelic by young people in the home and increased numbers of children entering Gaelic-medium early years education.
- An increase in the number of children enrolling in Gaelic-medium education (GME), doubling the current annual intake to 800 by 2017.
- A year on year increase in the number of pupils engaged in Gaelic-learner education (GLE) in both primary and secondary schools.
- An expansion in the availability of Gaelic-medium subjects in secondary schools.
- An increase in the number of adults acquiring Gaelic from the current total of around 2,000 to 3,000 by 2017 and enhanced language skills among fluent Gaelic speakers.
- More opportunities for communities and networks of Gaelic speakers of all kinds to use Gaelic and increased use of the language in community activities and services.
- Expansion of the use of Gaelic in places of work and an increase in employment opportunities where Gaelic skills are required in order to enable service delivery in the language.
- Development of Gaelic arts and media as a means of promoting the language, attracting people to it and enhancing their commitment through opportunities to learn, use and develop Gaelic.
- An increased profile for Gaelic in the heritage and tourism sectors and increased use of Gaelic in the interpretation of Scotland's history and culture.
- Co-ordination of the initiatives of parties active in Gaelic language corpus development to achieve enhanced strength, relevance, consistency and visibility of the Gaelic language in Scotland.

== Further developments ==
In 2025, the Scottish Languages Act 2025 was passed to the Scottish Parliament, which gave recognition to the Scots language and build on the Gaelic Language (Scotland) Act 2005.

== See also ==
- Official Languages Act 2003 (Republic of Ireland)
- Welsh Language Act 1967
- Welsh Language Act 1993
- Irish Language Act (Northern Ireland)
- Scottish Languages Act 2025
- Language policy
