= Taffy was a Welshman =

Nursery rhyme

Nursery rhyme
- Published: c. 1780
- Songwriter: Unknown

"Taffy was a Welshman" is an anti-Welsh nursery rhyme which was popular between the eighteenth and twentieth centuries. It has a Roud Folk Song Index number of 19237.

== Lyrics ==
Versions of this rhyme vary. Some common versions are:

Taffy was a Welshman, Taffy was a thief;
Taffy came to my house and stole a leg of beef;
I went to Taffy's house, Taffy was in bed;
I took the leg of meat and hit him on the head.

Taffy was a Welshman, Taffy was a thief;
Taffy came to my house and stole a piece of beef;
I went to Taffy's house, Taffy wasn't in;
I jumped on his Sunday hat and poked it with a pin.

Taffy was a Welshman, Taffy was a sham;
Taffy came to my house and stole a piece of lamb;
I went to Taffy's house, Taffy was away,
I stuffed his socks with sawdust and filled his shoes with clay.

Taffy was a Welshman, Taffy was a cheat,
Taffy came to my house, and stole a piece of meat;
I went to Taffy's house, Taffy was not there,
I hung his coat and trousers to roast before a fire.

== Origins and history ==
The term "Taffy" may be a merging of the common Welsh name "Dafydd" (Welsh pronunciation: [ˈdavɨð]) and the Welsh river "Taff" on which Cardiff is built, and seems to have been in use by the mid-eighteenth century. A rhyme in Tommy Thumb's Pretty Song Book, printed in London around 1744, has the lyrics:

Taffy was born
On a Moon Shiny Night,
His head in the Pipkin,
His Heels upright.

The earliest record we have of the better known rhyme is from Nancy Cock's Pretty Song Book, printed in London about 1780, which had one verse:

Taffy was a Welshman, Taffy was a thief;
Taffy came to my house and stole a piece of beef;
I went to Taffy's house, Taffy wasn't home;
Taffy came to my house and stole a marrow-bone.

Similar versions were printed in collections in the late eighteenth century, however, in Songs for the Nursery printed in 1805, the level of violence in the poem increased:

I went to Taffy's house, Taffy was in bed,
I took the marrow bone and beat about his head.

In the 1840s James Orchard Halliwell collected a two verse version that followed this with:

I went to Taffy's house, Taffy was not in;
Taffy came to my house and stole a silver pin.
I went to Taffy's house, Taffy was in bed;
I took up a poker and threw it at his head.

This version seems to have been particularly popular in the English counties that bordered Wales, where it was sung on Saint David's Day (1 March) complete with leek-wearing effigies of Welshmen.
