= Welsh Language (Wales) Measure 2011 =

Measure of the National Assembly for Wales

- Measure of the National Assembly for Wales
- National Assembly for Wales
- Long title: A Measure of the National Assembly for Wales to make provision about the official status of the Welsh language in Wales; to provide for a Welsh Language Partnership Council; to establish the Office of Welsh Language Commissioner; to provide for an Advisory Panel to the Welsh Language Commissioner; to make provision about promoting and facilitating the use of the Welsh language and treating the Welsh language no less favourably than the English language; to make provision about standards relating to the Welsh language (including duties to comply with those standards, and rights arising from the enforceability of those duties); to make provision about investigation of interference with the freedom to use the Welsh language; to establish a Welsh Language Tribunal; to abolish the Welsh Language Board and Welsh language schemes; and for connected purposes.
- Citation: 2011 nawm 1
- Territorial extent: Wales

Dates
- Royal approval: 9 February 2011

Status: Current legislation

History of passage through the Assembly

Text of statute as originally enacted

Text of the Welsh Language (Wales) Measure 2011 as in force today (including any amendments) within the United Kingdom, from legislation.gov.uk.

The Welsh Language (Wales) Measure 2011 (nawm 1; Welsh: Mesur y Gymraeg (Cymru) 2011) is a measure of the National Assembly for Wales that established several provisions with regard to Welsh as an official language of Wales. The measure notably established the Welsh Language Commissioner role.

== Function ==
Welsh is an official language of Wales, and is treated no less favourably than the English language, according to the Welsh Government's interpretation of the Welsh Language (Wales) Measure 2011.

The Welsh Language (Wales) Measure 2011 recognises that Welsh and English are official languages and established a legal framework for a statutory duty on public bodies in Wales to comply with Welsh standards. The legislation allows people to live through the medium of Welsh if they so wish. The legislation states “the Welsh language must not be treated less favourably than the English language”.

The 2011 measure also created the Welsh Language Commissioner post, which replaced the Welsh Language Board. The Commissioner's role is to promote and facilitate the use of Welsh and ensure that it is treated no less favourably than English. The Commissioner can also investigate alleged interferences with an individual's freedom to use Welsh in certain circumstances and is supported by an advisory panel.

The measure also makes provisions for Welsh standards of conduct, gradually replacing the Welsh Language Act 1993 schemes. Only bodies listed or falling within a named category must comply with standards and the Commissioner is able to investigate for breach of standards. The Commissioner's decisions can be challenged by the Welsh Language Tribunal created under the Measure.

The Measure also makes provisions for a Welsh Language Partnership Council which can give advice to Welsh Ministers about their Welsh language strategy.

== History ==
On 7 December 2010, the Welsh Assembly unanimously approved a set of measures to develop the use of the Welsh language within Wales. On 9 February 2011 this measure, the Welsh Language (Wales) Measure 2011, was passed and received Royal Assent, thus making the Welsh language an officially recognised language within Wales. The measure:

- confirms the official status of the Welsh language
- creates a new system of placing duties on bodies to provide services through the medium of Welsh
- creates a Welsh Language Commissioner with strong enforcement powers to protect the rights of Welsh-speaking people to access services through the medium of Welsh
- establishes a Welsh Language Tribunal
- gives individuals and bodies the right to appeal decisions made in relation to the provision of services through the medium of Welsh
- creates a Welsh Language Partnership Council to advise Government on its strategy in relation to the Welsh language
- allows for an official investigation by the Welsh Language Commissioner of instances where there is an attempt to interfere with the freedom of Welsh-speaking people to use the language with one another

The measure requires public bodies and some private companies to provide services in Welsh. The Welsh government's Minister for Heritage at the time, Alun Ffred Jones, said, "The Welsh language is a source of great pride for the people of Wales, whether they speak it or not, and I am delighted that this measure has now become law. I am very proud to have steered legislation through the Assembly which confirms the official status of the Welsh language; which creates a strong advocate for Welsh speakers and will improve the quality and quantity of services available through the medium of Welsh. I believe that everyone who wants to access services in the Welsh language should be able to do so, and that is what this government has worked towards. This legislation is an important and historic step forward for the language, its speakers and for the nation."

The measure was not welcomed warmly by all supporters: Bethan Williams, chairman of the Welsh Language Society (Cymdeithas yr Iaith Gymraeg) gave a mixed response to the move, saying, "Through this measure we have won official status for the language and that has been warmly welcomed. But there was a core principle missing in the law passed by the Assembly before Christmas. It doesn't give language rights to the people of Wales in every aspect of their lives. Despite that, an amendment to that effect was supported by 18 Assembly Members from three different parties, and that was a significant step forward."

On 5 October 2011, Meri Huws, Chair of the Welsh Language Board, was appointed the new Welsh Language Commissioner. Aled Roberts was the commissioner from 2019 to 2022. In October 2022, Efa Gruffudd Jones was appointed as Welsh Language Commissioner, to take up the position in January 2023.

== See also ==
- Welsh Courts Act 1942
- Welsh Language Act 1967
- Welsh Language Act 1993
- National Assembly for Wales (Official Languages) Act 2012
