= Welsh Courts Act 1942 =

Act of the Parliament of the United Kingdom

Welsh Courts Act 1942 (Note: Section 4(1).)
- Act of Parliament
- Parliament of the United Kingdom
- Long title: An Act to repeal section seventeen of the statute 27 Hen. 8. c. 26, to remove doubt as to the right of Welsh speaking persons to testify in the Welsh language in courts of justice in Wales, and to enable rules to be made for the administration of oaths and affirmations in that language, and for the provision, employment, and payment, of interpreters in such courts.
- Citation: 5 & 6 Geo. 6. c. 40
- Territorial extent: United Kingdom

Dates
- Royal assent: 22 October 1942
- Commencement: 22 October 1942 (Note: The Acts of Parliament (Commencement) Act 1793.)
- Repealed: 21 December 1992
Other legislation
Amends	Laws in Wales Act 1535
Amended by	Administration of Justice Act 1977
Repealed by	Welsh Language Act 1967; Welsh Language Act 1993
Relates to	Laws in Wales Acts 1535 and 1542

Status: Repealed

Text of statute as originally enacted

Revised text of statute as amended

The Welsh Courts Act 1942 (Welsh: Deddf Llysoedd Cymreig 1942) (5 & 6 Geo. 6. c. 40) was an act of the Parliament of the United Kingdom that allowed the Welsh language to be used in courts in Wales and Monmouthshire provided that the person speaking would be under a disadvantage in having to speak English.

For the first time, the act repealed laws passed by Henry VIII that made English the only permitted language of courts of laws in Wales.

== Background and bill debate ==
A petition calling for equal status for the Welsh language was launched at the 1938 National Eisteddfod of Wales, gathering over 250,000 signatures were gathered and supported by 30 of 36 Welsh MPs.

Charles Edwards, MP for Bedwellty, said of the bill:

I was at one time check-weigher at the Nine-Mile Point colliery and local representative of the men. When the pit was first sunk, many people came to it from other parts, and I remember that some of the north Welshmen who came could not speak a word of English. When they came to see me about something or other, I could not follow their deep Welsh, and there had to be an interpreter between us. If those men did something wrong and had to go to the local courts, they were at a great disadvantage. It is for that sort of reason that I think this bill does a very reasonable thing.

Viscount Sankey said of the bill during a Lords debate:

Many Welshman who speak English think in Welsh. I have often observed that in this House even some of our most eloquent speakers and skilful debaters pause for a moment to get the precise word or to find the exact expression. No doubt many members of this House read French easily and speak it well; many speak it perfectly; yet how should we like to be examined and cross-examined in French?

Should we not be rather nervous and embarrassed witnesses and fail to do ourselves justice? We should possibly be thinking in English and having to answer in French. Those who have heard, as I have heard, hundreds and hundreds of cases in Welsh Courts will appreciate the position.

== Provision ==
The Welsh Courts Act was passed on 22 October 1942, repealing King of England, Henry VIII's measures, allowing the use of the Welsh language in courts;

Whereas doubt has been entertained whether section seventeen of the statute 27 Hen. 8. c. 26 unduly restricts the right of Welsh speaking persons to use the Welsh language in courts of justice in Wales, now, therefore, the said section is hereby repealed, and it is hereby enacted that the Welsh language may be used in any court in Wales by any party or witness who considers that he would otherwise be at any disadvantage by reason of his natural language of communication being Welsh.

Section 2 of the Act is as follows;

The Lord Chancellor may make rules prescribing a translation in the Welsh language of any form for the time being prescribed by law as the form of any oath or affirmation to be administered and taken or made by any person in any court, and an oath or affirmation administered and taken or made in any court in Wales in the translation prescribed by such rules shall, without interpretation, be of the like effect as if it had been administered and taken or made in the English language.

Continued pressure and doubt about the impact of the legislation led to the David Hughes Parry report which reported in 1965 and led the creation of the Welsh Language Act 1967, which repealed section 1 of the Welsh Courts Act 1942. All four sections Act were repealed by the Welsh Language Act 1993 and ceased to have any effects.

== See also ==
- National Assembly for Wales (Official Languages) Act 2012
- Welsh Language (Wales) Measure 2011
