= National Assembly for Wales (Official Languages) Act 2012 =

- Act of the National Assembly for Wales
- National Assembly for Wales
- Long title: An Act of the National Assembly for Wales to make provision about the use of the English and Welsh languages in proceedings of the National Assembly for Wales and in the discharge of the functions of the Assembly Commission.
- Citation: 2012 anaw 1
- Introduced by: Rhodri Glyn Thomas
- Territorial extent: Wales

Dates
- Royal assent: 12 November 2012
- Commencement: 13 November 2012

Other legislation
- Relates to: Government of Wales Act 2006

Status: Current legislation

History of passage through the Assembly

Text of statute as originally enacted

Text of the National Assembly for Wales (Official Languages) Act 2012 as in force today (including any amendments) within the United Kingdom, from legislation.gov.uk.

The National Assembly for Wales (Official Languages) Act 2012 (anaw 1) (Welsh: Deddf Cynulliad Cenedlaethol Cymru (Ieithoedd Swyddogol) 2012) was an act of the then National Assembly for Wales placing a statutory duty on the National Assembly for Wales for the provision of bilingual services. The act was significant as the first act of law passed in Wales for over 600 years.

== Provision and significance ==
The National Assembly for Wales (Official Languages) Act 2012 was an act of the National Assembly for Wales that was given royal assent on 12 November 2012. It is significant in that it is the first statute passed in Wales to become law in over 600 years.

The act included amendments to the Government of Wales Act 2006 and placed a statutory duties on the then National Assembly for Wales and Assembly Commission for provision of bilingual services in Wales.

It was not the first bill passed by the National Assembly for Wales, which was the bill for the Local Government Byelaws (Wales) Act 2012, but was the first to receive royal assent and so become law. The bill was passed by the National Assembly for Wales on 3 October 2012, but then underwent a statutory period of intimation, so that lawyers could verify that it fell within the remit of the National Assembly for Wales. Royal assent was given when the Welsh Seal was affixed to the letters patent by First Minister Carwyn Jones on 12 November 2012; it was gazetted on 16 November.

Carwyn Jones said of the act during a short ceremony, "This is the first act that has been passed by a legislature in Wales for more than 600 years. It's an exceptionally historic day", he said. "Wales is an old country, but a young democracy. Today is a historic day for us as a nation. It heralds the beginning of a new era for the governance of Wales."

The letters patent were to be displayed at the National Assembly for Wales with all other future acts to be stored at the National Library of Wales, Aberystwyth.

== See also ==
- Welsh Courts Act 1942
- Welsh Language Act 1967
- Welsh Language Act 1993
- Welsh Language (Wales) Measure 2011
