= Welsh Language Board =

Welsh-language public body (1993–2012)

Bwrdd yr Iaith Gymraeg Welsh Language Board
- "Making it easier for everyone to use Welsh in all walks of life."
- Formation: December 1993
- Dissolved: 31 March 2012
- Type: Executive agency
- Legal status: Intergovernmental implementation body
- Purpose: Promotion of the Welsh language throughout Wales
- Headquarters: Cardiff, Carmarthen, and Caernarfon
- Region served: Wales
- Official language: Welsh
- Chief Executive: Meirion P. Jones
- Main organ: Board of directors
- Budget: No budget as such, though received an annual government grant of £12m
- Website: http://www.byig-wlb.org.uk/Pages/Hafan.aspx (Archived version.)

The Welsh Language Board (Welsh: Bwrdd yr Iaith Gymraeg) was a statutory body set up by HM Government under the Welsh Language Act 1993. It was an Assembly Sponsored Public Body. It began its life under John Walter Jones, and its last chief executive was Meirion Prys Jones, with Meri Huws acting as chair.

It received an annual government grant of £13m which was used to "promote and facilitate" the use of the Welsh language.

The board was responsible for administering the Welsh Language Act and for seeing that public bodies in Wales kept to its terms. Over 500 Welsh language schemes were agreed with a range of bodies named under the provisions of the act.

In cases where there were concerns that public bodies were not complying with their Welsh language schemes, the board could hold a statutory investigation. If the board's investigations indicated that an organisation has broken its own Welsh language scheme, it could produce recommendations to the organisation and, ultimately, refer the matter to the minister for heritage at the Welsh Assembly Government.

The board's private sector and business team worked with a wide variety of large and small companies. Since launching the private sector Welsh language policy in November 2008, over 100 businesses produced a policy, and 150 companies signed up to the Board's "Investing in Welsh scheme", indicating support for the language.

The Welsh Language Board was at the forefront of promoting bilingual design, in part by making annual bilingual awards. In 2006, winners included FBA, Glass Hammer, Synergy Creative Design & Marketing, Hoffi, 6721, Elfen, Zodshop and Departures.

In winter 2004 Rhodri Morgan, previous First Minister of Wales, announced his decision to abolish the Welsh Language Board. This decision evoked a mixed reaction throughout Wales: welcomed by Cymdeithas yr Iaith Gymraeg but met with scepticism by others. It was abolished on 31 March 2012 and replaced by the Welsh Language Commissioner: Meri Huws was the first commissioner. The board's powers were transferred to the Welsh Government and the commissioner.

== See also ==
- List of language regulators
- Languages in the United Kingdom
- Language policy
- Regional language
- Language revitalization
- Foras na Gaeilge – Irish language governing body
- Bòrd na Gàidhlig – Scottish Gaelic governing body
- Cornish Language Partnership – Cornish language governing body
