= Wales and Berwick Act 1746 =

Act of the Parliament of Great Britain

Wales and Berwick Act 1746 (Note: The citation of this act by this short title was authorised by section 1 of, and the first schedule to, the Short Titles Act 1896. Due to the repeal of those provisions it is now authorised by section 19(2) of the Interpretation Act 1978.)
- Act of Parliament
- Parliament of Great Britain
- Long title: An Act to enforce the Execution of an Act of this Session of Parliament, for granting to His Majesty several Rates and Duties upon Houses, Windows, or Lights.
- Citation: 20 Geo. 2. c. 42
- Territorial extent: Great Britain

Dates
- Royal assent: 17 June 1747
- Commencement: 18 November 1746 (Note: Start of session.)
- Repealed: 1 January 1979
Other legislation
Amended by	Welsh Language Act 1967
Repealed by	Interpretation Act 1978
Relates to	National Debt Act 1746; Local Government Act 1933; Local Government Act 1972

Status: Repealed

Text of statute as originally enacted

The Wales and Berwick Act 1746 (20 Geo. 2. c. 42) was an act of the Parliament of Great Britain that created a statutory definition of England as including England, Wales and Berwick-upon-Tweed.

The walled garrison town of Berwick changed hands numerous times before the crowns of England and Scotland were united in 1603.

== Provisions ==
The act created a statutory definition of England as including England, Wales and Berwick-upon-Tweed. This definition applied to all acts passed before and after the act's coming into force, unless a given act provided an alternative definition. According to Blackstone, the act "perhaps superfluously" made explicit what was previously implicit.

The town of Berwick was variously under the control of the English and Scottish crowns before the crowns were united in 1603.

Berwick had historically been a royal burgh in Scotland before the two kingdoms merged to form the Kingdom of Great Britain in 1707. The act confirmed that English and not Scottish law would apply to Berwick.

Of the original act's four sections, only section 3 related to Wales and Berwick; sections 1 and 2 regulated collection of window tax and section 4 permitted Quaker officials to replace the prescribed oath of fidelity with a declaration, owing to their objection to oath-taking. The short title 'Wales and Berwick Act 1746' was introduced after the other sections had been repealed; today it is authorised by the Short Titles Act 1896.

== Repeal ==
The act was repealed with regard to Wales by the Welsh Language Act 1967.

The whole act was repealed by section 25(1) of, and schedule 3 to, the Interpretation Act 1978, which came into force on 1 January 1979.

The Local Government Act 1972, which came into force on 1 April 1974, explicitly stated that in future legislation 'England' would consist of the 46 metropolitan and non-metropolitan counties established by the act (which included Berwick) and that 'Wales' would consist of the eight Welsh counties established by the act. This also had the effect of ending debate on whether Monmouthshire was a part of Wales, or of England. The administration of law had been attached to one of the English law circuits, Oxford, and the Local Government Act 1933 (23 & 24 Geo. 5. c. 51) had listed both Monmouthshire and the county borough of Newport as parts of England. The Interpretation Act 1978 restated the provisions of the Local Government Act 1972 with respect to legislation passed after 1 April 1974 and noted explicitly that in legislation enacted before then England included Berwick and Monmouthshire; and also that in legislation prior to 1967 it still included Wales.

== See also ==
- England and Wales
