= Laws in Wales Acts 1535 and 1542 =

Laws that incorporated Wales into England

Laws in Wales Act 1535 (Note: The citation of this act by this short title was authorised by section 5 of, and the second schedule to, the Statute Law Revision Act 1948. Due to the repeal of those provisions, it is now authorised by section 19(2) of the Interpretation Act 1978.)
- Act of Parliament
- Parliament of England
- Long title: An Act for Laws & Justice to be ministred in Wales in like fourme as it is in this Realme.
- Citation: 27 Hen. 8. c. 26
- Territorial extent: Wales, Marcher Lordships

Dates
- Royal assent: 14 April 1536
- Commencement: 4 February 1536 (Note: Start of session)
- Repealed: 21 December 1993
Other legislation
Amended by	Statute Law Revision Act 1887; Sheriffs Act 1887; Statute Law Revision Act 1888; Welsh Courts Act 1942
Repealed by	Welsh Language Act 1993
Relates to	Statute of Rhuddlan; Laws in Wales Act 1542

Status: Repealed

Text of statute as originally enacted

Revised text of statute as amended

Laws in Wales Act 1542
- Act of Parliament
- Parliament of England
- Long title: An Act for certaine Ordinaunces in the Kinges Majesties Domynion and Principalitie of Wales.
- Citation: 34 & 35 Hen. 8. c. 26
- Territorial extent: Wales, Marcher Lordships

Dates
- Royal assent: 12 May 1543
- Commencement: 3 November 1542 (Note: Start of session)
- Repealed: 3 January 1995
Other legislation
Amended by	Court of Marches of Wales Act 1688; Juries Act 1825; Statute Law Revision and Civil Procedure Act 1881; Statute Law Revision Act 1887; Sheriffs Act 1887; Coroners Act 1887; Theft Act 1968; Courts Act 1971
Repealed by	Statute Law (Repeals) Act 1969; Welsh Language Act 1993; Sale of Goods (Amendment) Act 1994
Relates to	Statute of Rhuddlan; Laws in Wales Act 1535

Status: Repealed

Text of statute as originally enacted

Revised text of statute as amended

The Laws in Wales Acts 1535 and 1542 (Welsh: Y Deddfau Cyfreithiau yng Nghymru 1535 a 1542), also called the Acts of Union (Welsh: Y Deddfau Uno), were acts of the Parliament of England under King Henry VIII causing Wales to be incorporated into the realm of the Kingdom of England.

The legal system of England and the norms of English administration, including the use of the English language only, were applied to a mainly Welsh-speaking Wales. This created a single state and legal jurisdiction, which is now called England and Wales.

In 1284, with the Statute of Rhuddlan, England had annexed Wales, which was excluded from parliamentary representation in Westminster. Wales was divided between the Principality of Wales and many feudal territories called the marcher Lordships, which were effectively unified under the laws. The English system of county government was also extended across all of Wales.

== Background ==
After Henry VIII made himself the head of the Church of England in 1534, Wales was seen as a potential problem. Some ambitious men unhappy with the penal laws against the Welsh in Wales were frustrated by legal complexities. Wales had also been the landing ground for Henry VII and was close to Catholic Ireland.

Thomas Cromwell, by 1534 principal secretary and chief minister to Henry VIII, brought forward Acts of Parliament to unify Wales with England. The first of these came in 1536 and was later strengthened by the Act of 1542/43. The two Acts aimed to integrate the legal, political, and administrative systems of Wales with England and to make English the language of the courts in Wales, which at the time was a mainly Welsh-speaking country. The preamble of the acts suggests that legal differences in Wales had led to discontent, which the king wished to end.

The acts were the result of a long process of assimilation. Wales had been annexed by England, following the conquest by Edward I, under the Statute of Rhuddlan of 1284.

== Acts ==
The two acts have the long titles An Act for Laws and Justice to be ministered in Wales in like Form as it is in this Realm and An Act for Certain Ordinances in the King's Majesty's Dominion and Principality of Wales. Together they are known as the Acts of Union. The aim of the acts were to incorporate Wales into the kingdom of England.

The acts were not popularly referred to as the "Acts of Union" until 1901, when historian Owen M. Edwards assigned them that name. This name is misleading and the legal short title of each act has since 1948 been "The Laws in Wales Act". They are also often seen cited by the years they received royal assent, 1536 and 1543 respectively, although the official citation uses the preceding years, as each of these acts was passed between 1 January and 25 March, at a time when New Year's Day fell on 25 March.

The act promulgated in 1535 was enacted in 1536, in the 8th session of Henry VIII's 5th parliament. which began on 4 February 1535/36, This was later repealed with effect from 21 December 1993. The act of 1542 was enacted in 1543, in the second session of Henry VIII's 8th parliament, which began on 22 January 1542/43.

=== Provisions ===
The act declared King Henry's intentions, namely that because of differences in law and language: (Note: The Laws in Wales Act 1535 (27 Hen. 8. c. 26))

- (4) some rude and ignorant People have made Distinction and Diversity between the King's Subjects of this Realm, and his Subjects of the said Dominion and Principality of Wales, whereby great Discord, Variance, Debate, Division, Murmur and Sedition hath grown between his said Subjects;
- (5) His Highness therefore of a singular Zeal, Love and Favour that he beareth towards his Subjects of his said Dominion of Wales, minding and intending to reduce them to the perfect Order, Notice and Knowledge of his Laws of this Realm, and utterly to extirp all and singular the sinister Usages and Customs differing from the same, and to bring the said Subjects of this his Realm, and of his said Dominion of Wales, to an amicable Concord and Unity...

– and therefore:

That his said Country or Dominion of Wales shall be, stand and continue for ever from henceforth incorporated, united and annexed to and with this his Realm of England;

The 1535 act imposed English law and the English language upon the Welsh people and allowed Welsh representation in the English parliament. These Acts also had many effects on the administration of Wales. The marcher lordships were abolished as political units, and five new counties were established on Welsh lands (Monmouthshire, Brecknockshire, Radnorshire, Montgomeryshire and Denbighshire), thus creating a Wales of 13 counties; Other areas of the lordships were annexed to Shropshire, Herefordshire, Gloucestershire, Glamorgan, Carmarthenshire, Pembrokeshire, Cardiganshire and Merionethshire; The borders of Wales for administrative/government purposes were established and have remained the same since; this was unintentional as Wales was to be incorporated fully into England, but the status of Monmouthshire was still ambiguous in the view of some people until confirmed by the Local Government Act 1972. Each county or shire consisted of fewer than a dozen hundreds corresponding with varying degrees of accuracy to the former commotes.

Wales elected members to the English (Westminster) Parliament, and the Council of Wales and the Marches was established on a legal basis. The Court of Great Sessions was established, a system peculiar to Wales, with a Sheriff appointed in every county, and other county officers as in England. The courts of the marcher lordships lost the power to try serious criminal cases, all courts in Wales were to be conducted in the English language, not Welsh, and the office of justice of the peace was introduced, nine to every county.

== Effects ==
In the Welsh Principality, assimilation had already been greatly implemented and so the 1536 and 1542/43 acts in reality brought some legal consistency across Wales, effectively extending the Principality to the Welsh Marches and ending use of Welsh law.

The legal simplicity made it easier for the English crown to collect tax in Wales. After the conquest of Wales by Edward I, the counties of Anglesey, Caernarfonshire, Cardiganshire, Carmarthenshire, Flintshire and Merionethshire were added to by the formerly Marcher counties of Brecknockshire, Denbighshire, Glamorgan, Montgomeryshire, Pembrokeshire and Radnorshire. This also formed a legal border with England.

Although the poor people of Wales may not have been aware of the laws, the measures were popular with the Welsh gentry who saw the acts as bringing legal equality with English citizens. The acts were also seen by the gentry as reducing the influence of the marcher lords.

English was made the legal language in Wales to bring it in line with Westminster. Welsh remained unchallenged as the majority language of the land until the later 19th century.

== Bibliography ==
- Davies, John (1990). A History of Wales. London: Penguin 1994. ISBN 0-14-014581-8.
- Gower, Jon (2013). The Story of Wales. BBC Books. ISBN 978-1-8499-0373-8.
- Johnes, Martin (2019). Wales: England's Colony?: The Conquest, Assimilation and Re-creation of Wales. Parthian. ISBN 978-1-912681-41-9.
- Williams, Glanmor (1993). Renewal and reformation: Wales, c.1415–1642. Oxford: Oxford University Press. ISBN 0-19-285277-9.
- Williams, W. Ogwen (1971), "The union of England and Wales". In A. J. Roderick (Ed.), Wales through the ages: volume II, Modern Wales, from 1485 to the beginning of the 20th century, pp. 16–23. Llandybïe : Christopher Davies (Publishers) Ltd. ISBN 0-7154-0292-7.
