= Welsh Language Act 1993 =

Act of the Parliament of the United Kingdom

Welsh Language Act 1993 (Note: Section 37.)
- Act of Parliament
- Parliament of the United Kingdom
- Long title: An Act to establish a Board having the function of promoting and facilitating the use of the Welsh language, to provide for the preparation by public bodies of schemes giving effect to the principle that in the conduct of public business and the administration of justice in Wales the English and Welsh languages should be treated on a basis of equality, to make further provision relating to the Welsh language, to repeal certain spent enactments relating to Wales, and for connected purposes.
- Citation: 1993 c. 38
- Territorial extent: United Kingdom

Dates
- Royal assent: 21 October 1993
- Commencement: various (Note: 21 October 1993) (Note: Section 36.)

Other legislation
- Amends: House of Commons Disqualification Act 1975; Representation of the People Act 1985
- Repeals/revokes: Laws in Wales Act 1535; Laws in Wales Act 1542; Welsh Courts Act 1942; Welsh Language Act 1967
- Amended by: European Parliamentary Elections Act 2002; National Health Service (Consequential Provisions) Act 2006; Charities Act 2011; Welsh Language (Wales) Measure 2011; Co-operative and Community Benefit Societies Act 2014

Status: Amended

Text of statute as originally enacted

Revised text of statute as amended

Text of the Welsh Language Act 1993 as in force today (including any amendments) within the United Kingdom, from legislation.gov.uk.

The Welsh Language Act 1993 (c. 38) (Welsh: Deddf yr Iaith Gymraeg 1993) is an act of the Parliament of the United Kingdom, which put the Welsh language on an equal footing with the English language in Wales.

== Act ==
=== Background ===
After the Welsh language channel was founded in 1982 and the recognition of Welsh as a core and compulsory subject in the National curriculum, the Welsh Language Act 1993 aimed to treat Welsh and English equally in public business and justice.

=== Provision ===
The Welsh Language Act 1993 in summary brought about principle of equality of Welsh and English in public services and justice in Wales.

The Welsh Language Act 1993 (the 1993 act) formed the Welsh Language Board and brought some public bodies to use the principle of treating English and Welsh equally where practical and reasonable. The act made it mandatory for public service bodies in Wales to use a Welsh language scheme for use of Welsh in service, after notification to do so from the Welsh Language Board. The Welsh Language Board would then be able to approve schemes, give guidance and monitor compliance with schemes.

Devolution has been described as providing impetus for having legal bilingualism with the then National Assembly for Wales itself required by the act to provide bilingual legislation. The 1993 act reiterates section one of the Welsh Language Act 1967 on a right to speak Welsh in legal proceedings in Wales. The act also allowed Welsh Ministers to provide a Welsh name to a body, office or place named in legislation. Welsh Ministers would also be able to prescribe Welsh versions of certain documents.

=== Today ===
A significant amount of the act remains active and the Welsh Language Commissioner has now replaced the Welsh Language Board.

== Impact ==
Since the 1993 act, all new and replaced road signs in Wales as well as public information signs on and in buildings owned by local government bodies are legally required to be bilingual. Bilingual signs have been described as a material symbol of Welshness.

The act has had some success, but there were certain areas within the legal provision that need to be strengthened according to Aberystwyth University lecturer, Catrin Huws.

Cardiff University identified five key areas that were lacking in the provisions brought about by the 1993 Act by 2008. These were;

- Lack of capacity and resources of organisations to provide Welsh services
- Lack of support from managers
- Inconsistent meeting of deadlines for remedial action
- Lack of organisation discussion on objectives
- Inadequate monitoring and updating of using schemes

The Irish Official Languages Act 2003 and the Gaelic Language (Scotland) Act 2005 have been closely based on the Welsh Language Act 1993.

== See also ==
=== Wales ===
- Welsh Courts Act 1942
- Welsh Language Act 1967
- National Assembly for Wales (Official Languages) Act 2012
- Welsh Language (Wales) Measure 2011

=== Other ===
- Irish Language Act (Northern Ireland)
- Gaelic Language (Scotland) Act 2005
- Official Languages Act 2003 (Republic of Ireland)
