= Welsh Language Act 1967 =

Act of the Parliament of the United Kingdom

Welsh Language Act 1967 (Note: Section 5(1).)
- Act of Parliament
- Parliament of the United Kingdom
- Long title: An Act to make further provision with respect to the Welsh language and references in Acts of Parliament to Wales.
- Citation: 1967 c. 66
- Territorial extent: United Kingdom

Dates
- Royal assent: 27 July 1967
- Commencement: 27 July 1967 (Note: The Acts of Parliament (Commencement) Act 1793.)
- Repealed: 21 December 1993
Other legislation
Amends	Wales and Berwick Act 1746; Welsh Courts Act 1942; Pensions Appeal Tribunals Act 1943
Amended by	Interpretation Act 1978
Repealed by	Welsh Language Act 1993

Status: Repealed

Text of statute as originally enacted

Revised text of statute as amended

The Welsh Language Act 1967 (c. 66) (Welsh: Deddf yr Iaith Gymraeg 1967) was an act of the Parliament of the United Kingdom, which gave some rights to use the Welsh language in legal proceedings in Wales (including Monmouthshire) and gave the relevant minister the right to authorise the production of a Welsh version of any documents required or allowed by the Act. The act repealed, for the purposes of future enactments, a part of the Wales and Berwick Act 1746, which defined England as including Wales.

Passed in July 1967, the act was based on the 1965 Hughes Parry Report and campaigns by the Welsh Language Society and members of Plaid Cymru, although following its passage some campaigners argued it did not go far enough. The act was the first act to significantly improve the rights to use Welsh in legal proceedings and started to remove the ban imposed on the language in law courts and other public administration since the 16th century in favour of English.

The act was superseded by the Welsh Language Act 1993.

== Act ==
The Welsh Language Act 1967 allowed the Welsh language to be used in legal proceeding in Wales, which had previously been banned for centuries. The act allowed government ministers to authorise Welsh translations of any documents required by the act. Although the act gave the Welsh language equal status, it did not give it official status.

The act also repealed a part of the Wales and Berwick Act 1746, that had previously defined "England" to include Wales, though the change only applied to future enactments, so it did not change the meaning of existing enactments. The legal definition of the territory of Wales was later defined by the combined area of Welsh counties under section 20 of Local Government Act 1972. The counties were reorganised by the Local Government (Wales) Act 1994 but the territorial definition of Wales remained unchanged.

== History ==
The Welsh Language Act 1967 was partly based on the Hughes Parry Report of 1965, although the act did not include all of the recommendations of the report. The report supported equal importance and significance of Welsh and English in the courts in Wales verbally and in writing.

The Laws in Wales Acts 1535–1542 had made English the only language of the law courts and other aspects of public administration in Wales. This disregarded the majority Welsh-speaking population of Wales; In the 16th and 17th centuries only a few in Wales could fully understand English. It was not until industrialisation, which was described as having led to a system discouraging the use of Welsh as "their natural and native tongue", that the situation changed.

While the Welsh Courts Act 1942 was the first legislation since the 16th century allowing some rights to use Welsh in legal proceedings, such rights were only exercised if it could be proved that using English would be disadvantageous, and depended on the availability of a sufficiently fluent Welsh-speaking judge or magistrate. The 1967 Act was the first act to remove restrictions on the Welsh language, and was a response to campaigns by members of Plaid Cymru and the Welsh Language Society. Following its passing, some "more militant" Welsh language campaigners were not pleased with the act, describing it as "toothless", with some launching an "aggressive and virulent campaign of protest", leading to the burning of cottages and the defacing of English-language signage with paint.

The 1967 act was superseded by the Welsh Language Act 1993, which introduced equal treatment of Welsh and English in "public business and the administration of justice in Wales".

== See also ==
- Welsh Courts Act 1942
- Welsh Language Act 1993
- National Assembly for Wales (Official Languages) Act 2012
- Welsh Language (Wales) Measure 2011
