= Devolution in the United Kingdom =

Transfer of powers to parts of the UK

Labelled map of the varying levels of devolution in the United Kingdom as of 2026.

In the United Kingdom, devolution (historically called home rule in Scotland, Wales and Northern Ireland) is the Parliament of the United Kingdom's statutory granting of a greater level of self-government to three countries of the United Kingdom – Scotland, Wales and Northern Ireland, and to the subdivisions of England, specifically to strategic authorities.

Law-making powers have been granted to the Scottish Parliament, the Senedd (Welsh Parliament), and the Northern Ireland Assembly, with authority exercised by their associated executive governments: the Scottish Government, Welsh Government, and Northern Ireland Executive respectively. In England, devolved powers, functions, and responsibilities have been granted to strategic authorities throughout England. There have been other proposals for devolution in England, including national devolution, regional devolution (such as to northern England or Cornwall) or failed proposals for regional assemblies. The term "devolution" initially referred to only the law-making powers awarded to Scotland, Wales and Northern Ireland, but was expanded to also include the restructuring of non-legislative powers within England.

Devolution differs from federalism in that the devolved powers of the subnational authority ultimately reside in central government, thus the state remains, de jure, a unitary state. Legislation creating devolved parliaments or assemblies can be repealed or amended by parliament in the same way as any statute, although the parliaments and assemblies in Scotland, Wales, Northern Ireland and London were supported by public referendums. Laws such as the Scotland Act 2016 and Wales Act 2017 affirmed the permanence of their devolved institutions, and any abolishment of such must be voted for in a referendum.

Legislation passed following the EU membership referendum, including the United Kingdom Internal Market Act 2020, restricts the authority of the devolved legislatures in Scotland, Wales, and Northern Ireland.

== Northern Ireland ==
Map of Northern Ireland within the United Kingdom

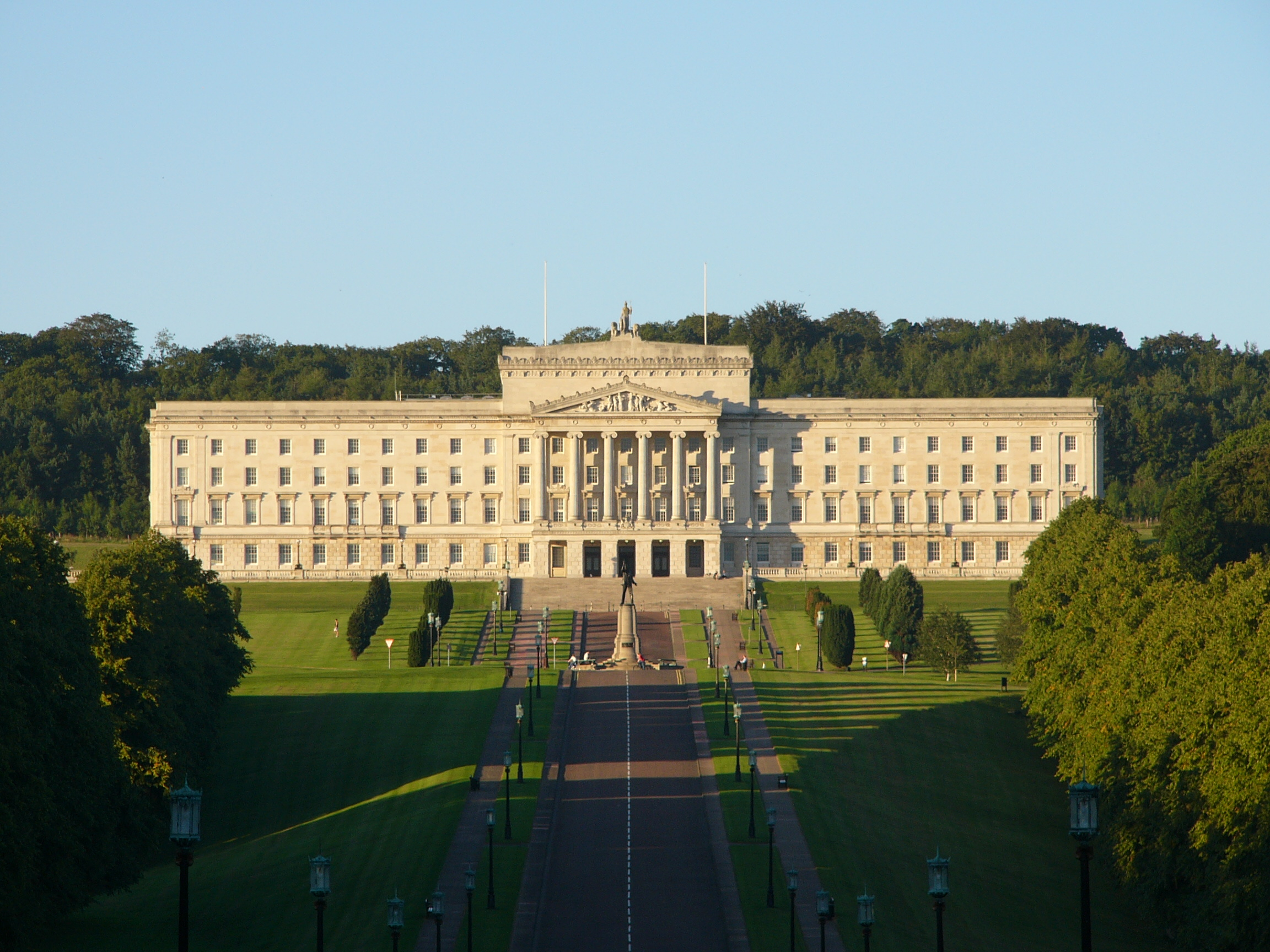
Stormont Parliament Building, home of the Northern Ireland Assembly

Northern Ireland was the first constituent of the UK to have a devolved administration. (Note: Following the Anglo-Irish Treaty that provided (among other matters) for the partition of Ireland, the Irish Free State left the UK at the same time, initially as a dominion of the British Empire (like Australia, Canada, New Zealand and South Africa), subsequently to become an independent republic.) Home Rule came into effect for Northern Ireland in 1921, under the Government of Ireland Act 1920 ("Fourth Home Rule Act"). The Parliament of Northern Ireland established under that act was prorogued (the session ended) on 30 March 1972 owing to the destabilisation of Northern Ireland upon the onset of the Troubles in late 1960s. This followed escalating violence by state and paramilitary organisations following the suppression of civil rights demands by Northern Ireland Catholics.

The Northern Ireland Parliament was abolished by the Northern Ireland Constitution Act 1973, which received royal assent on 19 July 1973. A Northern Ireland Assembly was elected on 28 June 1973 and following the Sunningdale Agreement, a power-sharing Northern Ireland Executive was formed on 1 January 1974. This collapsed on 28 May 1974, due to the Ulster Workers' Council strike.

The Northern Ireland Constitutional Convention (1975–1976) and second Northern Ireland Assembly (1982–1986) were unsuccessful at restoring devolution. In the absence of devolution and power-sharing, the UK Government and Irish Government formally agreed to co-operate on security, justice and political progress in the Anglo-Irish Agreement, signed on 15 November 1985. More progress was made after the ceasefires by the Provisional IRA in 1994 and 1997.

The 1998 Belfast Agreement (also known as the Good Friday Agreement), resulted in the creation of a new Northern Ireland Assembly, intended to bring together the two communities (nationalist and unionist) to govern Northern Ireland. Additionally, renewed devolution in Northern Ireland was conditional on co-operation between the newly established Northern Ireland Executive and the Government of Ireland through a new all-Ireland body, the North/South Ministerial Council. A British–Irish Council covering the whole British Isles and a British–Irish Intergovernmental Conference (between the British and Irish Governments) were also established.

From 15 October 2002 the Northern Ireland Assembly was suspended due to a breakdown in the Northern Ireland peace process but, on 13 October 2006, the British and Irish governments announced the St Andrews Agreement, a 'road map' to restore devolution to Northern Ireland. On 26 March 2007, Democratic Unionist Party (DUP) leader Ian Paisley met Sinn Féin leader Gerry Adams for the first time and together announced that a devolved government would be returning to Northern Ireland. The Executive was restored on 8 May 2007. Several policing and justice powers were transferred to the Assembly on 12 April 2010.

The 2007–2011 Assembly (the third since the 1998 Agreement) was dissolved on 24 March 2011 in preparation for an election to be held on Thursday 5 May 2011, this being the first Assembly since the Good Friday Agreement to complete a full term. The fifth Assembly convened in May 2016. That assembly dissolved on 26 January 2017, and an election for a reduced Assembly was held on 2 March 2017 but this did not lead to formation of a new Executive due to the collapse of power-sharing. Power-sharing collapsed in Northern Ireland due to the Renewable Heat Incentive scandal. On 11 January 2020, after having been suspended for almost three years, the parties reconvened on the basis of an agreement proposed by the Irish and UK governments. Elections were held for a seventh assembly in May 2022. Sinn Féin emerged as the largest party, followed by the Democratic Unionist Party. The newly elected assembly met for the first time on 13 May 2022 and again on 30 May. However, at both these meetings, the DUP refused to assent to the election of a speaker as part of a protest against the Northern Ireland Protocol, which meant that the assembly could not continue other business, including the appointment of a new Executive. On 3 February 2024, a new executive was formed marking the return of devolved government to Northern Ireland.

== Scotland ==
Map of Scotland within the United Kingdom

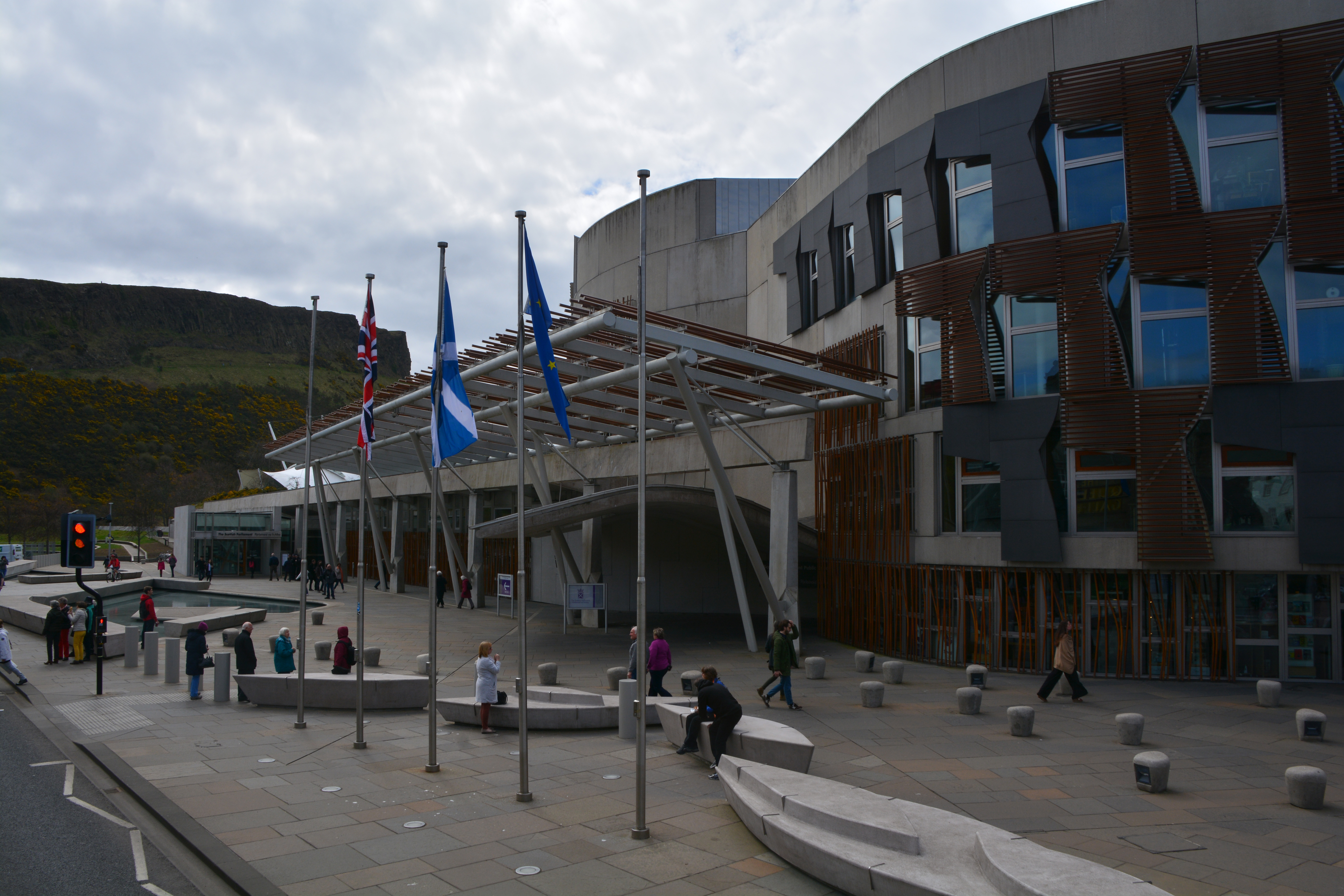
Scottish Parliament Building, Edinburgh

The Acts of Union 1707 merged the Parliament of Scotland and the Parliament of England into a single Parliament of Great Britain. Ever since, individuals and organisations advocated the return of a Scottish Parliament. The drive for home rule for Scotland first took concrete shape in the 19th century, as demands for home rule in Ireland were met with similar (although not as widespread) demands in Scotland. The National Association for the Vindication of Scottish Rights was established in 1853, a body close to the Scottish Unionist Party and motivated by a desire to secure more focus on Scottish problems in response to what they felt was undue attention being focused on Ireland by the then Liberal government. In 1871, William Ewart Gladstone stated at a meeting held in Aberdeen that if Ireland was to be granted home rule, then the same should apply to Scotland. A Scottish home rule bill was presented to the Westminster Parliament in 1913 but the legislative process was interrupted by the First World War.

The demands for political change in the way in which Scotland was run changed dramatically in the 1920s when Scottish nationalists started to form various organisations. The Scots National League was formed in 1920 in favour of Scottish independence, and this movement was superseded in 1928 by the formation of the National Party of Scotland, which became the Scottish National Party (SNP) in 1934. At first the SNP sought only the establishment of a devolved Scottish assembly, but in 1942 they changed this to support all-out independence. This caused the resignation of John MacCormick from the SNP and he formed the Scottish Covenant Association. This body proved to be the biggest mover in favour of the formation of a Scottish assembly, collecting over two million signatures in the late 1940s and early 1950s and attracting support from across the political spectrum. However, without formal links to any of the political parties it withered, and devolution and the establishment of an assembly were put on the political back burner.

Harold Wilson's Labour government set up a Royal Commission on the Constitution in 1969, which reported in 1973 to Edward Heath's Conservative government. The Commission recommended the formation of a devolved Scottish assembly, but this was not implemented. Support for the SNP reached 30% in the October 1974 general election, with 11 SNP MPs being elected. In 1978 the Labour government passed the Scotland Act which legislated for the establishment of a Scottish Assembly, provided the Scots voted for such in a referendum. However, the Labour Party was bitterly divided on the subject of devolution. An amendment to the Scotland Act that had been proposed by Labour MP George Cunningham, who shortly afterwards defected to the newly formed Social Democratic Party (SDP), required 40% of the total electorate to vote in favour of an assembly. Despite officially favouring it, considerable numbers of Labour members opposed the establishment of an assembly. This division contributed to only a narrow 'Yes' majority being obtained, and the failure to reach Cunningham's 40% threshold. The 18 years of Conservative government, under Margaret Thatcher and then John Major, saw strong resistance to any proposal for devolution for Scotland, and for Wales.

In response to Conservative dominance, in 1989 the Scottish Constitutional Convention was formed encompassing the Labour Party, Liberal Democrats and the Scottish Green Party, local authorities, and sections of "civic Scotland" like Scottish Trades Union Congress, the Small Business Federation and Church of Scotland and the other major churches in Scotland. Its purpose was to devise a scheme for the formation of a devolution settlement for Scotland. The SNP decided to withdraw, as independence was not a constitutional option countenanced by the convention. The convention produced its final report in 1995. In May 1997, the Labour government of Tony Blair was elected with a promise of creating devolved institutions in Scotland. In late 1997, a referendum was held which resulted in a "yes" vote.

The newly created Scottish Parliament (as a result of the Scotland Act 1998) has powers to make primary legislation in all areas of policy which are not expressly 'reserved' for the UK Government and parliament such as national defence and international affairs. 76% of Scotland's revenue and 36% of its spending are 'reserved'. Devolution for Scotland was justified on the basis that it would make government more representative of the people of Scotland. It was argued that the population of Scotland felt detached from the Westminster government (largely because of the policies of the Conservative governments led by Margaret Thatcher and John Major). Critics however point out that the Scottish Parliament's power is on most measures surpassed by the parliaments of regions or provinces within federations, where regional and national parliaments are each sovereign within their spheres of jurisdiction.

A referendum on Scottish independence was held on 18 September 2014, with the referendum being defeated 55.3% (No) to 44.7% (Yes). In the 2015 general election the SNP won 56 of the 59 Scottish seats with 50% of all Scottish votes. This saw the SNP replace the Liberal Democrats as the third largest in the UK Parliament. In the 2016 Scottish Parliament election the SNP fell two seats short of an overall majority with 63 seats but remained in government for a third term. The proportional electoral system used for Holyrood elections makes it very difficult for any party to gain a majority. The Scottish Conservatives won 31 seats and became the second largest party for the first time. Scottish Labour, down to 24 seats from 38, fell to third place. The Scottish Greens took 6 seats and overtook the Liberal Democrats who remained flat at 5 seats. Following the 2016 referendum on EU membership, where Scotland and Northern Ireland voted to Remain and England and Wales voted to Leave (leading to a 52% Leave vote nationwide), the Scottish Parliament voted for a second independence referendum to be held once conditions of the UK's EU exit are known.

The SNP had advocated for another independence referendum to be held in 2020. The SNP were widely expected to include a second independence referendum in their manifesto for the 2021 Scottish Parliament election. Senior SNP figures have said that a second independence referendum would be inevitable, should an SNP majority be elected to the Scottish Parliament in 2021 and some claimed this was going to happen by the end of 2021, though that hasn't been the case.

The United Kingdom Internal Market Act 2020 restricts and undermines the authority of the Scottish Parliament; a primary purpose of the act is to constrain the capacity of the devolved institutions to use their regulatory autonomy. It restricts the ability of the Scottish government to make different economic or social choices from those made in Westminster.

== Wales ==
Map of Wales within the United Kingdom

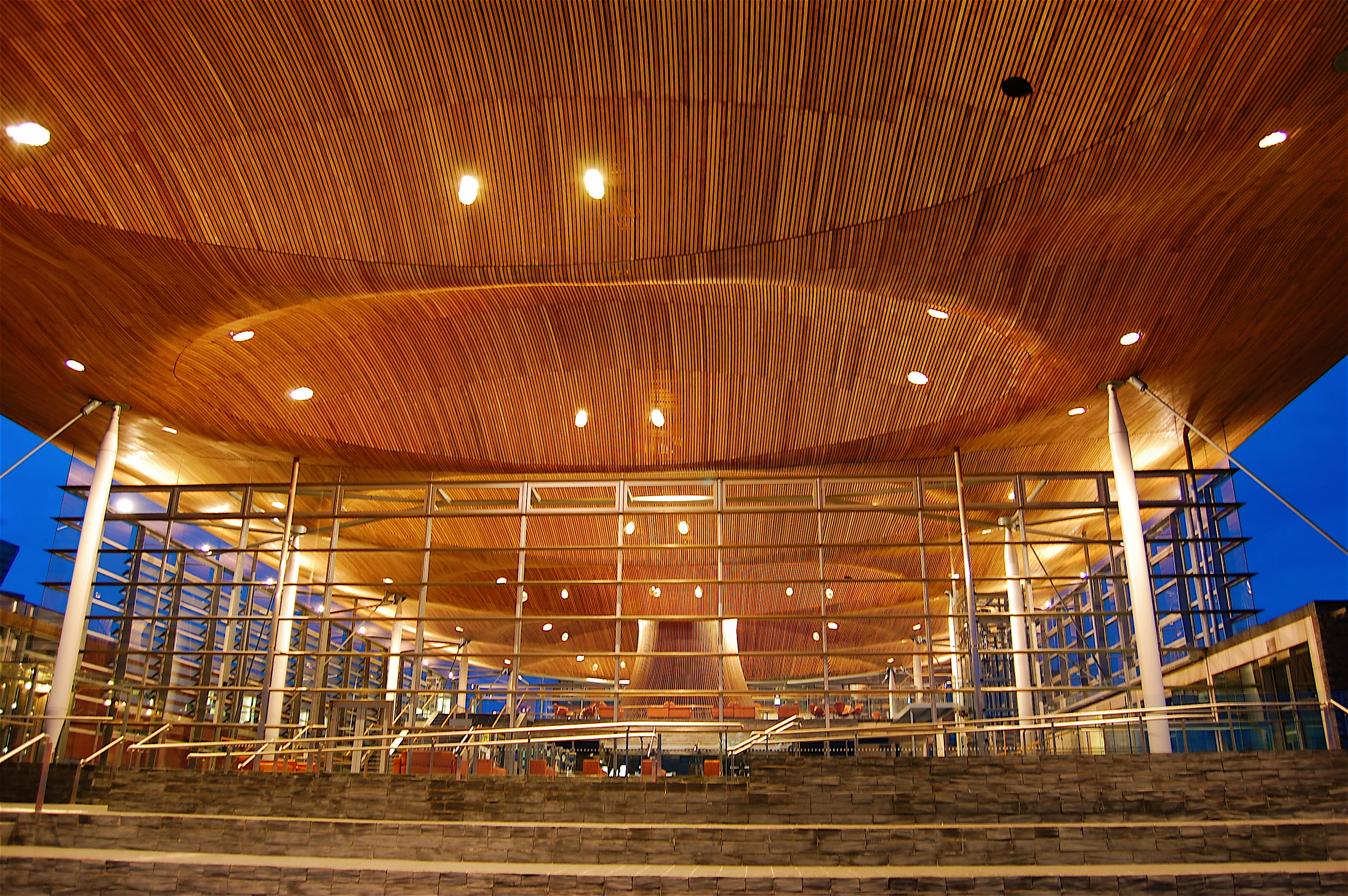
The Senedd, home to the Welsh Parliament

Following the Laws in Wales Acts 1535–1542, Wales was treated in legal terms as part of England. However, during the later part of the 19th century and early part of the 20th century the notion of a distinctive Welsh polity gained credence. In 1881 the Sunday Closing (Wales) Act 1881 was passed, the first such legislation exclusively concerned with Wales. The Central Welsh Board was established in 1896 to inspect the grammar schools set up under the Welsh Intermediate Education Act 1889, and a separate Welsh Department of the Board of Education was formed in 1907. The Agricultural Council for Wales was set up in 1912, and the Ministry of Agriculture and Fisheries had its own Welsh Office from 1919.

Despite the failure of popular political movements such as Cymru Fydd, a number of national institutions, such as the National Eisteddfod (1861), the Football Association of Wales (1876), the Welsh Rugby Union (1881), the University of Wales (Welsh: Prifysgol Cymru, 1893), the National Library of Wales (Llyfrgell Genedlaethol Cymru, 1911) and the Welsh Guards (Gwarchodlu Cymreig, 1915) were created. The campaign for disestablishment of the Anglican Church in Wales, achieved by the passage of the Welsh Church Act 1914, was also significant in the development of Welsh political consciousness. Plaid Cymru, a party committed to Welsh independence, was formed in 1925.

An appointed Council for Wales and Monmouthshire was established in 1949 to "ensure the government is adequately informed of the impact of government activities on the general life of the people of Wales". The council had 27 members nominated by local authorities in Wales, the University of Wales, National Eisteddfod Council and the Welsh Tourist Board. A cross-party Parliament for Wales campaign in the early 1950s was supported by a number of Labour MPs, mainly from the more Welsh-speaking areas, together with the Liberal Party and Plaid Cymru. A post of Minister of Welsh Affairs was created in 1951 and the post of Secretary of State for Wales and the Welsh Office were established in 1964 leading to the abolition of the Council for Wales and Monmouthshire.

Labour's incremental embrace of a distinctive Welsh polity was arguably catalysed in 1966 when Plaid Cymru president Gwynfor Evans won the Carmarthen by-election. In response to the emergence of Plaid Cymru and the Scottish National Party (SNP) Harold Wilson's Labour Government set up the Royal Commission on the Constitution (the Kilbrandon Commission) to investigate the UK's constitutional arrangements in 1969. The 1974–1979 Labour government proposed a Welsh Assembly in parallel to its proposals for Scotland. These were rejected by voters in the 1979 referendum: 956,330 votes against, 243,048 for.

In May 1997, the Labour government of Tony Blair was elected with a promise of creating a devolved assembly in Wales; the referendum in 1997 resulted in a narrow "yes" vote. The turnout was 50.22% with 559,419 votes (50.3%) in favour and 552,698 (49.7%) against, a majority of 6,721 (0.6%). The National Assembly for Wales, as a consequence of the Government of Wales Act 1998, possesses the power to determine how the government budget for Wales is spent and administered. The 1998 Act was followed by the Government of Wales Act 2006 which created an executive body, the Welsh Government, separate from the legislature, the National Assembly for Wales. It also conferred on the National Assembly some limited legislative powers.

The 1997 devolution referendum was only narrowly passed, with the majority of voters in the former industrial areas of the South Wales Valleys and the Welsh-speaking heartlands of West Wales and North Wales voting for devolution, and the majority of voters in all the counties near England, plus Cardiff and Pembrokeshire, rejecting devolution. However, all recent opinion polls indicate an increasing level of support for further devolution, with support for some tax varying powers now commanding a majority, and diminishing support for the abolition of the Assembly.

The 2011 Welsh devolution referendum saw a majority of 21 local authority constituencies to 1 voting in favour of more legislative powers being transferred from the UK parliament in Westminster to the Welsh Assembly. The turnout in Wales was 35.4% with 517,132 votes (63.5%) in favour and 297,380 (36.5%) against increased legislative power.

A Commission on Devolution in Wales was set up in October 2011 to consider further devolution of powers from London. The commission issued a report on the devolution of fiscal powers in November 2012 and a report on the devolution of legislative powers in March 2014. The fiscal recommendations formed the basis of the Wales Act 2014, while the majority of the legislative recommendations were put into law by the Wales Act 2017.

On 6 May 2020, the National Assembly was renamed Senedd Cymru or the Welsh Parliament with the Senedd becoming its common name in both languages.

The devolved competence of the Welsh Government, as the Scottish Government, is restricted and undermined by the United Kingdom Internal Market Act 2020.

There are also local collaborative bodies between local authorities in Wales. The Local Government and Elections (Wales) Act 2021 established four regional Corporate Joint Committees (CJCs) throughout Wales. Each CJC is led by a board of leaders from principal councils and national park authorities within its area. Corporate Joint Committees utilise the powers of its member principal councils, relating to economic well-being, strategic planning and regional transport. They are corporate bodies which can employ staff, hold assets and have dedicated budgets just like one of its member councils would. Each CJC area is subject to a city deal or growth deal.

== England ==
Unlike Northern Ireland, Scotland and Wales, England does not have its own devolved legislature or government and so is entirely subject to the administration of the UK Government and Parliament in Westminster.

=== Sub-national level ===
England within the United Kingdom

Strategic authorities in England

Sub-national devolution in England is to the strategic authorities rather than England as a whole. This devolution has come about since 2000 under several different laws.

Sub-national devolution was first introduced to the Greater London Authority in 2000, followed by the combined authorities and combined county authorities in 2010s and 2020s. Under the English Devolution and Community Empowerment Act 2026, they were all collectively designated as strategic authorities.

As of June 2026, there are 20 strategic authorities, 14 of which have a directly elected mayor. The powers given to the strategic authorities are more limited than the powers of the devolved national governments; they are limited largely to the economy, transport, and planning.

In October 2024, the newly elected Labour government established a UK wide Council of the Nations and Regions and an England-only Mayoral Council for England bringing together ministers from the UK government and strategic authority mayors. As the Labour government hopes that strategic authorities will be established throughout England, the Mayoral Council would eventually evolve into an all-England forum.

== Competences of the devolved authorities ==
Northern Ireland, Scotland and Wales enjoy different levels of legislative, administrative and budgetary autonomy. Each devolved administration has exclusive powers in certain policy areas, while in others, responsibility is shared and some areas of policy in the specific area are not under the control of the devolved administration. For example, while policing and criminal law may be a competence of the Scottish Government, the UK Government remains responsible for anti-terrorism, and coordinates serious crime response through the National Crime Agency.

Under section 30 of the Scotland Act 1998, powers that are reserved to the UK Parliament can be temporarily devolved to the Scottish Parliament. A section 30 order has been granted 16 times since the creation of the Scottish Parliament; these orders have covered a variety of areas, including the power to hold a referendum on independence.

However, section 35 of the Scotland Act 1998 grants the Secretary of State for Scotland the ability to make an order prohibiting the Presiding Officer of the Scottish Parliament from submitting a bill to royal assent if they believe it would be incompatible with any of the United Kingdom's international obligations or the interests of defence or national security, or would make modifications of the law as it applies to reserved matters and which the Secretary of State has reasonable grounds to believe would have an adverse effect on the operation of the law as it applies to reserved matters. This power was used for the first time in January 2023, when Scotland Secretary Alister Jack announced that he would make an order under section 35 to prevent the Gender Recognition Reform (Scotland) Bill from proceeding to royal assent.

The competences of the strategic authorities in England are set out in section 2 of the English Devolution and Community Empowerment Act 2026, with established mayoral authorities able to request more powers under section 53.

== Opposition to devolution ==
Opposition to devolution in the United Kingdom has taken different forms over time. Historically, anti-devolution sentiment was stronger in both major parties of the United Kingdom, the Conservative Party and the Labour Party, but after 1999 with the founding of the Scottish Parliament, the Senedd (Welsh Parliament), and the Northern Ireland Assembly, support for devolution has become dominant with anti-devolution parties being relatively minor. In the 1970s, plans for devolution failed until elections to new legislatures in 1999.

== See also ==
- List of current heads of government in the United Kingdom and dependencies
- British national identity – State or quality of embodying British characteristics
- Federalism in the United Kingdom – Proposed constitutional reform of a division of powers
- Intergovernmental relations in the United Kingdom – UK central and devolved body relations
- Unionism in the United Kingdom – Support for continued unity of the UK
- Scottish devolution – Transfer of powers to Scotland
- Welsh devolution – Transfer of powers to Wales
- Welsh independence – Welsh political philosophy
- Devolution in England – Transfer of powers to the subdivisions of England
- Outsourcing – Contracting internal tasks to an external organization
- Constitutional status of Cornwall
- Constitutional status of Orkney, Shetland and the Western Isles – Status of the Scottish islands
- Barnett formula – Public spending distribution to the devolved administrations in the UK
- Devolved, reserved and excepted matters – UK public policy areas
- Asymmetric federalism – Imbalance of powers as between members
- Crown Dependencies – Self-governing possessions of the British Crown
