= 1997 Welsh devolution referendum =

Pre-legislative referendum in Wales

- 18 September 1997
- Do you agree that there should be a Welsh Assembly as proposed by the Government?
- Outcome: The Government of Wales Act 1998 passes and the National Assembly for Wales is formed.

Results
Choice	Votes	%
Yes	559,419	50.30%
No	552,698	49.70%
Valid votes	1,112,117	99.64%
Invalid or blank votes	3,999	0.36%
Total votes	1,116,116	100.00%
Registered voters/turnout	2,222,533	50.22%
- Results by unitary authorities
- Saturation of colour reflects the strength of the vote.

The 1997 Welsh devolution referendum was a pre-legislative referendum held in Wales on 18 September 1997 over whether there was support for the creation of a National Assembly for Wales, and therefore a degree of self-government. The referendum was a Labour manifesto commitment and was held in their first term after the 1997 election under the provisions of the Referendums (Scotland and Wales) Act 1997. This was the second referendum held in Wales over the question of devolution: the first referendum was held in 1979 and was defeated by a large majority.

The referendum resulted in a narrow majority in favour, which led to the passing of the Government of Wales Act 1998 and the formation of the National Assembly for Wales in 1999.

== Background ==
A referendum was held in 1979 (with a parallel referendum in Scotland) proposing the creation of a Welsh Assembly, under James Callaghan's Labour government. The referendum stipulated that a Welsh Assembly would be created if supported by 50% of votes cast and 40% of the total electorate. The Scottish referendum achieved the first condition but not the second, while the Welsh referendum was defeated by almost a 4:1 majority. Indeed, although the Labour Party had committed itself to devolution in 1974 (following the advice of the Royal Commission on the Constitution) several Welsh Labour MPs (including Neil Kinnock) were very much opposed.

The 1979 referendum had been such a resounding defeat that it killed off any prospects of devolution in Wales for a generation. The almost wholly anti-devolution, unionist Conservative Party won the 1979 general election (though Welsh Labour remained the largest party in Wales, the Conservatives only won 11 out of 36 seats in Wales) and remained in government until 1997. Over this time, the Conservative Party became increasingly unpopular in Wales. The Conservatives mostly appointed English MPs representing English constituencies to the post of Secretary of State for Wales, including William Hague and John Redwood.)

A commitment to the creation of a Welsh Assembly with executive powers was again put into the Labour Party manifesto for the 1992 general election. The Labour Party shaped its policy of a Welsh Assembly under the guidance of Shadow Welsh Secretary Ron Davies and Welsh Office spokesmen Win Griffiths and Rhodri Morgan. In March 1996, Ron Davies signed an agreement with Alex Carlile, the Leader of the Welsh Liberal Democrats, which committed both parties to support a "Yes" vote in a Welsh devolution referendum in the event of a Labour victory at the 1997 general election. The agreement was made in the context of a potential Lib-Lab pact should Labour not win an overall majority.

There was no inter-party Constitutional Convention in Wales to define devolution as there had been in Scotland. Labour's initial proposal to elect a Welsh Assembly using the traditional first-past-the-post system was reversed in late-1996 in favour of the Additional-member system. This change was vital in order to gain the support of Plaid Cymru and the Welsh Liberal Democrats in the event of a referendum.

== Referendum question ==
Unusually for a referendum just as in the 1997 Scottish devolution referendum the electorate was asked to vote on two statements rather than a question which corresponded to the following proposal. The statements were issued both in English and Welsh.

Parliament has decided to consult people in Wales on the Government's proposals for a Welsh Assembly:
Mae'r Senedd wedi penderfynu ymgynghori pobl yng Nghymru ar gynigion y Llywodraeth ar gyfer Cynulliad i Gymru:

I agree there should be a Welsh Assembly
Yr wyf yn cytuno y dylid cael Cynulliad i Gymru

or

I do not agree there should be a Welsh Assembly
Nid wyf yn cytuno y dylid cael Cynulliad i Gymru

(To be marked by a single (X))

== Campaign ==
The official Yes campaign, Yes for Wales, was supported by Labour, the Liberal Democrats and Plaid Cymru, though they also ran their own individual campaigns. Labour anti-devolution MPs (including Llew Smith, among others) were subject to a tight parliamentary whip to ensure that the Labour Party was seen to be publicly behind the campaign. Yes for Wales placed a large emphasis on grassroots involvement in the campaign, with sectoral groups such as "Pensioners say Yes", and local branches throughout Wales.

Prominent campaigners for a Yes vote included Labour politicians Leighton Andrews, Ron Davies, Alun Michael, Rhodri Morgan, Andrew Davies, Peter Hain, Hywel Francis, Edwina Hart and Val Feld; Liberal Democrat politicians Michael German, Jenny Randerson, Kirsty Williams and Peter Black; Plaid Cymru politicians Dafydd Wigley, Cynog Dafis, Ieuan Wyn Jones and Leanne Wood; and academic Russell Deacon.

The official No campaign, Just Say NO, was chaired by Nick Bourne, then-Conservative "Chief Spokesman in Wales". The No campaign lacked the structure and finance of the Yes campaign, and suffered from the fact that the Conservatives' landslide defeat at the 1997 general election meant there were no Conservative MPs (and therefore no MPs supporting the No campaign) in Wales. Additionally, the No campaign in 1997 did not have the support of local authorities; the fact that the Conservatives had reduced layers of local government from two to one in 1994 meant that this was not an issue as it had been in 1979.

== Result ==
1997 Welsh devolution referendum
Choice	Votes	%
I agree that there should be a Welsh Assembly; Yr wyf yn cytuno y dylid cael Cynulliad i Gymru	559,419	50.30
I do not agree that there should be a Welsh Assembly; Nid wyf yn cytuno y dylid cael Cynulliad i Gymru	552,698	49.70
Total	1,112,117	100.00
Valid votes	1,112,117	99.64
Invalid/blank votes	3,999	0.36
Total votes	1,116,116	100.00
Registered voters/turnout	2,222,533	50.22

Note: In Wales under the Welsh Language Act 1993 the Welsh language has equal status with the English language.

National referendum results (excluding invalid votes)
Agree/Cytuno; 559,419 (50.3%)	Disagree/Anghytuno; 552,698 (49.7%)
▲50%

The overall result was declared in the Royal Welsh College of Music and Drama in Cardiff. The proceeding officer was Professor Eric Sunderland. The results of all 22 local authority areas were announced individually, and the result was close enough that everything in fact hung on the announcement from Carmarthenshire, which carried the Yes vote. The difference between the 'agree' and 'disagree' vote was 6,721.

=== Results by unitary authority ===
Council Area	Turnout	Votes		Proportion of votes	
Council Area	Turnout	Agree Cytuno	Disagree Anghytuno	Agree Cytuno	Disagree Anghytuno
Anglesey	56.9%	15,649	15,095	50.9%	49.1%
Blaenau Gwent	49.3%	15,237	11,928	56.1%	43.9%
Bridgend	50.6%	27,632	23,172	54.4%	45.6%
Caerphilly	49.3%	34,830	28,841	55.7%	44.3%
Cardiff	46.9%	47,527	59,589	44.4%	55.6%
Carmarthenshire	56.4%	49,115	26,119	65.5%	34.5%
Ceredigion	56.8%	18,304	12,614	59.2%	40.8%
Conwy	51.5%	18,369	26,521	40.9%	59.1%
Denbighshire	49.7%	14,271	20,732	40.5%	59.5%
Flintshire	41.0%	17,746	28,707	38.2%	61.8%
Gwynedd	59.8%	35,425	19,859	64.1%	35.9%
Merthyr Tydfil	49.5%	12,707	9,121	58.2%	41.8%
Monmouthshire	50.5%	10,592	22,403	32.1%	67.9%
Neath Port Talbot	51.9%	36,730	18,463	66.5%	33.5%
Newport	45.9%	16,172	27,017	37.5%	62.5%
Pembrokeshire	52.6%	19,979	26,712	42.8%	57.2%
Powys	56.2%	23,038	30,966	42.7%	57.3%
Rhondda Cynon Taff	49.9%	51,201	36,362	58.5%	41.5%
Swansea	47.1%	42,789	39,561	53.0%	47.0%
Torfaen	45.5%	15,756	15,854	49.8%	50.2%
Vale of Glamorgan	54.3%	17,776	30,613	35.5%	64.5%
Wrexham	42.4%	18,574	22,449	44.3%	55.7%

== See also ==
- Referendums in the United Kingdom
- Referendums (Scotland and Wales) Act 1997
- 1997 Scottish devolution referendum
- 2011 Welsh devolution referendum
- Yes for Wales
- Senedd
- Welsh devolution
