= Declaration of Perth =

The Declaration of Perth was a statement made by British Conservative Party leader Edward Heath on 18 May 1968, at the party conference in Perth, Scotland, which committed the party to supporting some form of Scottish devolution.

== Background ==
The Conservative Party in Scotland was traditionally a unionist party. In the late 1960s, support in Scotland for the pro-independence Scottish National Party was growing (seen spectacularly in Winnie Ewing's victory at the Hamilton by-election of 1967). In response the then Labour government set up the Kilbrandon Commission (1969–1973) to draw up its plans for devolution. Prior to Labour's initiative, at the Conservative Party Conference of 1968, held in Perth in Scotland, Edward Heath announced a party policy of support for devolution. Heath then formed a constitutional committee chaired by former Prime Minister Sir Alec Douglas-Home. In 1970, this committee produced "Scotland’s Government", a report that recommended the creation of a Scottish Assembly with 125 elected members and powers to initiate and discuss bills. However, the Bills were to require approval of the United Kingdom Parliament.

== Aftermath ==
The 1970 General Election was won by the Conservative Party, and Heath became prime minister. However, the electoral weakness of the Nationalists removed the political pressure for devolution, which caused it to slip from the agenda. The two general elections of 1974 saw the return of a minority Labour Government and advances by the Nationalists (they won 7 seats in the February election and 11 in the October election). Labour was thus dependent on Nationalist support in Parliament, and hence, despite some opposition from within its own party, passed the Scotland Act 1978. This act provided for devolution, subject to approval by a referendum which took place in 1979.

In 1975, Edward Heath was replaced as Conservative leader by Margaret Thatcher. Under her leadership, the Conservatives gradually returned to a policy of opposing Scottish devolution. However, former leader Alec Douglas-Home was still able to urge Scots to vote 'no' to Labour's proposal in 1979, with the promise that a Conservative government would offer a "better" bill.

When the referendum of 1979 failed to deliver the required mandate for devolution, the Nationalists withdrew their support for the Labour Government, resulting in a general election in 1979, which was won by the Conservatives. Despite being the only major party now opposing constitutional change and despite their reduced popularity and strength in Scotland, Conservative electoral victories in 1983, 1987 and 1992 ensured that no further legislative progress was made until the election of Labour under Tony Blair in 1997 led to a second devolution referendum.

Again the Conservatives opposed devolution in the 1997 debate (although Heath personally supported Labour's proposals), but this time their opposition was unsuccessful, and the Scottish Parliament was created by the Scotland Act 1998. Subsequent to its creation, the Conservative Party has indicated its acceptance of Scottish devolution as an irreversible political fact.
