= Referendums (Scotland and Wales) Act 1997 =

Act of the Parliament of the United Kingdom

Referendums (Scotland and Wales) Act 1997 (Note: Section 6.)
- Act of Parliament
- Parliament of the United Kingdom
- Long title: An Act to make provision for the holding of a referendum in Scotland on the establishment and tax-varying powers of a Scottish Parliament and a referendum in Wales on the establishment of a Welsh assembly; and for expenditure in preparation for a Scottish Parliament or a Welsh Assembly.
- Citation: 1997 c. 61
- Introduced by: Tony Blair, Prime Minister of the United Kingdom (Commons); John Sewel, Baron Sewel (Lords)
- Territorial extent: United Kingdom

Dates
- Royal assent: 31 July 1997
- Commencement: 31 July 1997 (Note: Section 4(b) of the Interpretation Act 1978.)
Other legislation
Relates to	Scotland Act 1998; Government of Wales Act 1998

Status: Current legislation

Text of statute as originally enacted

Revised text of statute as amended

The Referendums (Scotland and Wales) Act 1997 (c. 61) is an act of the Parliament of the United Kingdom, which made legal provision for the holding of two non-binding referendums in both Scotland on the establishment of a democratically elected Scottish Parliament with tax-varying powers and in Wales on the establishment of a democratically elected Welsh Assembly. In an unusual move the referendums bill was introduced to the House of Commons by the then Prime Minister Tony Blair himself on 15 May 1997 just two weeks after the landslide Labour victory in the 1997 General Election and was the very first Government sponsored bill to finish scrutiny in the Commons under the first Blair ministry. The act received royal assent on 31 July 1997 and became Spent upon the conclusion of both referendums.

== Background ==
On 1 March 1979, voters in both Scotland and Wales voted in referendums on proposed Assemblies under the provisions of the Scotland Act 1978 and the Wales Act 1978. The result in Scotland was a narrow "yes" by 51% of voters but failed to achieve an overall minimum 40% "yes" vote of the registered electorate and the motion failed to pass and in Wales the proposal was rejected outright by 79% of voters and political fallout from the results led to the fall of the Labour government, 1974–1979 which then led to Margaret Thatcher's victory in the 1979 UK General Election and the beginning of eighteen years of Conservative government.

== Provisions ==
The act legislated for the holding of non-binding referendums to be held on 11 September 1997 in Scotland on whether there should be a democratically elected Scottish Parliament with tax varying powers and on 18 September 1997 in Wales on whether there should be a democratically elected Welsh Assembly and gave powers to both the Secretary of State for Scotland and the Secretary of State for Wales to enable the referendums to take place and gave them both the power to appoint Chief Counting Officers to oversee the referendums. The legislation limits the ability of courts to question the results announced by counting officers.

Section 3 of the act gave effect to schedule 3, which made provision for the conduct of the referendums. Section 4 provided that no court was to entertain proceedings questioning the number of ballot papers counted or votes cast as certified by a Chief Counting Officer or counting officer. Section 5 charged expenditure under the schedule on the Consolidated Fund, and provided for the expenditure of a Minister of the Crown in connection with the referendums, or in preparation for a Scottish Parliament or a Welsh Assembly, to be paid out of money provided by Parliament. Section 6 provided the short title.

== Franchise ==
The right to vote in the referendums in both Scotland and Wales applied to residents who were British, Irish and Commonwealth citizens as well as those who were entitled to vote in all local government elections including all resident EU citizens. Members of the House of Lords from both Scotland and Wales were also able to vote in the referendums. The minimum age for voters in both referendums was 18 years with polling stations open from 07:00 to 22:00 BST. In total almost 6.2 million people would be eligible to vote across Scotland and Wales combined in the referendums.

== Referendum in Scotland ==
The act legislated for a referendum to be held across Scotland on 11 September 1997 on the establishment of a Scottish Parliament with tax varying powers. The Secretary of State for Scotland under the act would appoint a Chief Counting Officer to oversee the referendum and also appoint local counting officers in each of the local government areas. Just under four million people were eligible to vote including EU nationals residing in Scotland.

=== Referendum questions ===
Under the Act the electorate was asked to vote on two sets of statements which corresponded to both proposals on different coloured ballot papers.

==== Question 1 ====
On the first ballot paper the following appeared:

Parliament has decided to consult people in Scotland on the Government's proposals for a Scottish Parliament:

I agree there should be a Scottish Parliament

or

I do not agree there should be a Scottish Parliament

(To be marked by a single (X))

==== Question 2 ====
On the second ballot paper the following appeared:

Parliament has decided to consult people in Scotland on the Government's proposals for a Scottish Parliament to have tax-varying powers:

I agree that a Scottish Parliament should have tax-varying powers

or

I do not agree that a Scottish Parliament should have tax-varying powers

(To be marked by a single (X))

=== Counting areas ===
The 32 Scottish council areas were used as the counting areas for the referendum under the provisions of the Act.

=== Question 1 result ===
Map showing results by council. 80–90% Yes 70–80% Yes 60–70% Yes

Scottish devolution referendum, 1997 (Question 1)
Choice	Votes	%
I agree there should be a Scottish Parliament	1,775,045	74.29
I do not agree that there should be a Scottish Parliament	614,400	25.71
Total	2,389,445	100.00
Valid votes	2,389,445	99.50
Invalid/blank votes	11,986	0.50
Total votes	2,401,431	100.00
Registered voters/turnout	3,973,673	60.43

Question 1 referendum results (without spoiled ballots):
Agree: 1,775,045 (74.3%)	Disagree: 614,400 (25.7%)
▲

Every council area voted "I agree" to the proposed Scottish Parliament.

=== Question 2 result ===
Map showing results by council. 70–80% Yes 60–70% Yes 50–60% Yes <50% Yes

Scottish devolution referendum, 1997 (Question 2)
Choice	Votes	%
I agree that a Scottish Parliament should have tax-varying powers	1,512,889	63.48
I do not agree that a Scottish Parliament should have tax-varying powers	870,263	36.52
Total	2,383,152	100.00
Valid votes	2,383,152	99.21
Invalid/blank votes	19,013	0.79
Total votes	2,402,165	100.00
Registered voters/turnout	3,973,673	60.45

Question 2 referendum results (without spoiled ballots):
Agree: 1,512,889 (63.5%)	Disagree: 870,263 (36.5%)
▲

Votes in favour of tax-varying powers still commanded significant majority, when compared to establishing the Parliament per se. A majority voted 'I agree' in every local council, apart from in Dumfries & Galloway and Orkney.

== Referendum in Wales ==
The act legislated for a referendum to be held in Wales on 18 September 1997 on the establishment of a Welsh Assembly. The Secretary of State for Wales under the act would appoint a Chief Counting Officer to oversee the referendum and also appoint local counting officers. Almost two and a quarter million people were eligible to vote including EU nationals residing in Wales.

=== Referendum question ===
On the ballot paper the following appeared in both English and Welsh:

Parliament has decided to consult people in Wales on the Government's proposals for a Welsh Assembly:
Mae'r Senedd wedi penderfynu ymgynghori pobl yng Nghymru ar gynigion y Llywodraeth ar gyfer Cynulliad i Gymru:

I agree there should be a Welsh Assembly
Yr wyf yn cytuno dylid cael Cynulliad i Gymru

or

I do not agree there should be a Welsh Assembly
Nid wyf yn cytuno dylid cael Cynulliad i Gymru

(To be marked by a single (X))

=== Counting areas ===
The 22 Welsh council areas were used as the counting areas for the referendum under the provisions of the Act.

=== Result ===
Map showing results by council.

Welsh devolution referendum, 1997
Choice	Votes	%
I agree that there should be a Welsh Assembly; Yr wyf yn cytuno y dylid cael Cynulliad i Gymru	559,419	50.30
I do not agree that there should be a Welsh Assembly; Nid wyf yn cytuno y dylid cael Cynulliad i Gymru	552,698	49.70
Total	1,112,117	100.00
Valid votes	1,112,117	99.64
Invalid/blank votes	3,999	0.36
Total votes	1,116,116	100.00
Registered voters/turnout	2,222,533	50.22

Note: In Wales under the Welsh Language Act 1993 the Welsh language has equal status with the English language.

National referendum results (without spoiled ballots):
Agree/Cytuno: 559,419 (50.3%)	Disagree/Anghytuno: 552,698 (49.7%)
▲

== Outcome ==
Following the results of both referendums the Scotland Act 1998 and the Government of Wales Act 1998 were both passed by the UK Parliament which established both the Scottish Parliament and the Welsh Assembly and came into being following elections in both Scotland and in Wales in 1999.

== Subsequent developments ==
The Law Commission and the Scottish Law Commission have suggested the act should be repealed due to being spent and therefore obsolete.

== See also ==
- Referendums in the United Kingdom
- 1999 Scottish Parliament election
- 1999 National Assembly for Wales election
