= Scottish devolution referendum =

Scottish devolution referendum may refer to:

- 1979 Scottish devolution referendum
- 1997 Scottish devolution referendum
