= Welsh devolution =

Transfer of powers to Wales

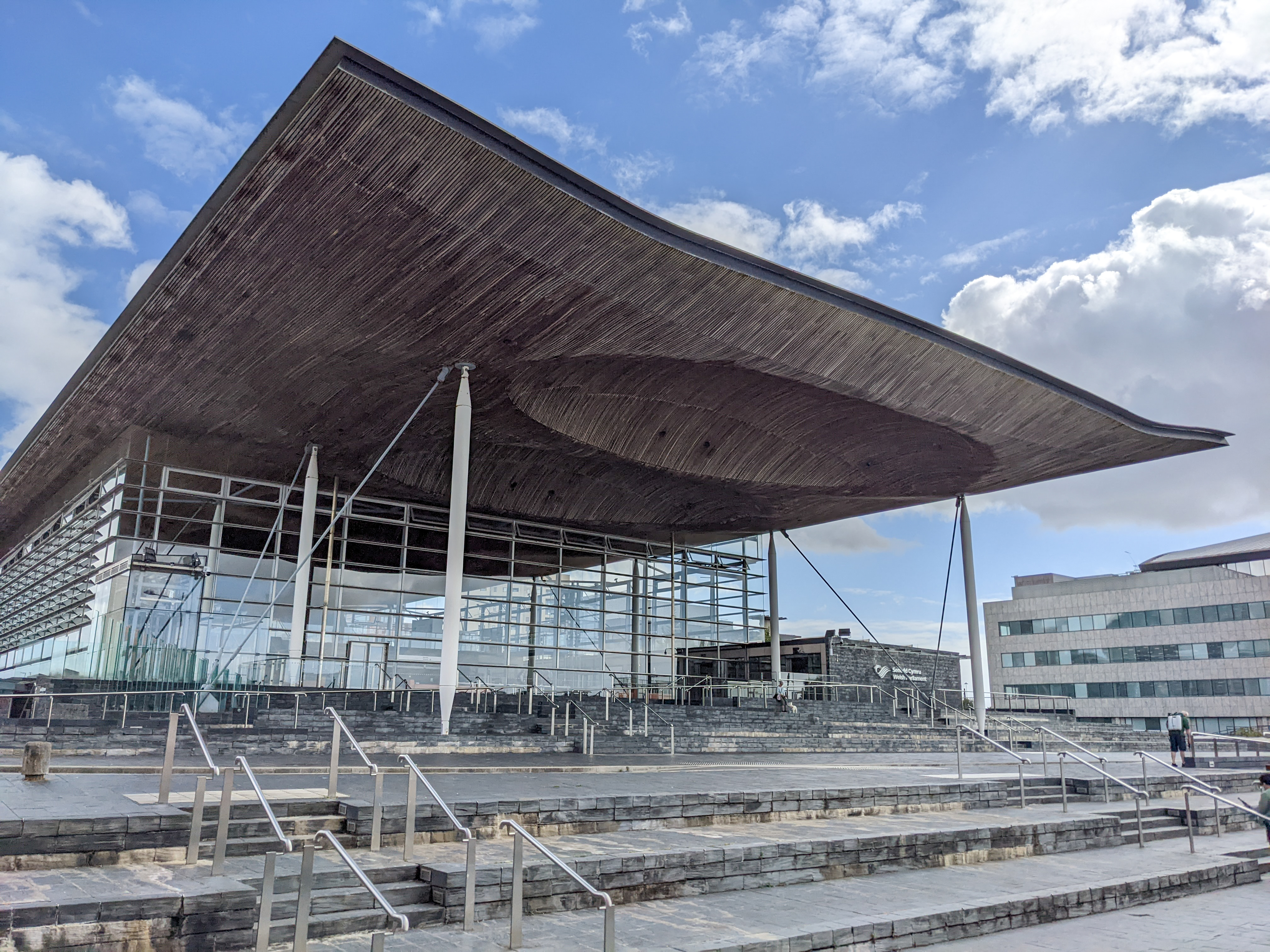
Senedd building

Welsh devolution is the transfer of legislative powers for self-governance to Wales by the Parliament of the United Kingdom. The current system of devolution began following the enactment of the Government of Wales Act 1998, with the responsibility of various devolved powers granted to the Welsh Government rather than being the responsibility of the Government of the United Kingdom.

Wales was conquered by England during the 13th century, with the Laws in Wales Acts 1535 and 1542 applying English law to Wales and incorporating it into England (survives as the England and Wales legal jurisdiction), and later into Great Britain and the United Kingdom. A rise in Welsh nationalism and political movements advocating for Welsh autonomy became more prominent in the late nineteenth century. The devolution of some administrative responsibilities began in the early twentieth century, as well as the passing of laws specific to Wales. Since World War II, various movements and proposals have advocated different models of Welsh devolution.

A 1979 referendum on devolution failed by 79%, while a 1997 referendum narrowly won. Laws were subsequently passed to establish the National Assembly for Wales and grant it secondary legislative powers over areas such as agriculture, education and housing. The third referendum, in 2011, saw voters support full primary law-making powers for the national assembly over specified areas of governance. In 2020, the assembly was renamed to the Welsh Parliament, or Senedd Cymru (commonly known as the Senedd), to better reflect its expanded legislative powers.

The Welsh Labour Party advocates for further devolution and sometimes federalism, whilst the Welsh nationalist party, Plaid Cymru, has described devolution as a stepping stone towards full Welsh independence.

== Incorporation of Wales into England ==
Wales was conquered by England during the 13th century and the last native prince of Wales, Llywelyn ap Gruffudd, was killed in an ambush by an English soldier in 1282. The 1284 Statute of Rhuddlan caused Wales to lose its de facto independence and formed the constitutional basis for it as a principality in the Realm of England.

Owain Glyndŵr briefly restored Welsh independence in a national uprising that began in 1400. He convened Wales's first Senedd in Machynlleth in 1404, but the Welsh were defeated by the English by 1412. The penal laws against the Welsh of 1401-02 passed by the English parliament made the Welsh second-class citizens. With hopes of independence ended, there were no further wars or rebellions against English rule and the laws remained on the statute books until 1624.

The English parliament's Laws in Wales Acts 1535 and 1542 applied English law to Wales and united the Principality and the Marches of Wales, effectively abolishing both regions and incorporating Wales into England. The Wales and Berwick Act 1746 defined "England" to include Wales.

== History ==
=== Home rule movement ===
==== Disestablishment of the Anglican church ====
The Sunday Closing (Wales) Act 1881 was the first legislation to acknowledge that Wales had a separate politico-legal character from the rest of the English state. At the time, a majority of people in Wales belonged to noncomformists chapels despite members of the Church of England having legal and social privileges. The Sunday Closing Act was therefore celebrated in Wales as a significant step towards establishing equal status for the noncomformist chapels and disestablishing the Anglican church in Wales. Historian and former BBC Wales producer John Trefor suggests that the act "was a victory, not only for the chapels and the temperance leagues, but for Welsh identity. He goes on to say, "There was a sense that things could be done differently here. Wales-only Education and cemetery acts came soon after, and in many respects it established the principle on which devolution and the National Assembly are based."

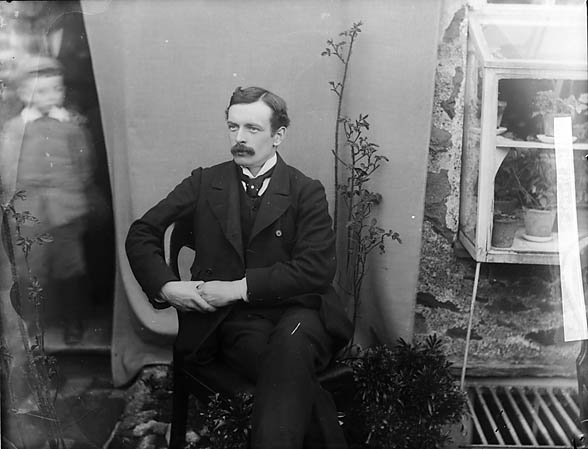
David Lloyd George

David Lloyd George, MP for Caernarfon at the time, was devoted to Welsh devolution early in his career, starting with the Church in Wales. He said in 1890; "I am deeply impressed with the fact that Wales has wants and inspirations of her own which have too long been ignored, but which must no longer be neglected. First and foremost amongst these stands the cause of religious liberty and equality in Wales. If returned to Parliament by you, it shall be my earnest endeavour to labour for the triumph of this great cause. I believe in a liberal extension of the principle of decentralisation." In 1895, in a Church in Wales Bill which was ultimately unsuccessful, Lloyd George added an amendment in a discreet attempt at forming a sort of Welsh home rule, a national council for appointment of the Welsh Church commissioners. The Welsh Church Act 1914 was passed giving the Church in Wales the freedom to govern its own affairs. After being suspended for the duration of the First World War, the Act came into effect from 1920.

==== Home rule ====
In response to the Irish demand for "home rule", Liberal prime minister of the UK, William Gladstone proposed two bills on home rule for Ireland in 1886 and 1893, which both failed. Although the idea of "home rule all round" had been around since the 1830s the idea became more popular in 1910 during the constitutional conference and on the brink of an Irish war during 1913–14.

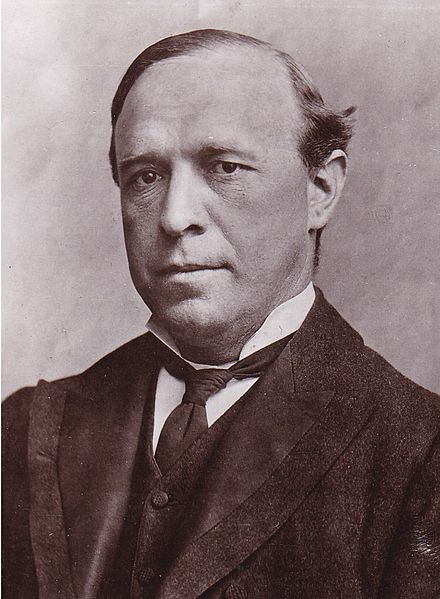
Llywelyn Williams set up the first Cymru Fydd branch on Welsh soil in Barry in 1891.

Political movements supporting Welsh self-rule began in the late nineteenth century alongside a rise in Welsh nationalism. In the same year as the first bill for Ireland was proposed, the Cymru Fydd (Wales To Be/Wales Will Be) movement was founded to further the home rule cause for Wales. Lloyd George was one of the main leaders of Cymru Fydd which was an organisation created with the aim of establishing a Welsh Government and a "stronger Welsh identity". As such Lloyd George was seen as a radical figure in British politics and was associated with the reawakening of Welsh nationalism and identity. Historian Emyr Price has referred to him as "the first architect of Welsh devolution and its most famous advocate’" as well as "the pioneering advocate of a powerful parliament for the Welsh people". The first Cymru Fydd societies were set up in Liverpool and London in 1887 and in the winter of 1886–7, the North and South Wales liberal federations were founded. Lloyd George was also particularly active in attempting to set up a separate Welsh National Party which was based on Charles Stewart Parnell's Irish Parliamentary Party and also worked to unite the North and South Wales Liberal Federations with Cymru Fydd to form a Welsh National Liberal Federation. The Cymru Fydd movement collapsed in 1896 amid personal rivalries and rifts between Liberal representatives such as David Alfred Thomas. In 1898 however, David Lloyd George managed to form the Welsh National Liberal Council, a loose umbrella organisation covering the two federations.

Support for home rule for Wales and Scotland amongst most political parties was strongest in 1918 following the independence of other European countries after the First World War, and the Easter Rising in Ireland, wrote Dr Davies. Although Cymru Fydd had collapsed, home rule was still on the agenda, with liberal Joseph Chamberlain proposing "Home Rule All Round" for all nations of the United Kingdom, in part to meet Irish demands but maintain the superiority of the imperial parliament of Westminster. This idea which eventually fell out of favour after "southern Ireland" left the UK and became a dominion in 1921 and the Irish free state was established in 1922. Home rule all round became official labour party policy, by the 1920s, but the Liberals lost interest because if a Welsh Parliament was formed they would not control it.

==== Welsh institutions form ====
The late 19th century saw the formation of a number of national institutions; a national and annual cultural event, the National Eisteddfod of Wales in 1861, the Football Association of Wales in 1876, the Welsh Rugby Union in 1881 and the University of Wales in 1893.

In 1896, Education in Wales began to become distinct with the formation of the Central Welsh Board which inspected grammar schools in Wales and The Welsh Intermediate Education Act 1889 was brought about to "make further provision for the intermediate and technical education of the inhabitants of Wales and the county of Monmouth.", making the board responsible for inspection of secondary schools. In 1907, the Welsh department of the Board of Education was formed and in the same year, a Welsh Inspectorate was established for inspection of primary and secondary schools in Wales.

The early 20th century also saw the continued formation of a number of Welsh national institutions; the National Library of Wales in 1911, the Welsh Guards in 1915 and the Welsh Board of Health in 1919. The Church in Wales came into existence in 1920 following the disestablishment of the Church of England via the Welsh Church Act 1914.

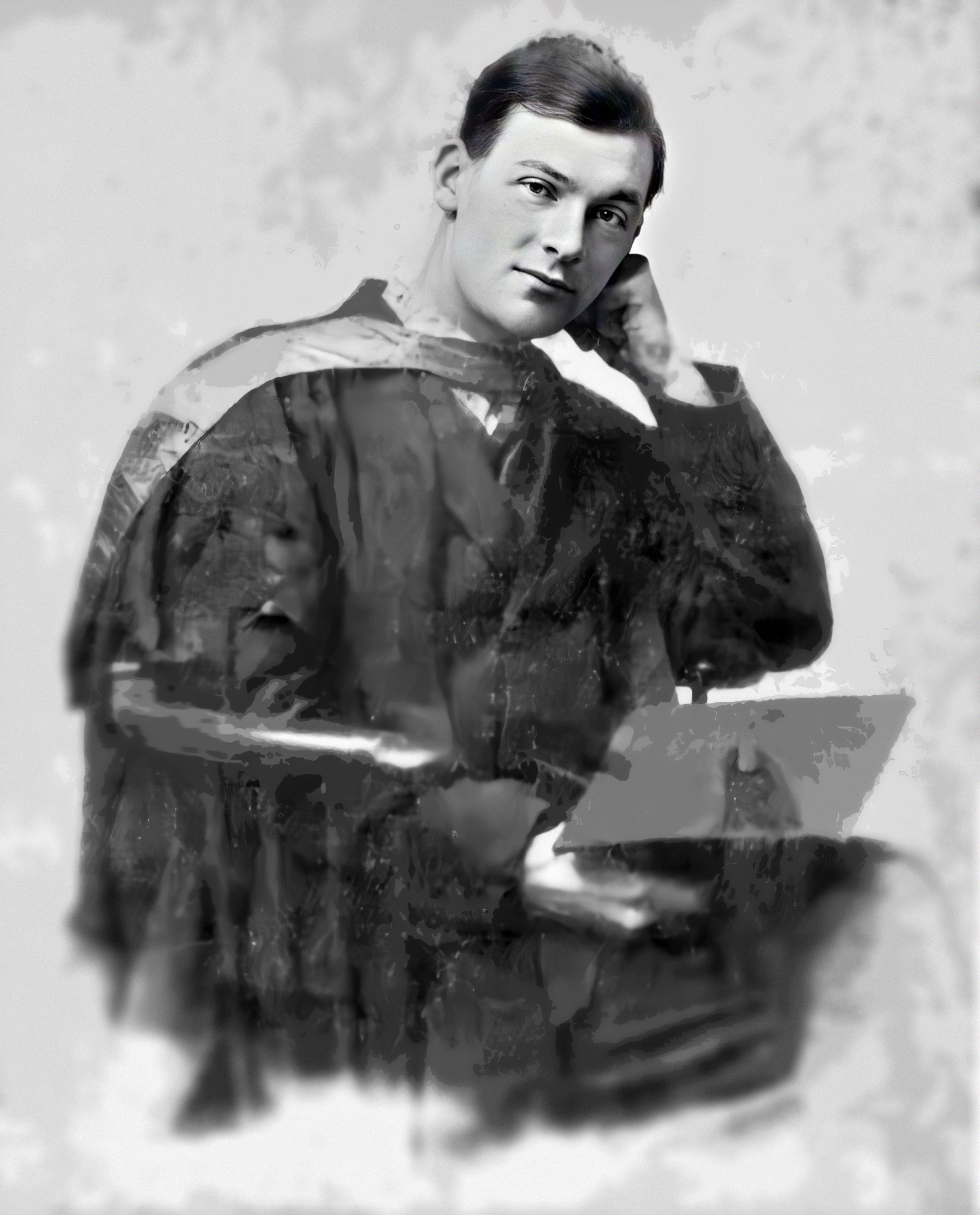
Lewis Valentine, first president of Plaid Cymru.

There had been discussions about the need for a "Welsh party" since the 19th century. With the generation or so before 1922 there "had been a marked growth in the constitutional recognition of the Welsh nation", wrote historian Dr John Davies. By 1924 there were people in Wales "eager to make their nationality the focus of Welsh politics". In 1925 Plaid Genedlaethol Cymru ("the National Party of Wales") was founded; it was renamed Plaid Cymru – The Party of Wales in 1945. The party's principles defined in 1970 were (1) self government for Wales, (2) to safeguard the culture, traditions, language and economic position of Wales and (3) to secure membership for a self-governing Welsh state in the United Nations.

Early members of the Independent Labour Party attempted to establish a South Wales Federation towards the end of the 19th century but the South Wales Regional Council of Labour was not established until 1937. The UK Labour government elected in 1945 was strongly centrist, but in the same year, there were 15 UK Government departments established in Wales. By 1947, a unified Welsh Regional Council of Labour became responsible for all Wales. In 1959 the Labour council title was changed from "Welsh Regional council" to "Welsh council", and the Labour body was renamed Labour Party Wales in 1975.

==== Council for Wales and Monmouthshire ====
Welsh Labour backbenchers such as D. R. Grenfell, W. H. Mainwaring and James Griffiths supported the establishment of a Secretary of State post whereas Aneurin Bevan thought devolution would distract from "British mainstream politics". The UK Government compromised and agreed to the establishment of a Council for Wales and Monmouthshire. However, it was given no more than a responsibility to advise the UK government on matters of Welsh interest.

The proposal to set up a Council for Wales and Monmouthshire was announced in the House of Commons on 24 November 1948. Its inaugural meeting was in May 1949, and its first business meeting the following month. Its terms of reference were:

- to meet from time to time and at least quarterly for the interchange of views and information on development and trends in the economic and cultural fields in Wales and Monmouthshire; and
- to ensure the government is adequately informed of the impact of government activities on the general life of the people of Wales and Monmouthshire.

The Council for Wales and Monmouthshire had 27 appointed members. Of these, 12 were nominated by Welsh local authorities; there were also nominees from the Joint Education Committee, the University of Wales, the National Eisteddfod Council, the Welsh Tourist and Holidays Board, and from both management and union sides of Welsh industry and agriculture. The chairman was Huw T. Edwards, a trade union leader. The Council met in private, a further source of controversy. It set up various panels and committees to investigate issues affecting Wales, including a Welsh Language Panel to study and report upon the present situation of the language; a Government Administration Panel; an Industrial Panel; a Rural Development Panel; a Transport Panel; and a Tourist Industry Panel.

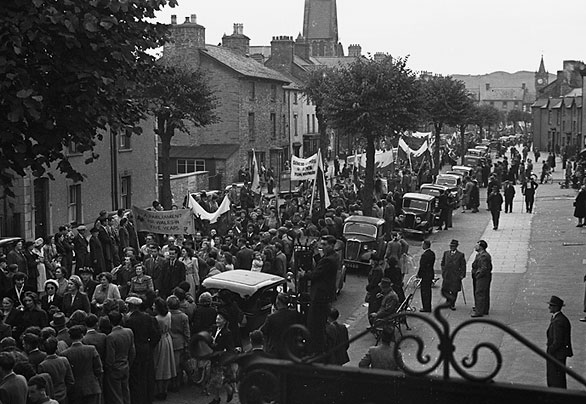
A Plaid Cymru rally in Machynlleth in 1949 where the "Parliament for Wales in 5 years" campaign was started

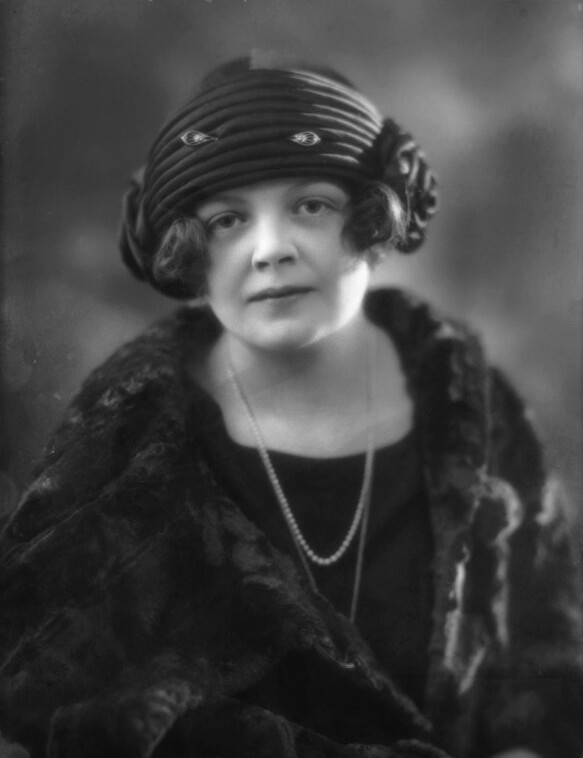
Megan Lloyd George, leader of the Parliament for Wales campaign 1950–1956.

==== Parliament for Wales campaign ====
In the 1950s, the deterioration of the British Empire removed a sense of Britishness and there was a realisation that Wales was not as prosperous as south-east England and smaller European countries. Successive Conservative Party victories in Westminster led to suggestions that only through self-government could Wales achieve a government reflecting the votes of a Welsh electorate. The Tryweryn flooding was opposed by 125 local authorities and 27 of 36 Welsh MPs voted against the second reading of the bill with none voting for it. At the time, Wales had no Welsh office (introduced in 1964) or any devolution. John Davies adds that the representatives of Wales were powerless under the political structure of the time, a core message of Plaid Cymru. The Epynt clearance in 1940 has also been described as a "significant - but often overlooked - chapter in the history of Wales".

Those in favour of a Welsh parliament paraded in Machynlleth (the place of Owain Glyndŵr's last Senedd) on 1 October 1949. Speakers and entertainment were also at the event. From 1950 to 1956, Parliament for Wales campaign brought devolution back onto the political agenda. A cross-party campaign was led by Lady Megan Lloyd George, daughter of former prime minister and campaigner for Welsh devolution, David Lloyd George, who had died in 1945. The Campaign for a Welsh parliament (Ymgyrch Senedd i Gymru) was formally launched on 1 July 1950, at a rally in Llandrindod. This event lead to the creation of a petition of 240,652 names calling for the establishment of a Welsh parliament, which was presented to the House of Commons by Megan Lloyd George in 1956. This was rejected by the UK government. Petitions were also presented to the House of Commons for a Secretary of State for Wales which were also rejected.

==== Government of Wales Bill ====
In 1955, S. O. Davies introduced the first Government of Wales Bill in Westminster, but it did not pass.

==== Welsh Office & Secretary of State for Wales ====
In the first half of the 20th century, a number of politicians had supported the creation of the post of Secretary of State for Wales as a step towards home rule for Wales. A post of Minister of Welsh Affairs was created in 1951 under the home secretary and was promoted to Minister of State level in 1954. In 1964, the UK Labour government formed a new office of the Secretary of State for Wales and in 1965 the Welsh Office was created which was run by the Secretary of State for Wales and which was responsible for implementing UK government policies in Wales. In 1999 the Welsh Office made way for the National Assembly for Wales and staff from the Welsh office moved into the National Assembly.

==== Official flag and capital city ====
The first official flag of Wales was created in 1953 for the coronation of Queen Elizabeth II. This "augmented" flag including the Royal badge of Wales was criticised in 1958 by "Gorsedd y Beirdd", a national Welsh group comprising Welsh literary figures and Welsh people of note. In 1959, likely in response to criticism, the Welsh flag was changed to a red Welsh dragon on a green and white background that remains the current flag of Wales today.

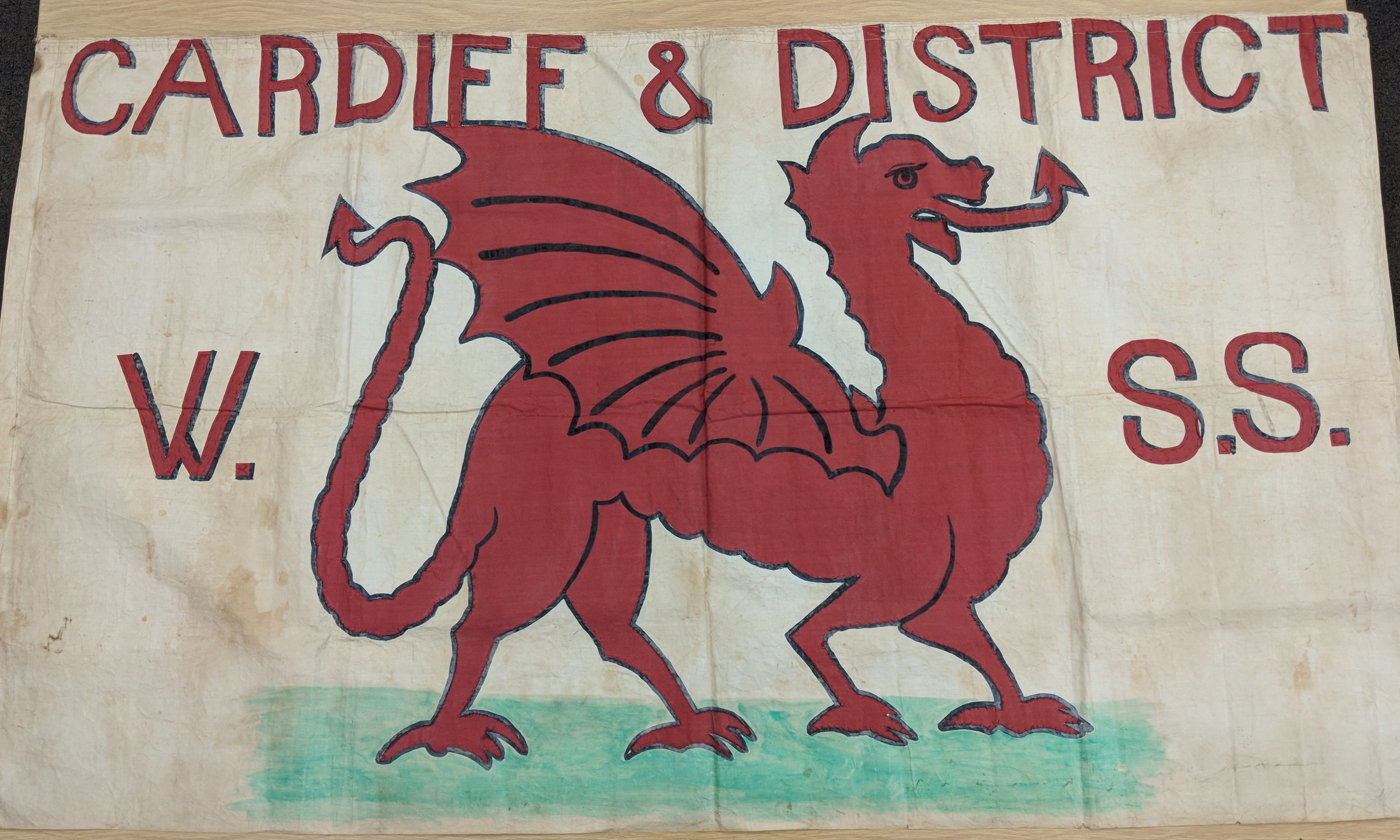
1908 banner used by Cardiff & District Women's Suffrage Society

Flag of Wales today featuring the Welsh Dragon

On 21 December 1955, the Lord Mayor of Cardiff announced to a crowd that Cardiff was now the official capital of Wales following a vote the previous day by Welsh local authority members. Cardiff won the vote with 136 votes and Caernarfon came in second place with 11 votes. A campaign for Cardiff to become the capital city had been ongoing for 30 years prior to the vote. Historian James Cowan outlined some reasons why Cardiff was chosen which included; being the largest city in Wales with a population of 243,632, buildings in Cathays park such as City Hall and the National Museum of Wales among other reasons. Dr Martin Johnes, lecturer at Swansea University suggested that following the formation of the National Assembly for Wales in 1999, Cardiff became "a capital in a meaningful way, as the home of the Welsh government, whereas before, its capital status was irrelevant, it was just symbolic".

==== First Plaid Cymru MP ====
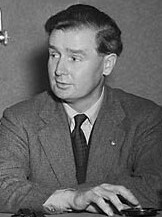
Gwynfor Evans in 1951.

The leader of Plaid Cymru, Gwynfor Evans won the party's first-ever seat in Westminster in Carmarthen in 1966, which "helped change the course of a nation" according to Dr Martin Johnes of Swansea University. This, paired with the SNP's Winnie Ewing's winning a seat in Hamilton, Scotland in 1967 may have contributed to pressure on Labour prime minister Harold Wilson to form the Kilbrandon Commission. This event may have also contributed to the passing of the Welsh Language Act 1967. This act repealed a provision in the Wales and Berwick Act 1746 that the term "England" should include Wales, thus defining Wales to be a separate entity from England within the UK. The legislation permitted the use of Welsh including in courts of law. The act was in part based upon the Hughes Parry Report from 1965. While the Welsh Courts Act in 1942 had previously allowed limited use of Welsh if defendants or plaintiffs had limited knowledge of English, the 1967 act was far more robust. While the act itself was quite limited, it had large symbolic importance. In 1966, Emlyn Hooson convinced a majority of delegates to merge both the Welsh liberal federations into a single entity, forming the Welsh Liberal Party. The new party had far more authority, and gradually centralised the finances and policy of the party in Wales.

==== National Assembly referendums ====
The UK Labour government introduced separate devolution bills for Wales, Scotland and Northern Ireland in 1977 following the support for a Scottish parliament by the Kilbrandon Commission. On St David's Day (March 1), 1979 Welsh devolution referendum was held on a Welsh Assembly but came at the end of the Winter of Discontent in addition to "tribalism" divisions within Wales. According to John Morris, people in southern Wales were persuaded that the Assembly would be dominated by "bigoted Welsh-speakers from the north and the west" whilst in the northern Wales, people were persuaded that the Assembly would be dominated by Glamorgan County Council “Taffia”. Richard Wyn Jones also suggests that suspicions of a secret elite of a "Taffia" or "crachach" may have affected the referendum results,“There was a perception amongst anti-devolutionists that devolution was some sort of plot by the establishment, by the crachach. Their [the anti-devolutionists’] idea that they were standing up for ‘the people’ was reinforced by 1979.” Welsh voters voted against forming an Assembly, with 79.7% voting against and 20.3% who voting Yes. Meanwhile, Scotland had narrowly voted in favour of a Scottish parliament with 51.6% in favour.

The Welsh Language Act 1993 provided a new law for public organisations in Wales to have bilingual schemes, which would be supervised by the Welsh Language Board. Some private sector companies including British Telecoms (BT) and British Gas had already included Welsh language schemes in company policies before this Act.

In the 1980s, economic restructuring and market reforms by Margaret Thatcher are described as having brought social dislocation to parts of Wales, which was formerly described as having "the largest public sector west of the Iron Curtain". A succession of non-Welsh Conservative Secretaries of State after 1987 was portrayed by opponents as 'colonial' and indicative of a 'democratic deficit'.

In the early 1990s, Labour became committed to devolution to both Scotland and Wales, and in 1997 it was elected with a mandate to hold referendums on a Scottish Parliament and a Welsh Assembly. The political climate was very different from that of 1979 Welsh devolution referendum which resulted in a no vote, with a new generation of Welsh MPs in Westminster and a broad consensus on the previously divisive issue of the Welsh language. In the 1997 Welsh devolution referendum, a majority of the Welsh electorate vote in favour of establishing a National Assembly for Wales by 50.3 per cent, on a 50.2 per cent turnout.

=== Devolved legislature (1998–present) ===
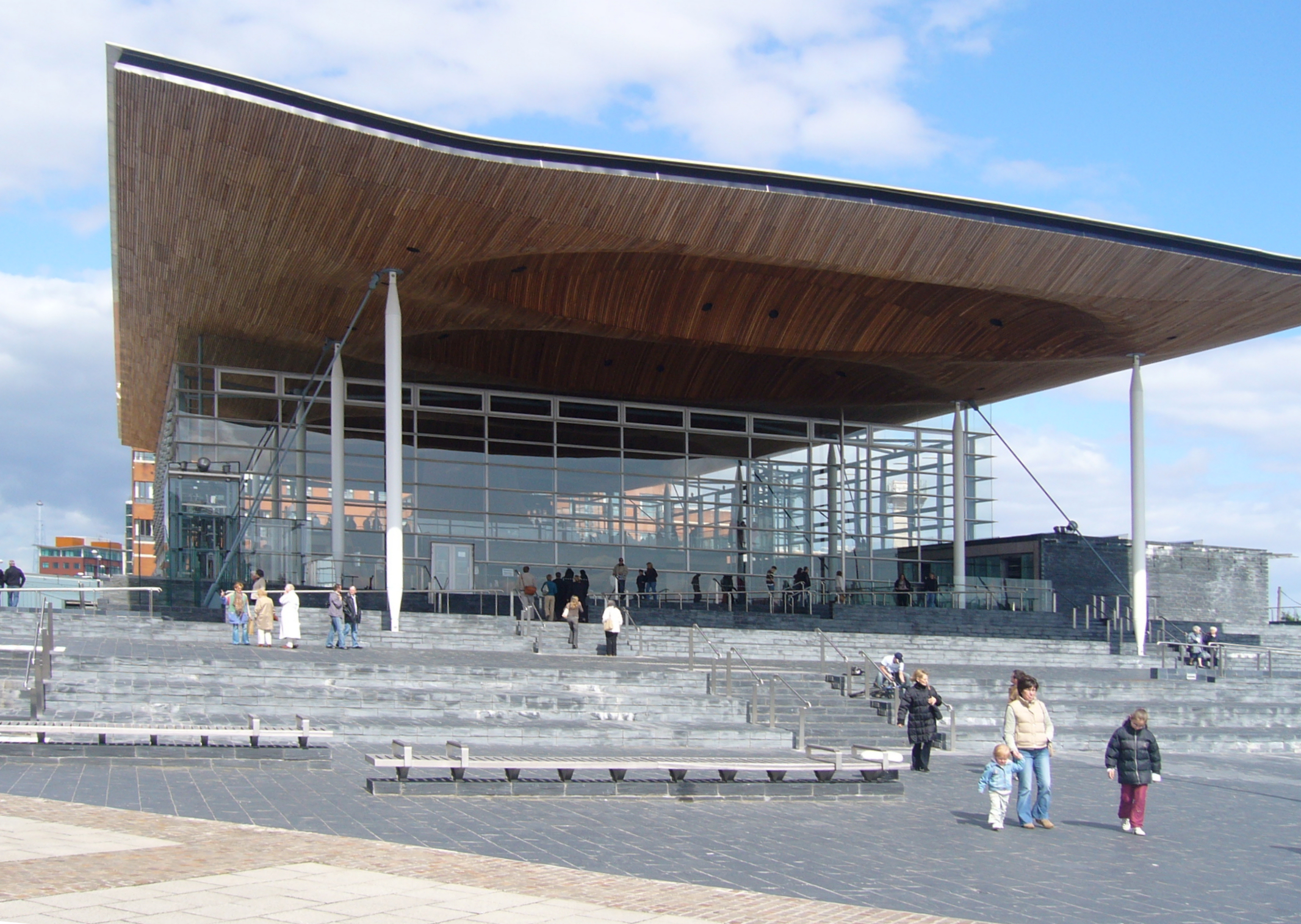
Senedd building, Cardiff Bay (formerly National Assembly for Wales).

The Government of Wales Act 1998 granted the formation of the National Assembly and granted it a significant number of new powers which included most of the powers previously held by the Secretary of State for Wales and at least 20 national institutions including the Education and Learning Wales, Environment Agency Wales and the Welsh Language Board. The National Assembly for Wales was formed in 1999 and the UK Parliament reserved the right to set limits on its powers.

==== Law making ====
The Commission on the Powers and Electoral Arrangements of the National Assembly for Wales (the Richard Commission) was formed in 2002. This commission made a series of recommendations in 2004. These included an increased number of members, legally separating executive and legislative acts and the devolution of primary law-making powers. A large majority of these findings were used by the UK government to introduce the Government of Wales Act 2006, describing the powers and responsibilities of the devolved authorities for legislating, decision-making and policy-making. In March 2011, a referendum was held on whether full primary law-making powers should be given to the National Assembly in the twenty subject areas where it held jurisdiction. The referendum concluded with 63.5% of voters supporting the transfer of full primary law-making powers to the Assembly.

==== Official country and language status ====
In 2011, the International Standards Organisation officially changed the status of Wales to country after the term "principality" was used in error. This came about following lobbying from Plaid Cymru AM (Assembly Member) Leanne Wood. Legally Wales had ceased to be a principality since the period that the Statue of Rhuddlan was implemented from 1284 to 1542. The governments of the United Kingdom and of Wales almost invariably define Wales as a country. VisitWales.com states that "Wales is not a Principality. Although we are joined with England by land, and we are part of Great Britain, Wales is a country in its own right."

The Welsh Language (Wales) Measure 2011 modernised the 1993 Welsh Language Act and gave Welsh an official status in Wales for the first time, a major landmark for the language. Welsh is the only official de jure language of any country in the UK. The Measure was also responsible for creating the post of Welsh Language Commissioner, replacing the Welsh Language Board. Following the referendum in 2011, the Official Languages Act became the first Welsh law to be created in 600 years, according to the First Minister at the time, Carwyn Jones. This law was passed by Welsh AMs (assembly members) only and made Welsh an official language of the National Assembly.

==== Further powers ====
The UK Government also formed the Commission on Devolution in Wales (the Silk Commission). The commission published part 1 of its report in 2012, recommending new financial powers for Wales including borrowing and taxation, which came into force in the Wales Act 2014. The Tax Collection and Management (Wales) Act 2016 was passed by the National Assembly to facilitate the financial powers of the Wales Act 2014. The Land Transaction Tax (replacing Stamp Duty) and the Landfill Disposal Tax were the very first two devolved taxes. In 2019, over £2 billion of income tax was devolved to the Senedd.

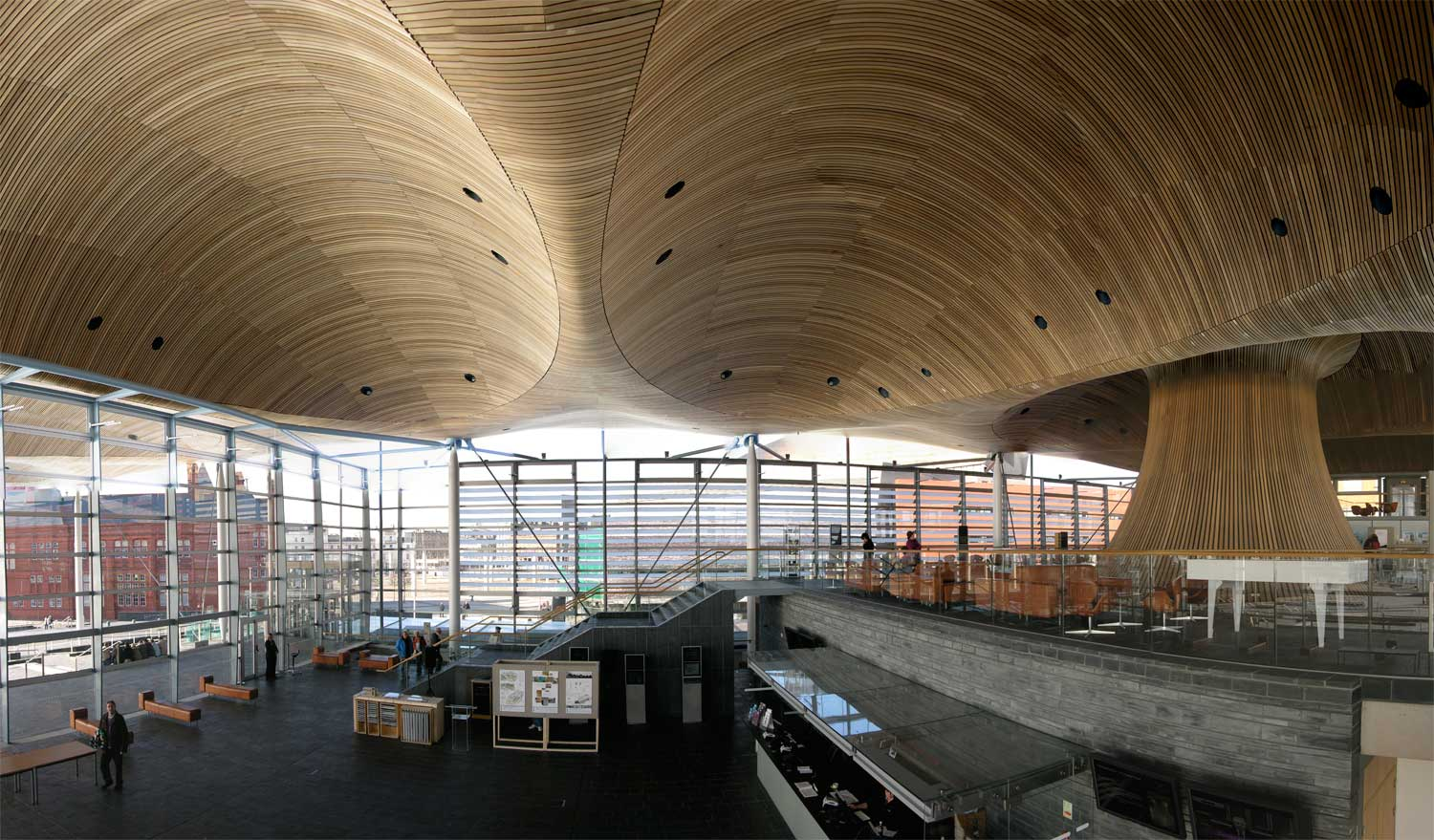
Hall and oriel of the Senedd building.

The Wales Act 2017 defined the National Assembly and devolved institutions to be a permanent component of the UK constitution, and any abolition of such institutions would require a referendum. The act also changed the model of operation of the devolved institutions from a "conferred powers model" to a "reserved powers model". This allowed the Assembly to legislate on any matter that is not expressly reserved from its competence. The Assembly was also given the power to decide its own name and voting system of members. In May 2020, the Senedd and Elections (Wales) Act 2020, the National Assembly for Wales was renamed "Senedd Cymru" or "the Welsh Parliament", commonly known as the "Senedd" in both English and Welsh, to reflect increased legislative powers. The Act for the first time in Wales allowed 16 and 17-year-olds the right to vote, beginning with the 2021 Senedd election.

Plaid Cymru proposed two bills to the UK parliament in the 2021–22 parliamentary session which ultimately did not gain royal assent. A Crown Estate (Devolution to Wales) Bill - A bill to devolve the Crown Estate's management and assets in Wales to the Welsh Government was sponsored by Liz Saville Roberts. Shared Prosperity Fund (Wales) Bill - A bill which would require the Secretary of State to report to Parliament on the merits of devolving management and administration of the money allocated to Wales via the Shared Prosperity Fund to the Welsh Government, was sponsored by Ben Lake.

== Sub-national bodies ==
There are also local collaborative bodies between local authorities in Wales. The Local Government and Elections (Wales) Act 2021 established four regional Corporate Joint Committees (CJCs) throughout Wales. Each CJC is led by a board of leaders from principal councils and national park authorities within its area. Corporate Joint Committees utilise the powers of its member principal councils, relating to economic well-being, strategic planning and regional transport. They are corporate bodies which can employ staff, hold assets and have dedicated budgets just like one of its member councils would. Each CJC area is subject to a city deal or growth deal.

== Currently devolved powers ==
The powers currently employed by the Senedd are, in summary:

- Agriculture, forestry and fishing
- Education
- Environment
- Health and social care
- Housing
- Local government
- Highways and transport
- Some control over income tax, stamp duty and landfill tax
- Welsh language

The Government of Wales Act 2006 separated the Welsh Assembly Government and the National Assembly for Wales, and gave the assembly more powers on more "fields". The Wales Act 2014 allowed the Senedd the following; legislate devolved taxes, allows the Senedd to set income tax rates for Wales, give Welsh Ministers borrowing powers, and the power for borrowing in order to fund capital spending (with the consent of UK Treasury). In addition, increasing the Senedd term from 4 to 5 years, no restriction on standing as a Senedd constituency member and Senedd regional member, prevents someone from being both an MP and MS, Welsh Assembly Government renamed Welsh Government, Local Government and Housing Act 1989: limits on housing debts incurred by local housing authorities in Wales with a Housing Revenue Account, and the Law Commission to provide advice and assistance to Welsh Ministers & Welsh ministers to report how Law Commission recommendations are implemented in Wales.

Following the Wales Act 2017, a reserved powers model was adopted, where only a list of reserved powers to the UK Parliament is given, in which the Senedd cannot legislate on. Any matter not reserved to the UK Parliament can be affected by legislation from the Senedd. General reservations include: the Constitution, public service, political parties, single legal jurisdiction of England and Wales, tribunals, foreign affairs etc. and defence. There are also many other specific reservations, in sectors such as finance and economy, home affairs, trade and industry, energy, transport, social security including pensions, professions, employment, health safety, media, justice, land assets, and others. While certain restrictions are set out on the Senedd's powers.

== Proposed further devolution ==
The following options have been proposed as a systematic and constitutional change to autonomy in Wales by The Independent Commission on the Constitutional Future of Wales.

1. Entrenched devolution
2. Federal structures
3. Independence

Among calls for specific matters to be devolved to Wales are powers over; Broadcasting, the Crown Estate in Wales and natural resources, Shared Prosperity Fund, bank holidays, energy firm taxation & regulation, gender self-identification, the justice system, rail infrastructure, setting rates and bands of all income tax, welfare system and full taxation powers.

== Limitations relating to reserved matters ==
Welsh devolution operates on a reserved powers model with specific areas being "reserved" to be the responsibility of the UK Parliament, including the Crown, the union, the UK Parliament, defence, national security, foreign affairs, immigration, fiscal policy, monetary policy, energy (with some exceptions), broadcasting, and telecommunications. Furthermore, justice and policing is also reserved, therefore other matters such as measures addressing anti-social behaviour and alcohol licensing are too.

Acts of Senedd Cymru are restricted constitutionally. They must not modify the law on reserved matters, cannot generally modify private law (such as contract, tort and property) unless for a devolved purpose, and they cannot modify certain criminal offences or criminal law procedures. Welsh legislation cannot modify protected enactments such as the Human Rights Act 1998 or the Civil Contingencies Act 2004, and cannot confer functions on reserved authorities without UK Government consent.

The UK Parliament has since passed the UK Internal Market Act in 2020, which establishes the presumption that, in general, goods, services and professional qualifications that are sold or recognised in other parts of the UK, should be able to be sold or recognised in any other part of the UK, regardless of local laws. The act however does not affect the ability of the Senedd to pass laws in its devolved areas (the Senedd's legislative competence), but it does impact the practicalness of enforcing its laws.

The Scottish Government states that the act "directly constrains devolution", it may cause the regulation of service in one part of the UK to be recognised across the whole UK, and would allow UK ministers to intervene on devolved policies without the approval of the devolved parliament. The Senedd refused to provide consent for the act itself. The Welsh Government has also voiced concerns over the United Kingdom Internal Market Act 2020, passed by the UK Parliament, describing its passing as an "attack on its competence".

The Welsh Government launched a request for judicial review of the act, which was rejected on the ground of being premature by the divisional court. As of February 2022, the Welsh government awaited an appeal of the divisional court's decision.

=== Intervention powers ===
The Secretary of State for Wales possesses intervention powers under section 114 of the Government of Wales Act 2006. They may make an order prohibiting the submission of a Senedd bill for Royal Assent if they have reasonable grounds to believe the bill would have an adverse effect on reserved matters, would be incompatible with international obligations, or would affect the interests of defence or national security. This power has never been used in relation to Welsh legislation, although the equivalent section 35 power in Scotland was used for the first time in 2023.

== Assessment of devolution ==
Ron Davies, former secretary of state for Wales and described as the architect of devolution said in 2022, "One thing which I know is lacking is an overarching sense of wanting to create a better way, of wanting to shape our own destiny. I don't see that." His deputy, Peter Hain said "We need to do what we all say we want to do, which is create a more vibrant, competitive, successful Wales economically. But it does mean some pretty tough decisions." Former leader of Plaid Cymru, Dafydd Wigley stated "We have yet to see the election in Wales, changing the colour of a government. And democracy in Wales will not have been properly tested until that happens." Originally the leader of the No campaign in the 90s, Conservative Nick Bourne now supports more members for the Senedd "We need more members. It's got expanded powers, it's the settled will of the people that we have a Welsh parliament, and that's got to be effective, so by all means, be concerned about value for money, we should be, as any political party should be, but in terms of is it a good idea then the personal view is we need more members."

=== Economic impact ===
In a report for the Institute of Welsh Affairs in 2003, Phil Cooke of Cardiff University argued that the Welsh Government had responded to the loss of productivity in manufacturing by substituting new jobs in the public sector, making Wales increasingly dependent on fiscal transfers from Whitehall. Cooke suggested that a relatively weak devolution settlement had prevented the Welsh Government from developing innovative economic policies, especially when compared to Scotland. However, critics including former Welsh Secretary Ron Davies and John Lovering, another Cardiff academic, claimed that Cooke's argument that a more powerful Assembly was a necessary precondition to more effective economic policies was a non-sequitur.

In 2005, Plaid Cymru leader Ieuan Wyn Jones suggested that the lack of tax varying powers in Wales was a major reason why Wales did not have its own Celtic Tiger and that growth strategy should not be focused only on cities. Plaid Cymru have also argued that economic dividend can only be achieved with Welsh independence.

Jonathan Bradbury and Andrew Davies published an article in the National Institute Economic Review in January 2023 criticising both the Welsh government and UK government economic policies for Wales. They note that Wales had one of the weakest economies of the UK prior to devolution. They also noted views that the UK government remained in control of macro-economic powers; lacked regional economic policy; and a lack of devolution to the Welsh government to make a real difference. They also note the view of some that the historic exploitation of Wales and its treatment as an economic periphery plays have implications today. They added that Wales's economic performance has not progressed under devolution with weakness in Welsh government strategy and policy and that the dissolution of the Wales Development Agency remains a topic of debate.

== Political party position on devolution ==
Welsh Labour and the Welsh Liberal Democrats support further devolution for Wales, as well as reform/federalism of the United Kingdom. Plaid Cymru, Wales Green Party, Gwlad and Propel support further devolution for Wales as well as independence. The Welsh Conservatives support the devolution system as it currently stands. The UK Independence Party and Abolish the Welsh Assembly Party both support reduced or the abolishment of devolution.

== Referendum results ==
Referendums on devolution
Date Conducted	Question/Statement	Support Devolution (%)	Against Devolution (%)	Turnout (%)
3 March 2011	Do you want the Assembly now to be able to make laws on all matters in the 20 subject areas it has powers for?	63.5	36.5	35.2
18 September 1997	(i) I agree that there should be a Welsh Assembly; or (ii) I do not agree that there should be a Welsh Assembly	50.3	49.7	51.3
1 March 1979	Do you want the provisions of the Wales Act 1978 to be put into effect?	20.3	79.7	58.8

== General sources ==
- Davies, John (1994). A History of Wales. London: Penguin. ISBN 978-0-14-014581-6.
