= 1979 Welsh devolution referendum =

1979 referendum in Wales

- 1 March 1979
- Do you want the Provisions of the Wales Act 1978 to be put into effect?

Results
Choice	Votes	%
Yes	243,048	20.26%
No	956,330	79.74%
Valid votes	1,199,378	99.72%
Invalid or blank votes	3,309	0.28%
Total votes	1,202,687	100.00%
Registered voters/turnout	2,038,048	59.01%
- 1. Gwent; 2. South Glamorgan; 3. Mid Glamorgan; 4. West Glamorgan; 5. Dyfed; 6. Powys; 7. Gwynedd; 8. Clwyd; Results by county

The 1979 Welsh devolution referendum was a post-legislative referendum held on 1 March 1979 (Saint David's Day) to decide whether there was sufficient support for a Welsh Assembly among the Welsh electorate. The referendum was held under the terms of the Wales Act 1978 drawn up to implement proposals made by the Kilbrandon Report published in 1973.

The plans were defeated by a majority of 4:1 (20.3% for and 79.7% against) with only 12% of the Welsh electorate voting in favour of establishing an assembly. A second referendum to create a devolved assembly for Wales was held in 1997, which led to the enactment of the Government of Wales Act 1998 and the creation of the National Assembly for Wales in 1999.

== Background ==
Both the Scotland Act and the Wales Act contained a requirement that at least 40% of all voters back the plan. It had been passed as an amendment by Islington South MP George Cunningham with the backing of Bedwellty MP Neil Kinnock.

Kinnock, the future leader of the Labour Party, called himself a "unionist". His stated view was that "between the mid-sixteenth century and the mid-eighteenth century Wales had practically no history at all, and even before that it was the history of rural brigands who have been ennobled by being called princes". He was one of six south Wales Labour MPs who opposed their own Government's plans, along with Leo Abse (Pontypool), Donald Anderson (Swansea East), Ioan Evans (Aberdare), Fred Evans (Caerphilly), and Ifor Davies (Gower).

The government of James Callaghan did not have an overall majority in the House of Commons, and was therefore vulnerable to opposition from within its own ranks. The Labour party was split on home rule for Wales with a vocal minority opposed. They considered devolution as a danger to the unity of the UK and a concession to Welsh nationalism in the wake of by-election victories by Plaid Cymru.

The Labour Party committed itself to devolution after coming to power in the February 1974 General Election. It followed the findings of a Royal Commission on the Constitution under Lord Kilbrandon. Set up in 1969 in the wake of pressure to address growing support for independence in Scotland and Wales it delivered a split report in 1973. The Royal Commission recommended legislative and executive devolution to Scotland and Wales, with a minority supporting advisory Regional Councils for England. This plan was rejected as too bureaucratic and ill-advised in economic terms. New plans were brought forward by Harold Wilson's government in 1975 and 1976 which confined devolution to Scotland and Wales.

The Scotland and Wales Bill had a difficult passage through Parliament and the government, lacking a majority to pass the plan, withdrew the legislation and introduced separate Bills for Scotland and Wales. Hostile Labour MPs from the north of England, Wales and Scotland combined to insist that Assemblies could only be passed if directly endorsed by voters in a post-legislative referendum.

In 1978, John Morris, Baron Morris of Aberavon was under the impression that James Callaghan would call a general election in the autumn, but called it off. On 1 March, Saint David's Day, the devolution referendum was held but came at the end of the Winter of Discontent. Factors such as "tribalism" divisions within Wales and impressions that a Welsh Assembly would be dominated by people of one particular region could have potentially caused the proposal to be rejected.

== Result ==
Choice	Votes	%
Yes / Ydwyf	243,048	20.26
No / Nac Ydwyf	956,330	79.74
Total	1,199,378	100.00
Valid votes	1,199,378	99.72
Invalid/blank votes	3,309	0.28
Total votes	1,202,687	100.00
Registered voters/turnout	2,038,048	59.01
Source: BBC

National referendum results (excluding invalid votes)
Yes/Ydwyf; 243,048 (20.3%)	No/Nac Ydwyf; 956,330 (79.7%)
▲50%

=== By Counting area ===
Council Area	Turnout	Votes		Proportion of votes	
Council Area	Turnout	Yes	No	Yes	No
Clwyd	51.1%	31,384	114,119	21.6%	78.4%
Dyfed	64.6%	44,849	114,947	28.1%	71.9%
Gwent	55.3%	21,369	155,389	12.1%	87.9%
Gwynedd	63.4%	37,363	71,157	34.4%	65.6%
Glamorgan (Mid)	58.6%	46,747	184,196	20.2%	79.8%
Glamorgan (South)	58.1%	21,830	144,186	13.1%	86.9%
Glamorgan (West)	57.5%	29,663	128,834	18.5%	81.5%
Powys	66.0%	9,843	43,502	18.7%	81.3%

== Aftermath ==
The referendums in Scotland and Wales coincided with a period of unpopularity for the Government during the period known as the Winter of Discontent in addition to "tribalism" divisions within Wales and impressions that the National Assembly for Wales would be dominated by people of one particular region. According to John Morris, people in southern Wales were persuaded by the No campaign that the Assembly would be dominated by "bigoted Welsh-speakers from the north and the west" whilst in northern Wales, people had been convinced the Assembly would be a dominated Glamorgan County Council "Taffia". These factors led to a failed devolution referendum.

Proposals for a more powerful Assembly in Scotland attracted the support of a majority of those who voted (1,230,937 for, 1,153,502 against) (see 1979 Scottish devolution referendum), but it amounted to just 32.5% of the total electorate, lower than the 40% threshold required.

The results sealed the fate of the minority Labour government, and as a direct result of the defeat of the referendums in Wales and Scotland the Scottish National Party (SNP) withdrew its support for the government, though Plaid Cymru supported the government in exchange for political concessions.

In the House of Commons on 28 March 1979, the Labour government was defeated on a motion of no confidence by one vote, only the second time in the 20th century that a government was brought down in this way. Labour's defeat in the 1979 General Election to Margaret Thatcher's Conservative Party precipitated a civil war within its own ranks, and the party was to be out of office for eighteen years.

== See also ==
- Welsh Assembly (Wales Act 1978)
- Welsh devolution
