= Welsh Assembly (Wales Act 1978) =

1978 proposed Welsh legislature

In 1978, the Welsh Assembly (Welsh: Cynulliad Cymru) was a proposed legislature for Wales that would have acquired a set list of devolved powers from the Parliament of the United Kingdom. Provisions to establish the assembly were set out in the Wales Act 1978, subject to a post-legislative referendum. The assembly was not established as the proposals were defeated in the 1979 Welsh devolution referendum.

A devolved Welsh assembly would not become a reality until 1999 following the 1997 Welsh devolution referendum leading to the Government of Wales Act 1998 establishing a National Assembly for Wales, now the Senedd (or Welsh Parliament).

== Structure ==
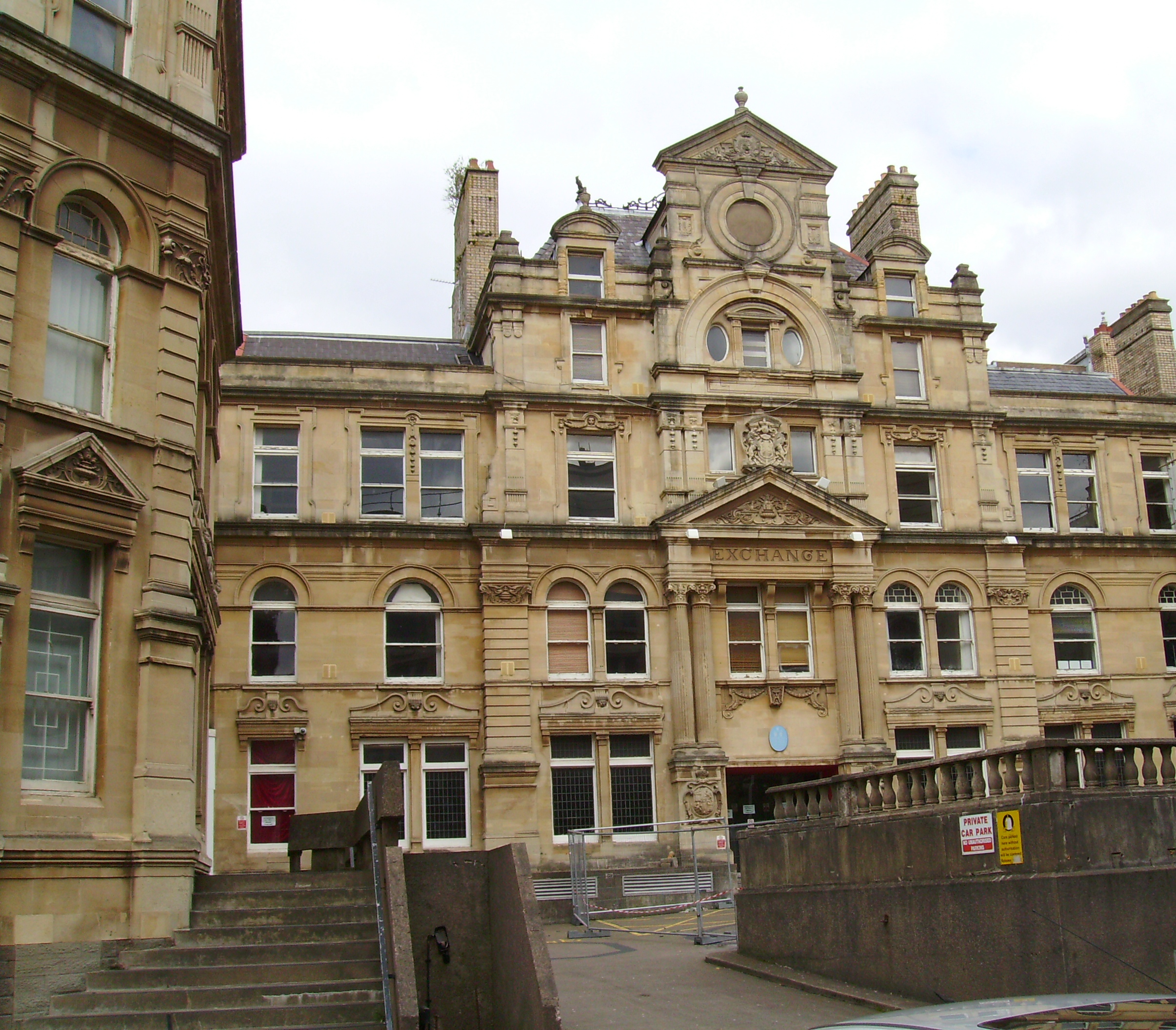
The Welsh Assembly would have met at the Coal Exchange in Cardiff

The proposed assembly would have had 72 members elected by the first-past-the-post system, with each Westminster constituency returning either two or three assembly members.

It was planned that the assembly would have operated under the committee system, with subject committees formed with representation of all groups in the assembly. An executive committee would have been formed, made up of the chairs of the various subject committees and other members selected by the assembly. A Chairman of the executive committee would have been selected, who would also serve as Leader of the Assembly.

It was proposed that the assembly would have met at the Coal Exchange in Cardiff.

== Powers and legislation ==
The Wales Act 1978 proposed to create a Welsh Assembly without primary legislative or tax raising powers. The assembly would have had the power to pass secondary legislation, but responsibility for primary legislation would have remained with the UK Parliament at Westminster. It would have taken over the powers and functions of the Secretary of State for Wales.

The proposed assembly would have had responsibility for:

- housing
- health
- education
- planning
- management of the Welsh Development Agency
- appointments to Welsh quangos.

It would have been able to aid the development of:

- the Welsh language
- museums and galleries
- libraries
- arts and crafts
- sport
- culture
- recreation.

== See also ==
- Council of Wales and the Marches
- Council for Wales and Monmouthshire
- Senedd
- Welsh devolution
- Scottish Assembly
