= Royal Commission on the Constitution (United Kingdom) =

UK enquiry 1969–1973

The Royal Commission on the Constitution, also referred to as the Kilbrandon Commission (initially the Crowther Commission) or Kilbrandon Report, was a long-running royal commission set up by Harold Wilson's Labour government to examine the structures of the constitution of the United Kingdom and the British Islands and the government of its constituent countries, and to consider whether any changes should be made to those structures. It was started under Lord Crowther on 15 April 1969, Lord Kilbrandon took over in 1972, and it finally reported on 31 October 1973.

Various models of devolution, federalism and confederalism were considered, as well as the prospect of the division of the UK into separate sovereign states. Northern Ireland, the Channel Islands and the Isle of Man were dealt with separately from the core issue of Scotland and Wales.

A total of 16 volumes of evidence and 10 research papers were published between 1969 and 1973. The final report was delivered to Edward Heath's Conservative Government, which had come to power at the general election in June 1970. The report rejected the options of independence or federalism, in favour of devolved, directly elected Scottish and Welsh assemblies. Two members of the commission, Lord Crowther-Hunt and Professor Alan Peacock, did not sign the report, disagreeing with the interpretation of the terms of reference and the conclusions. Their views were published in a separate Memorandum of Dissent.

== Background ==
The royal commission was set up in response to growing demands for home rule or full independence for Wales and Scotland, which came into public focus after the ground-breaking by-election wins of Plaid Cymru's Gwynfor Evans at the 1966 Carmarthen by-election, and the Scottish National Party's Winnie Ewing in Hamilton in 1967.

== Terms of reference ==
The commission's terms of reference were:

- To examine the present functions of the present legislature and government in relation to the several countries, nations and regions of the United Kingdom;
- To consider, having regard to changes in local government organisation and in the administrative and other relationships between the various parts of the United Kingdom, and to the interests of the prosperity and good government and our people under the Crown, whether any changes are desirable in those functions or otherwise in present constitutional and economic relationships;
- To consider also whether any changes are desirable in the constitutional and economic relationships between the Channel Islands and the Isle of Man.

== Membership ==
Chairmen:

- Lord Crowther (1969 until his death in February 1972)
- Lord Kilbrandon (from February 1972).

Members:

- David Basnett (resigned before 1973)
- Lord Crowther-Hunt
- Alun Talfan Davies QC
- Lord Foot
- Sir Mark Henig
- Douglas Houghton (resigned before 1973)
- Selwyn Lloyd (resigned before 1973)
- Rt Rev Dr James Longmuir
- Professor Francis Headon Newark
- Professor Alan T. Peacock (appointed 1970)
- Sir David Renton
- Professor Donald James Robertson (died 1970)
- Sir James Steel
- Professor Harry Street
- Sir Ben Bowen Thomas
- Nancy Trenaman

== Proposals ==
The commission was unable to reach unanimous agreement, with the final report including a number of options supported by different members. Two commissioners did not sign the report, producing instead a memorandum of dissent.

=== Scotland ===
Eight members favoured a devolved legislature for Scotland. Executive power would be exercised by ministers appointed by the Crown from members of a directly elected assembly. Areas of responsibility to be transferred to the devolved body would be some of those already under the supervision of the Secretary of State for Scotland and the Lord Advocate. These included:

- Education
- The environment
- Health
- Home affairs
- Legal matters
- Social services

Responsibility for agriculture, fisheries and food would be divided between the Assembly and the United Kingdom government, while the latter would retain control of electricity supply.

With the establishment of the devolved government, it was proposed that the number of MPs elected to Westminster from Scottish constituencies would be reduced from 71 to about 51.

The assembly was to be a single chamber body of about 100 members, elected under the single transferable vote system of proportional representation, with multi-member constituencies. The Commission did not propose to give the assembly a name, feeling this was a matter for the Scottish people, although the term "convention" had been suggested. The determination of the number of seats and boundaries was to be reserved to the United Kingdom parliament.

The new constitutional arrangements would not require the appointment of a governor, while the title "Scottish Premier" was suggested for the head of the executive.

The office of Secretary of State for Scotland would be abolished, although a cabinet minister would continue to have special responsibility in representing Scotland as well as having other duties.

=== Wales ===
Six commissioners favoured legislative devolution for Wales. This would be similar to the scheme envisaged for Scotland, but with less responsibility in legal affairs, reflecting that Scotland had a discrete legal system separate from England and Wales.

As in Scotland, a 100-member unicameral assembly was proposed, elected by proportional representation. A title suggested to the commission for the body was "Senate". Similarly, the head of the executive might be titled "Welsh Premier", and the office of Secretary of State for Wales would be abolished. The number of Westminster MPs elected by Welsh constituencies would be reduced from 36 to about 31.

=== England ===
The signatories to the main report were unanimous in their opposition of legislative devolution to England as a whole, or to any English region. There were however proposals for some powers being devolved to regional level:

- Eight members supported the idea of non-executive co-ordinating and advisory councils to make representations and give advice to central government on government policy affecting the regions. Each council was to have about 60 members, the majority elected by local authorities in the region with about 20% nominated by the minister responsible for regional affairs to represent industry, agriculture, commerce, trade unions, and statutory promotional bodies in the region.
- Two members favoured the establishment of regional assemblies with executive powers, elected in a similar manner to those in Scotland and Wales.

In each case the regions to be used were to be those already established for economic planning, with boundaries adjusted to reflect the changes made by the Local Government Act 1972, although names were not suggested:

1. Cleveland, Cumbria, Durham, Northumberland, Tyne and Wear
2. Humberside, North Yorkshire, South Yorkshire, West Yorkshire
3. Cheshire, Greater Manchester, Merseyside, Lancashire
4. Derbyshire, Leicestershire, Lincolnshire, Northamptonshire, Nottinghamshire
5. Hereford and Worcester, Salop, Staffordshire, Warwickshire, West Midlands
6. Cambridgeshire, Norfolk, Suffolk
7. Avon, Cornwall, Devon, Dorset, Gloucestershire, Somerset, Wiltshire
8. Bedfordshire, Berkshire, Buckinghamshire, East Sussex, Essex, Greater London, Hampshire, Hertfordshire, Isle of Wight, Kent, Oxfordshire, Surrey, West Sussex

==== Cornwall ====
The Commission recognised that "a very small minority" in Cornwall existed that claimed a separate national identity for the Cornish people, and who wished to have separate arrangements for their government. They however felt that "despite its individual character and strong sense of regional identity, there is no evidence that its people have a wish to see it separated for the purposes of government from the rest of England". However they recognised that "the people of Cornwall regard their part of the United Kingdom as not just another English county" and accordingly they recommended that the designation "Duchy of Cornwall" be used on all appropriate occasions to emphasise the "special relationship and the territorial integrity of Cornwall".

=== Northern Ireland ===
The Commission did not make any recommendations on devolution in Northern Ireland, for which the Northern Ireland Constitution Act 1973 had made provision. However, the report did recommend that the number of Westminster MPs from the province be increased in line with the rest of the UK, from 12 to about 17.

=== Channel Islands and the Isle of Man ===
The Commission did not propose to make any changes in the relationship between the United Kingdom, the Channel Islands and the Isle of Man. They rejected a suggestion that responsibilities for external affairs be divided between the UK and island governments, but supported a Home Office proposal that a more formal process of consultation be carried out in future over the application of international agreements in the islands.

== Memorandum of dissent ==
Lord Crowther-Hunt and Professor Peacock did not sign the report, producing a separate series of proposals in a minority memorandum. The main differences between the document and the main report were:

=== Regional assemblies ===
There would be seven elected regional assemblies, one for Scotland, one for Wales and five regional assemblies in England. They would have considerably greater powers than proposed in the majority report, taking over much of the machinery of central government within their area, and each having their own civil service. They would also replace ad-hoc authorities such as regional health authorities and water authorities, which were due to be introduced in reorganisation of the National Health Service and water industry. They would also have supervisory powers over gas and electricity boards. They would also be able to make policy through strategic plans for the physical, social and economic development of their regions.

A Minister for the Regions would hold a cabinet seat.

=== Commons reform ===
The memorandum also suggested changes in the function of the House of Commons. Members of parliament were to form "functional committees" corresponding to central government departments. Each committee was to have a supporting staff and would consider the implications of both United Kingdom and European legislation, as well as having policy-making powers. To reflect their greater responsibilities, MPs would be paid full-time professional salaries.

== Political reaction ==
There was mixed reaction to the commission's report:

- The chairman of Plaid Cymru regarded it as a "real breakthrough", and called for the government to provide a commitment to introduce a Welsh government with legislative power. However, they called for the assembly to have additional powers over economic and industrial planning.
- Winnie Ewing, vice-chairman of the Scottish National Party, described it as a "step in the right direction", and that the proposed Scottish assembly "would lead to the self-government the SNP sought".
- The secretary of the Welsh Labour Party welcomed the introduction of an assembly, but opposed the reduction in the number of Westminster MPs.
- The leader of the Welsh Liberal Party believed it to be a "major breakthrough" which would lead to proportional representation being introduced in Westminster.
- An official of the Welsh Conservative Party called for people not to be "over-influenced by the vocal minority, which includes extremists and nationalist fanatics."
- The chairman of the Scottish Conservative and Unionist Party expressed doubts about the reduction in the number of MPs.
- The secretary of Mebyon Kernow, while noting that their proposal for a Cornish Regional Council had been rejected, said they were encouraged by the establishment of assemblies in Scotland and Wales, and the emphasis on the "Duchy of Cornwall".

== Consequences ==
Following a change of government at the February 1974 election, the new Labour administration published a white paper Democracy and Devolution: Proposals for Scotland and Wales based on the final report in September 1974. The white paper led directly to the unsuccessful Scotland and Wales Bill, which was withdrawn in February 1977. Two separate pieces of legislation were passed in the following year: the Scotland Act 1978 and the Wales Act 1978. The provisions of the Acts would not come into force unless approved by referendums, and accordingly Scottish and Welsh devolution referendums were held on 1 March 1979. The Welsh assembly was rejected by a majority of voters, while Scottish devolution was supported by 51.6% of those voting, or 32.9% of those on the electoral register. An amendment to the Scotland Act, introduced by government backbencher George Cunningham, had specified that it must have the support of 40% of the entire electorate, and the referendum was lost. The results of the referendums led to the repeal of the respective Acts in March 1979. A vote of no confidence was subsequently lost by the government on 28 March when the Scottish National Party voted with the Conservatives, Liberals and Ulster Unionist Party, leading to the general election of 1979 and the beginning of 18 years of Conservative rule.

Scottish and Welsh devolution was finally implemented under the next Labour government, elected in 1997, by the Scotland Act 1998 and the Government of Wales Act 1998.

== See also ==
- Commonwealth of Britain Bill
- Constitutional reform in the United Kingdom
- Constitutional status of Cornwall
- Cornish nationalism
- Declaration of Perth (1968)
- Devolution in the United Kingdom

== Publications ==
Title	Details	Date	ID	Pages
Volume I: Report		Oct 1973	Cmnd. 5460; ISBN 0 10 154600 9	xxxii + 579
Volume II: Memorandum of Dissent (Note: (Free) registration is required to read the linked text.)	by Lord Crowther-Hunt and Professor A. T. Peacock	Oct 1973	Cmnd. 5460–I; ISBN 0 10 154601 7	xxii + 223
Written Evidence 1	The Welsh Office	1969	SBN 11 730005 5	iii + 23
Written Evidence 2	The Scottish Office; Lord Advocate's Department and the Crown Office	1969	SBN 11 730006 3	iv + 80
Written Evidence 3	The Home Office (Note on the Status of Northern Ireland Within the United Kingdom); Government Departments of Northern Ireland	1969	SBN 11 730007 1	iii + 52
Written Evidence 4	Civil Service Department; Department of Economic Affairs; Ministry of Housing and Local Government; Post Office; Ministry of Power; Board of Trade; Ministry of Transport	1970	SBN 11 730008 X	v + 129
Minutes of Evidence I: Wales	13–16 September 1969 Witnesses: Sir Goronwy Daniel, K.C.V.O., C.B., Permanent Under-Secretary of State, Welsh Office; The Lord Ogmore; Plaid Cymru; Mr. Gwilym Prys Davies; 19 November 1969 Witness: Welsh Office	1970	SBN 11 730030 6	119
Minutes of Evidence II: Scotland	29–30 September 1969 Witnesses: Scottish Development Department; Scottish Home and Health Department; The Church of Scotland: Church and Nation Committee; The Scottish National Party; 21 November 1969 Witnesses: Department of Agriculture and Fisheries for Scotland; Scottish Education Department	1970	SBN 11 730031 4	113
Minutes of Evidence III: Northern Ireland	11 February 1970 Witnesses: Ministry of Finance; Parliamentary Draftsman's Office; Ministry of Development; Ministry of Home Affairs; Ministry of Agriculture; 12 February 1970 Witnesses: Ulster Unionist Council; Northern Ireland Committee of the Irish Congress of Trade Unions; Northern Ireland Labour Party; Ministry of Health and Social Services; Ministry of Commerce; Ministry of Education; 6 May 1970 Witnesses: Ulster Liberal Party; Nationalist Party; New Ulster Movement; Northern Ireland Council of the Confederation of British Industry; Northern Ireland Civil Rights Association	1971	SBN 11 730032 2	192
Minutes of Evidence IV: Scotland	4–5 May 1970 Witnesses: Scottish Liberal Party; Scottish Council of the Labour Party; Scottish National Party; Scottish Committee of the Communist Party; Confederation of British Industry (Scotland); Scottish Council (Development and Industry); Dr. Gavin McCrone; 20 July 1970 Witnesses: Scottish Trades Union Congress; Scottish Chamber of Commerce; Highlands and Islands Development Board	1971	SBN 11 730033 0	158
