= Wales Act 1978 =

Act of the Parliament of the United Kingdom

Wales Act 1978 (Note: Section 82.)
- Act of Parliament
- Parliament of the United Kingdom
- Long title: An Act to provide for changes in the government of Wales and in the constitution and functions of certain public bodies.
- Citation: 1978 c. 52
- Introduced by: Michael Foot
- Territorial extent: United Kingdom

Dates
- Royal assent: 31 July 1978
- Commencement: various (Note: Section 79.)
- Repealed: 26 July 1989
Other legislation
Amended by	Vaccine Damage Payments Act 1979; Ancient Monuments and Archaeological Areas Act 1979
Repealed by	Wales Act 1978 (Repeal) Order 1979
Relates to	Scotland Act 1978; Government of Wales Act 1998

Status: Repealed

Text of statute as originally enacted

The Wales Act 1978 (c. 52) was an act of the Parliament of the United Kingdom intended to introduce a limited measure of self-government in Wales through the creation of a Welsh Assembly. The act never took effect as a result of the "no" vote in 1979 Welsh devolution referendum and was repealed in 1979.

== Provisions ==
The act envisaged no separation between the executive and the legislature, similarly to the Government of Wales Act 1998.

=== Referendum and repeal ===
The Wales Act 1978 included a requirement for a "post-legislative" referendum to be held in Wales to approve the Act's coming into force.

The referendum was held on 1 March 1979. The proposal was defeated with a total of 243,048 (20.26%) voting favour of an Assembly and 956,330 (79.74%) voting against.

As a result of the negative referendum outcome, the Act never took effect, and was repealed in accordance with the Act's own provisions by the Wales Act 1978 (Repeal) Order 1979.

== See also ==
- Welsh Assembly (Wales Act 1978)
- Government of Wales Act 1998
- Scotland Act 1978
