= George Cunningham (British politician) =

British politician (1931–2018)

Member of Parliament for Islington South and Finsbury Islington South West (1970–Feb 1974)
- In office 18 June 1970 – 13 May 1983
- Preceded by: Albert Evans
- Succeeded by: Chris Smith

Personal details
- Born: 10 June 1931; Dunfermline
- Died: 27 July 2018 (aged 87)

George Cunningham (10 June 1931 – 27 July 2018) was a British politician who is known for introducing an amendment to the 1979 Scottish devolution referendum that resulted in the devolution act being repealed even though a majority voted in favour.

== Early life ==
Born in Dunfermline, Cunningham was educated at Dunfermline High School, Blackpool Grammar School and the University of Manchester. He worked for the Labour Party as its Commonwealth officer.

== Political career ==
Cunningham contested Henley at the 1966 general election as the Labour candidate. He was first elected as Member of Parliament (MP) for Islington South West at the 1970 general election. After boundary changes, he was elected for Islington South and Finsbury at the February 1974 election.

Cunningham strongly opposed Scottish devolution. At his prompting, the House of Commons accepted an amendment to the Scotland Act 1978 that a majority voting "yes" in the 1979 referendum on establishing a devolved Assembly would have to constitute at least 40 per cent of the Scottish electorate, without which the proposal could be withdrawn and the Act repealed by statutory instrument. Although “yes” won a majority of those voting in the referendum, as the "yes" constituted only 32.9 per cent of the electorate, the Labour government decided it would not proceed with devolution. This prompted the Scottish National Party to withdraw its support for the minority government. The Conservative opposition then tabled a motion of no confidence, in which the government was defeated by one vote. The Conservative Party, which was opposed to devolution, won the subsequent general election; the Scotland Act was repealed in June 1979.

=== Social Democratic Party ===
In November 1981, Cunningham resigned from the Labour Party and sat as an independent Labour MP, before becoming one of the later ex-Labour defectors to the recently founded Social Democratic Party in June 1982. Cunningham lost his seat by just 363 votes (1%) at the 1983 general election to Labour candidate Chris Smith. He contested the seat again at the 1987 general election when he lost by a similarly narrow margin (the only defecting former Labour MP who came close to regaining their seat that year) and never re-entered the House of Commons.

== Personal life ==
Cunningham married Mavis Walton in 1957 and they had two children, Andrew and Helen. Mavis, who unsuccessfully contested Twickenham for Labour in the October 1974 election, pre-deceased her husband. Cunningham died in 2018.

== See also ==
- Scotland Act 1978
- 1979 Welsh devolution referendum

Parliament of the United Kingdom
Preceded by Albert Evans	Member of Parliament for Islington South West; 1970–1974	Constituency abolished
New constituency	Member of Parliament for Islington South and Finsbury; 1974–1983	Succeeded by Chris Smith
