= Government of Wales Act 1998 =

Act of the Parliament of the United Kingdom

Government of Wales Act 1998 (Note: Section 159.)
- Act of Parliament
- Parliament of the United Kingdom
- Long title: An Act to establish and make provision about the National Assembly for Wales and the offices of Auditor General for Wales and Welsh Administration Ombudsman; to reform certain Welsh public bodies and abolish certain other Welsh public bodies; and for connected purposes.
- Citation: 1998 c. 38
- Introduced by: Ron Davies MP, Secretary of State for Wales (Commons); Lord Williams of Mostyn Parliamentary Under-Secretary of State, Home Office (Lords)
- Territorial extent: United Kingdom

Dates
- Royal assent: 31 July 1998
- Commencement: Various (Note: Section 158.)
Other legislation
Amends	Act of Settlement 1701; Finance Act 1969; House of Commons Disqualification Act 1975; Rent Act 1977; Protection from Eviction Act 1977; Criminal Law Act 1977; Law Reform (Miscellaneous Provisions) (Scotland) Act 1980; New Towns and Urban Development Corporations Act 1985; Housing Associations Act 1985; Airports Act 1986; Planning (Consequential Provisions) Act 1990; Water Industry Act 1991; Social Security Administration Act 1992; Value Added Tax Act 1994; Gas Act 1995; Employment Rights Act 1996
Amended by	Registration of Political Parties Act 1998; Government Resources and Accounts Act 2000; Learning and Skills Act 2000; Race Relations (Amendment) Act 2000; Political Parties, Elections and Referendums Act 2000; Nursing and Midwifery Order 2001; National Health Service Reform and Health Care Professions Act 2002; Justice (Northern Ireland) Act 2002; Regulatory Reform (Housing Assistance) (England and Wales) Order 2002; Health (Wales) Act 2003; Criminal Justice Act 2003; Finance Act 2004; Public Audit (Wales) Act 2004; Public Services Ombudsman (Wales) Act 2005; Constitutional Reform Act 2005; Education Act 2005; Welsh Development Agency (Transfer of Functions to the National Assembly for Wales and Abolition) Order 2005; Qualifications, Curriculum and Assessment Authority for Wales (Transfer of Functions to the National Assembly for Wales and Abolition) Order 2005; Natural Environment and Rural Communities Act 2006; National Lottery Act 2006; Health Act 2006; Commissioner for Older People (Wales) Act 2006; Government of Wales Act 2006; National Health Service (Consequential Provisions) Act 2006; Ancient Monuments Board for Wales (Abolition) Order 2006; Housing and Regeneration Act 2008; Companies Act 2006 (Consequential Amendments etc) Order 2008; Transfer of Tribunal Functions (Lands Tribunal and Miscellaneous Amendments) Order 2009; Housing Corporation (Dissolution) Order 2009; Constitutional Reform and Governance Act 2010; Housing and Regeneration Act 2008 (Consequential Provisions) Order 2010; Education Act 2011Budget Responsibility and National Audit Act 2011; Welsh Language (Wales) Measure 2011 (Transfer of functions, Transitional and Consequential Provisions) Order 2012; Mental Health (Discrimination) Act 2013; Natural Resources Body for Wales (Functions) Order 2013; Natural Resources Body for Wales (Consequential Provision) Order 2013; Wales Act 2014; Wales Act 2017; Neighbourhood Planning Act 2017; European Union (Withdrawal) Act 2018 (Consequential Modifications and Repeals and Revocations) (EU Exit) Regulations 2019; Tertiary Education and Research (Wales) Act 2022 (Consequential Amendments) Regulations 2024; Public Audit (Wales) Act 2013 (Consequential Amendments) Order 2014; Senedd Cymru (Members and Elections) Act 2024; Renters' Rights Act 2025; Legislation (Procedure, Publication and Repeals) (Wales) Act 2025
Relates to	Referendums (Scotland & Wales) Act 1997; Scotland Act 1998; Northern Ireland Act 1998

Status: Partially repealed

Text of statute as originally enacted

Revised text of statute as amended

The Government of Wales Act 1998 (c. 38) (Welsh: Deddf Llywodraeth Cymru 1998) is an act of the Parliament of the United Kingdom. Passed in 1998, the act created the National Assembly for Wales, Auditor General for Wales and transferred devolved powers to the assembly. The act followed the 1997 Welsh devolution referendum.

A bound version of the act was presented to Queen Elizabeth II at the opening ceremony of the National Assembly for Wales at Crickhowell House.

== Provisions ==
The act brought about the then National Assembly for Wales as a corporate body.

Under the 1998 act, the Welsh Assembly received powers to legislate that were previously held by the Secretary of State for Wales. This included for agriculture, forestry, fisheries and food; ancient monuments and historic buildings; culture (including museums, galleries and libraries); economic development; education and training; the environment; health and health services; highways; housing; industry; local government; social services; sport and recreation; tourism; town and country planning; transport; water and flood defence; the Welsh language.

The act also established the Auditor General for Wales and the Welsh Administration Ombudsman and also gave the National Assembly for Wales the ability to reorganise some Welsh public bodies.

== Bill provisions ==
On 26 November 1997, the Government of Wales Bill was first read in the House of Commons of the UK Parliament. This followed the white paper policy objectives in further legal detail and added the "First Secretary" role to lead the executive committee of a "National Assembly" (rather than "Assembly for Wales"). The Assembly would be an independent "corporate body" able to make secondary legislation in devolved areas whereas primary legislation powers would stay at Westminster for all matters.The Welsh Assembly would be funded using a "block grant" similarly to the already existing Welsh Office using the Barnett formula.

Welsh Assembly elections would include one vote for a constituency Assembly Member (AM) and one regional vote of Wales's five electoral regions. 40 constituency AM's were elected "first past the post" and 20 "list" AMs were elected via the D'Hondt method.

Clause 34 of the bill would allow the Assembly to consider “any matter affecting Wales” and a mechanism for potential further transfer of powers to allow the "process" of devolution to continue as suggested by Ron Davies.

The bill became an act on 31 July 1998 and, on 1 July 1999, the Welsh Office was replaced with the "Wales Office".

The bill allowed the records of devolved public bodies to be stored in Wales.

The bill did not give the assembly primary legislative powers.

== Amendments ==
The Government of Wales Act 2006 made several amendments to the act, including primary legislative powers.

== See also ==
- Welsh devolution
- Scotland Act 1998
- Royal Commission on the Constitution (United Kingdom)
