= 1979 Scottish devolution referendum =

Post-legislative referendum

- 1 March 1979
- Do you want the Provisions of the Scotland Act 1978 to be put into effect?

Results
Choice	Votes	%
Yes	1,230,937	51.62%
No	1,153,502	48.38%
Valid votes	2,384,439	99.87%
Invalid or blank votes	3,133	0.13%
Total votes	2,387,572	100.00%
Registered voters/turnout	3,747,112	63.72%
- Results by local voting area Yes: 50–60% No: 50–60% 60–70% 70–80%

A post-legislative referendum was held in Scotland in 1979 to decide whether there was sufficient support among the Scottish electorate for a Scottish Assembly proposed in the Scotland Act 1978. This was an act to create a devolved deliberative assembly for Scotland. A majority (51.6%) of voters supported the proposal, but an amendment to the Act stipulated that it would be repealed if less than 40% of the total electorate voted in favour. As there was a turnout of 64% the "Yes" vote represented only 32.9% of the registered electorate, and the act was subsequently repealed.

A second referendum to create a devolved legislature in Scotland was held in 1997 under a newly elected Labour government, which led to the enactment of the Scotland Act 1998 and the creation of a devolved Scottish Parliament in 1999.

== Background ==
=== Kilbrandon Commission ===
Following the Scottish National Party gaining its first peacetime MP in the 1967 Hamilton by-election and Plaid Cymru's first win at the 1966 Carmarthen by-election in Wales, the United Kingdom government set up the Royal Commission on the Constitution, referred to as the Kilbrandon Commission, in 1969. The royal commission was intended to look at the constitutional structure of the United Kingdom and consider changes that should be made. The final report was published in 1973.

The commission examined various models of devolution, federalism and confederalism, on top of the break-up of the UK into separate sovereign states.

In relation to Scotland, eight of the commission's members supported a Scottish Assembly, via a devolved structure. It would recommend that the assembly would have around 100 members, elected under single transferable vote from multi-member constituencies. The assembly would obtain powers in the areas of education, environment, health, home affairs, legal matters and social services, while agriculture, fisheries and food would be divided between the assembly and the UK government.

=== Previous Legislation ===
After returning to power with a minority government in February 1974 election, Harold Wilson's Labour government published a white paper entitled Democracy and Devolution: Proposals for Scotland and Wales, published in September 1974. The party gained a narrow majority of three seats in the election in October.

By 1976, the Labour government, now led by James Callaghan, had lost its parliamentary majority entirely following a series of adverse by-election results. To provide a stable majority in the House of Commons, the government made an agreement with the Scottish National Party and Plaid Cymru whereby, in return for their support in Commons votes, the government would instigate legislation to devolve political powers from Westminster to Scotland and Wales.

The Scotland and Wales Bill was subsequently introduced in November 1976, but the government struggled to get the legislation through parliament. The Conservative opposition opposed its second reading, and on the first day of committee 350 amendments were put down. Progress slowed to a crawl. In February 1977, the Bill's cabinet sponsor Michael Foot tabled a guillotine motion to attempt to halt the delays. The motion was rejected and the government was forced to withdraw the Bill.

== Scotland Act 1978 ==
The government returned to the issue of devolution in November 1977. Separate bills for Scotland and Wales were published and support from the Liberals was obtained. In spite of continued opposition requiring another guillotine motion, the Bills were passed. During the passage of the Scotland Act 1978 through Parliament, an amendment introduced by Labour MP George Cunningham added a requirement that the bill had to be approved by 40% of the total registered electorate, as well as a simple majority (50% + 1).

== Opinion polling ==
Date(s) conducted	Pollster	Client	Sample size	Yes	No	Don't know	Lead
1 Mar 1979	1979 devolution referendum		–	51.6%	48.4%	N/A	3.2%
1 Mar 1979	Opinion Research Centre (Note: Exit poll.)	ITN	~8,000 (Note: The sample was made up of voters in Scotland and Wales.)	35%	26%	39% (Note: Number of people who said they did not vote.)	9%
27–28 Feb 1979	MORI	Scottish Daily Express	1,003	42%	42%	16%	Tie
24–25 Feb 1979	System Three	Glasgow Herald	1,080	43%	40%	17%	3%
20–22 Feb 1979	MORI	Scottish Daily Express	1,037	54%	33%	12%	21%
12–14 Feb 1979	MORI	LWT Weekend World	1,015	55%	28%	16%	27%
29 Jan – 6 Feb 1979	System Three	Glasgow Herald	1,003	45%	35%	20%	10%
8–20 Jan 1979	System Three	Glasgow Herald	926	52%	29%	19%	23%
26 Sep – 3 Oct 1978	System Three	Glasgow Herald	972	59%	29%	12%	30%
5 Apr 1978	MORI	LWT Weekend World	1,002	63%	27%	10%	36%
30 Jan – 6 Feb 1978	System Three	Glasgow Herald	994	55%	28%	17%	27%
26 Feb – 5 Mar 1977	System Three	Glasgow Herald	978	53%	31%	16%	22%

== Result ==
Do you want the provisions of the Scotland Act 1978 to be put into effect?
Choice	Votes	%
For	1,230,937	51.62
Against	1,153,502	48.38
Total	2,384,439	100.00
Valid votes	2,384,439	99.87
Invalid/blank votes	3,133	0.13
Total votes	2,387,572	100.00
Registered voters/turnout	3,747,112	63.72
Source: House of Commons Library

National referendum results (excluding invalid votes)
Yes; 1,230,937 (51.6%)	No; 1,153,532 (48.4%)
▲50%

Results by counting area
Counting Area	Valid Votes	Turnout (%)	Votes		Proportion of Votes		Proportion of electorate	
Counting Area	Valid Votes	Turnout (%)	Yes	No	Yes	No	Yes	No
Borders	51,526	66.4%	20,746	30,780	40.3%	59.7%	26.7%	39.7%
Central	130,401	65.9%	71,296	59,105	54.7%	45.3%	36.0%	29.9%
Dumfries and Galloway	67,401	64.1%	27,162	40,239	40.3%	59.7%	25.8%	38.2%
Fife	160,688	65.3%	86,252	74,436	53.7%	46.3%	35.0%	30.2%
Grampian	196,429	57.2%	94,944	101,485	48.3%	51.7%	27.6%	29.5%
Highland	88,247	64.7%	44,973	43,274	51.0%	49.0%	33.0%	31.7%
Lothian	373,642	65.9%	187,221	186,421	50.1%	49.9%	33.0%	32.9%
Orkney Islands	7,543	54.1%	2,104	5,439	27.9%	72.1%	15.1%	39.0%
Shetland Islands	7,486	50.3%	2,020	5,466	27.0%	73.0%	13.6%	36.7%
Strathclyde	1,105,118	62.5%	596,519	508,599	54.0%	46.0%	33.7%	28.7%
Tayside	184,807	63.0%	91,482	93,325	49.5%	50.5%	31.2%	31.8%
Western Isles	11,151	49.9%	6,218	4,933	55.8%	44.2%	27.8%	22.1%
Total (Note: The percentage of the electorate voting Yes was 32.5% on an unadjusted basis. After the electoral roll was adjusted for 40,200 ineligible voters (deaths; students and nurses registered at more than one address; prisoners), the % of the electorate voting Yes for the purposes of the Act was 32.9%.)	2,384,439	63.0%	1,230,937	1,153,500	51.6%	48.4%	32.5%	30.5%

== Aftermath ==
Logo used by the Labour Yes campaign.

Logo used by the No campaign.

The result was a majority in favour of devolution. A total of 1,230,937 (51.6%) voted at the referendum in favour of an Assembly, a majority of about 77,400 over those voting against. However, this total represented only 32.9% of the registered electorate as a whole. The Labour government held that the Act's requirements had not been met, and that devolution would therefore not be introduced for Scotland.

In the wake of the referendum the disappointed supporters of the bill conducted a protest campaign under the slogan "Scotland said 'yes'", officially launched in a Glasgow hotel on 7 March 1979. In particular, the Scottish National Party (SNP) carried out a survey of the electoral register in the Edinburgh Central constituency. This appeared to show that the register was so out of date that even in an area where major support for a "yes" vote might be expected, achievement of 40% of the electorate was virtually unattainable. This was because the majority of electors lived in older tenements or newer Council blocks of flats where flat numbers were not specified. The work of electoral registration staff to obtain an accurate current register was almost impossible.

Under the terms of the Act, it could then be repealed by a Statutory instrument to be approved by Parliament. The government's decision to abandon devolution led the SNP to withdraw its support for the Labour government. It was in a minority in Parliament and had relied on deals with the smaller parties, including the SNP, for its survival. After establishing that the Liberals and the SNP would vote against the government in a confidence motion, the Conservative opposition tabled a motion on 28 March. The government was defeated by one vote, and a UK general election was subsequently called. This was won by the Conservatives, and Parliament voted to repeal the Act on 20 June 1979.

A second referendum to create a devolved legislature in Scotland was held in 1997 under a newly elected Labour government, which led to the enactment of the Scotland Act 1998 and the creation of a devolved Scottish Parliament in 1999.

== See also ==
- 2014 Scottish independence referendum
- Scottish independence
- Referendums in the United Kingdom
- Scottish Assembly
- Royal Commission on the Constitution (United Kingdom)
- 1979 Welsh devolution referendum
