= Scotland Act 1978 =

Act of the Parliament of the United Kingdom

Scotland Act 1978 (Note: Section 87.)
- Act of Parliament
- Parliament of the United Kingdom
- Long title: An Act to provide for changes in the government of Scotland and in the procedure of Parliament and in the constitution and functions of certain public bodies.
- Citation: 1978 c. 51
- Introduced by: Michael Foot
- Territorial extent: United Kingdom

Dates
- Royal assent: 31 July 1978
- Commencement: various (Note: Section 83.)
- Repealed: 26 July 1979
Other legislation
Amended by	Vaccine Damage Payments Act 1979; Ancient Monuments and Archaeological Areas Act 1979
Repealed by	Scotland Act 1978 (Repeal) Order 1979 (SI 1979/928)
Relates to	Wales Act 1978; Scotland Act 1978 (Referendum) Order 1978; Scotland Act 1998

Status: Repealed

Text of statute as originally enacted

The Scotland Act 1978 (c. 51) was an act of the Parliament of the United Kingdom intended to establish a Scottish Assembly as a devolved legislature for Scotland. At a referendum held in the following year, the act failed to gain the necessary level of approval required by an amendment, and was never put into effect.

== Background ==
Following Winnie Ewing's groundbreaking win for the Scottish National Party in the 1967 Hamilton by-election, the United Kingdom government responded to the growing support for Scottish independence by setting up the Royal Commission on the Constitution, better known as the Kilbrandon Commission (1969–1973).

In response to the royal commission's report, James Callaghan's Labour government brought forward proposals to establish a Scottish Assembly. In November 1977 a Scotland Bill providing for the establishment of a Scottish Assembly was introduced; it received royal assent on 31 July 1978.

== Referendum and repeal ==
The Scotland Act 1978 included a requirement for a "post-legislative" referendum to be held in Scotland to approve the act's coming into force. During its passage through Parliament, an amendment introduced by George Cunningham (a Scot who represented an London seat) added a further requirement that the approval at the referendum be by 40% of Scotland's total registered electorate, rather than by a simple majority.

The referendum was held on 1 March 1979. A total of 1,230,937 (51.6%) voted at the referendum in favour of an Assembly, a narrow majority of about 77,400 over those voting against. However, this total represented only 32.9% of the registered electorate as a whole. The Labour government accepted that the act's requirements had not been met, and that devolution would therefore not be introduced for Scotland.

Under the terms of the act, it was then repealed by a statutory instrument to be approved by Parliament. The Scottish National Party subsequently voted against the government in a vote of no confidence which led to the resignation of the Callaghan government, and an election was called. The vote to approve the statutory instrument repealing the act was not held until 20 June 1979, by which time a Conservative government had come to power under Margaret Thatcher. The Scotland Act 1978 (Repeal) Order 1979 (SI 1979/928) was subsequently made on 26 July 1979.

== Further developments ==
In 1998 a new Scotland Act was passed, leading to the establishment of the Scottish Parliament. A key difference between the two acts is that under the 1978 legislation a very limited number of specific powers would have been devolved to Scotland, whereas under the 1998 legislation it is the powers reserved to Westminster which are specifically limited; everything not mentioned in the 1998 act is automatically the responsibility of the Scottish Parliament.

== See also ==
- Scottish Constitutional Convention
- 1979 United Kingdom general election
- Wales Act 1978
