= Timeline of Welsh history =

List of significant events in the history of Wales

This is a timeline of Welsh history, comprising important legal and territorial changes, and political events in Wales.

== Mesolithic and Neolithic periods ==
Year	Date	Event
c. 31,000 BC		Earliest reliably-dated "modern human" burial with artefacts, first discovered in the 1820s on the Gower in Swansea. After the Red Lady of Paviland bones were recalibrated in 2009, the (male) Homo sapiens bones were determined to be from 33,000 years ago.
c. 6000 BC		Following the end of glaciation and sea level stabilisation, Wales becomes roughly the shape it is today and is inhabited by Mesolithic hunter-gatherers.
c. 4000 BC		The earliest farming communities become established in Wales, marking the beginning of the Neolithic period. Megalithic tombs still survive from this period, such as the Pentre Ifan Dolmen in Pembrokeshire.

== Bronze and Iron Ages ==
Year	Date	Event
c. 2500–2100 BC		Metal tools first appear, as copper ores are extracted from deep open cast mines in central and northern Wales. Implements are initially made from copper, followed by bronze (made by adding tin and lead to copper).
c. 2500–700 BC		Wales is part of Bronze Age Britain, a maritime trading culture, selling tin, lead, iron, silver, gold, pearls, corn, cattle, hides, skins, fleeces, trained hunting dogs and slaves, and buying ivory, amber, glass vessels and other luxuries; bronze axeheads from this area have been found on the coasts of Brittany and Germany.
c. 650 BC		Implements start to be produced from iron, the earliest examples are believed to come from Llyn Fawr in South Wales.
c. 400 BC		Iron Age settlements emerge in Wales, two of the earliest being Castell Odo, a small hillfort near the tip of the Llŷn Peninsula and Lodge Wood Camp, above the later Roman fort at Caerleon.
c. 150 BC		Gold coins are being minted at least as early as this date, imitating Macedonian designs.
54 BC		Tacitus later (1st century AD) records that Cymry (Welsh people) assisted in repelling Julius Caesar's second invasion.

== 1st century ==
Year	Date	Event
c. 25–75		Celtic chariot burial in southern Britain discovered in Llanstadwell, Pembrokeshire, in 2018
48		The Roman conquest of Wales begins as the Deceangli tribe in the northeast submits to Publius Ostorius Scapula
51		Caratacus, a defeated chieftain from east England, encourages the Silures and Ordovices to attack Roman territories, ultimately unsuccessfully; he is betrayed by the Brigantes and taken to Rome as a prisoner
52		A Roman legion, probably Legio XX Valeria Victrix, is defeated by the Silures
c. 75		The Silures have been defeated; Romans establish Venta Silurum, a market town in the Roman province of Britannia; the modern village of Caerwent in Monmouthshire is built around the Roman ruins; Roman fortress at Caerleon is established for the Legio II Augusta
77		Roman general Gnaeus Julius Agricola subjugates the Ordovices with "much slaughter"
78		Gaius Suetonius Paulinus completes the Roman conquest of Wales, ending with his campaign to capture Anglesey; the conquest has involved at least thirteen campaigns, up to 30,000 soldiers and, due to Wales's particular terrain, the development of new tactics which were subsequently adopted in other parts of the empire

== 2nd century ==
Year	Date	Event
c. 100–200		Roman rule over Britannia is less evident in Wales than in other parts of Britain; there are few Roman settlements, but a number of roads, camps and forts; the Romans exploit resources such as metal ores, and to a lesser extent coal
c. 150		According to Ptolemy, Wales was populated by five indistinct peoples, mostly of Celtic origin: Ordovices, Silures, Demetae, Deceangli and Gangani
c. 162		Llandaff was probably the site of the first Christian church built in Wales

== 3rd century ==
Year	Date	Event
—		Evidence of Christianity in Gwent
—		Hoard of more than 3,000 Roman coins buried in a ceramic pot in Powys, discovered in 2011
c. 280		Vines introduced into Britain, including Glamorganshire; also first established around this time, fruit tree, vegetable and game species not previously indigenous

== 4th century ==
Year	Date	Event
311–313		The edicts of Serdica and Milan allow Christians throughout the Empire to worship without restriction; there had been periods of persecution in Wales, including two martyrdoms: Julius and Aaron
350–369		Influx of settlers from Ireland take advantage of soft Roman rule in Wales
383		Effective end of Roman rule in Wales; de facto Roman ruler Magnus Maximus leaves Wales defenceless when he embarks on a military campaign with considerable forces, and remains on the continent with his troops
c. 389		Irish, Scots and Saxon invaders begin to fill the vacuum left by Magnus Maximus and his garrison

== 5th century ==
Year	Date	Event
410		Roman garrison withdrawn from Britain, followed by the emergence of Welsh kingdoms, principally Gwynedd (north), Demetia (south, subsequently Dyfed) and Powys (east)
c. 430		Germanus of Auxerre promotes Christianity more widely in Wales and, as a former general, puts himself at the forefront of a British force in a confrontation with raiders near Mold
c. 450		Cunedda Wledig (possibly the grandson of a Roman or Romano-Briton with military rank on the border with Scotland) comes "from the north" and founds Gwynedd by driving out the Irish settlers
c. 480		Tydfil, later Saint Tydfil—a daughter of Brychan, king of Brycheiniog (later Brecknockshire)—is murdered at Merthyr
c. 490		Dubricius is appointed archbishop of Caerleon and Llandaff; he founds several colleges, including asylums for the aged and schools for the young

== 6th century ==
Year	Date	Event
c. 500–542		The supposed time of the legendary King Arthur, of Welsh parentage and crowned at Caerleon, referred to by early writers such as Nennius, Geoffrey of Monmouth and many others, but considered by more modern historians as a combination of "monkish legends and chivalrous fiction"
c. 500–589		The time of Dewi ap Sanctus (grandson of Ceredig, founder of Ceredigion), who later became Saint David, patron saint of Wales
519		Bishop Dubricius presides over the Synod of Llanddewi Brefi, during which he resigns and recommends that Bishop Dewi succeed him; this is approved
c. 522		Dewi moves the seat of the primacy to Mynyw, where the see became known as St David's, but the settlement was called Menevia at least until the 13th century, and later became the city of St David's
547		Death of Maelgwn Gwynedd, king of Gwynedd, known for funding the foundation of Christian churches throughout Wales; Maelgwn may have died of the bubonic plague, a pandemic that spread across Europe and beyond in the early 540s, mostly via trade routes
c.560		Death of Bishop Dewi. His episcopal see at Menevia is renamed Ty Ddewi (The House of David) in his honour

== 7th century ==
Year	Date	Event
c. 600		The terms Cymry (Welsh people) and Cymru (Wales), as opposed to other Celtic peoples and regions, already in use as self-identifiers
615/616		Battle of Chester between Anglo-Saxons and native Britons
630		Welsh/Mercian alliance between King Cadwallon of Gwynedd and Penda of Mercia defeats army of King Edwin of Northumbria at the Battle of Cefn Digoll (or "Battle of the Long Mynd") at Long Mountain near Welshpool
633/4		Cadwallon ap Cadfan, king of Gwynedd, dies in battle in the north of England
c. 655–682		Reign of Cadwaladr ap Cadwallon, king of Gwynedd.

== 8th century ==
Year	Date	Event
700–750		At the height of its powers, Mercia expands westwards to the Dee, Wye, and Severn rivers, at the expense of the Welsh kingdom of Powys; forced back into the upland regions, the Welsh launch a series of raids throughout the late 7th and early 8th centuries, in a bid to regain the rich farming territory of the lowlands.
c. 753		An invading army from Wessex is beaten back by the Welsh at Hereford
c. 754		Death of king Rhodri Molwynog, whose lineage is unclear, and whose predecessor and date of succession are not known; the reign of king Rhodri's successor, Cynan (probably Rhodri's son), was one of incessant warfare; Rhodri may have been succeeded by Caradog ap Meirion, or Caradog may have been a district ruler
c. 755–794		Offa of Mercia and Cynewulf of Wessex campaign vigorously along the length of the border with the Welsh kingdoms, causing the Welsh to lose lands they would never recover and largely establishing the eastern borders of Wales that exist today; internal Welsh strife continues
c. 757–796		Offa's Dyke is built along the Wales–England border to mark the boundary between Anglian Mercia and the Welsh kingdom of Powys; however, radiocarbon dating of samples taken from excavations in 2014 reveal that it may have been constructed much earlier than this, and over an extended time period
768		The Welsh church adopts the Catholic method of calculating Easter through the efforts of bishop Elfodd
795/6		Battle at Rhuddlan Marsh, between the Saxons and Welsh; there is confusion between possible battles at Rhuddlan Marsh (Denbighshire) in 795 and Rhuddlan (Flintshire) in 796
c. 798		When Caradog of Gwynedd and Meredydd of Dyfed die at the hands of the Mercians, Cynan ap Rhodri becomes the next king of Gwynedd

== 9th century ==
Year	Date	Event
825		Egbert of Wessex defeats the Mercians and demands sovereignty over Wales
c. 828		Nennius, a 9th-century Welsh monk, is thought to have written Historia Brittonum, a history of the Celtic Britons, although some experts argue that the work was written anonymously
844		Rhodri ap Merfyn (later known as Rhodri the Great) becomes king of Gwynedd, Powys and Deheubarth by right of succession, uniting the three kingdoms under one rule
c. 878		When Rhodri the Great dies fighting the Saxons on Anglesey, his three eldest sons become regional rulers: Cadell in Seisyllwg (mainly Ceredigion), Anarawd in Gwynedd and Merfyn in Powys.
c. 885		Several Welsh kings submit to Alfred the Great's lordship; Asser, a Welsh cleric, is invited to join Alfred in Wessex; in 893, Asser writes a biography of Alfred
893	(spring)	The Battle of Buttington ends in victory for a combined Anglo-Saxon and Welsh force against the Danish Vikings; the Buttington Oak, believed to have been planted around this time to commemorate the battle, survives until February 2018
893	(autumn)	Danish Vikings occupy the town of Chester, but when Alfred the Great cuts off their food supplies, they move west and carry out raids in north Wales before returning to Essex

== 10th century ==
Year	Date	Event
904		Merfyn ap Rhodri was slain by Vikings. Hywel ap Cadell (grandson of Rhodri the Great) marries Elen, daughter of Llywarch ap Hyfaidd, the late king of Dyfed, thus inheriting the kingdom
910		Death of Cadell ap Rhodri, king of Seisyllwg.
916		Death of Anarawd ap Rhodri, king of Gwynedd.
920		Hywel ap Cadell unites the kingdoms of Dyfed and Seisyllwg, to create the new realm of Deheubarth ("southern district")
c. 926		Hywel convenes a council from all parts of Wales to establish a set of Laws for the whole country; he takes the transcript to Rome and obtains the Pope's approval
928		King Æthelstan of England asserts authority over the Welsh kings, and fixes the border between England and Wales at the River Wye; this may have been the first time a border dispute (involving the Welsh in the Witangemot) was settled by discussion, rather than by war
943		Hywel ap Cadell (known by this time as Hywel Dda or "Hywel the Good") assumes control of Gwynedd after a joint Danish and Saxon incursion leads to the death of their king and his brother; Hywel eventually extends his rule to most of Wales
949 or 950		Death of king Hywel Dda. After his death, Gwynedd gained independence. Hywel Dda's nephews, Iago ab Idwal and Ieuaf ab Idwal, reclaim the kingdom of Gwynedd by driving out their cousins at the Battle of Carno.
952–954		Territorial struggles continue between the sons and nephews of Hywel Dda, ending in defeat for the southern princes at a major battle near Llanrwst
969		Iago ab Idwal imprisons his brother Ieuaf, then continues to rule Gwynedd unimpeded for the next decade
972		King Edgar of England comes to Chester in person to broker peace between the regional kings, but the conflicts resume after his departure
979		Iago ab Idwal is defeated in battle by his nephew Hywel ap Ieuaf, who becomes the next king of Gwynedd
985		After the death of Hywel ap Ieuaf, his brother Cadwallon ab Ieuaf takes on the rule of Gwynedd for a brief period
986		Maredudd ab Owain captures the kingdom of Gwynedd, which is later annexed with Deheubarth; Danes invade in the south
987		After carrying out several major raids on Wales in previous years, Norse king Godfrey Haroldson takes two thousand captives from Anglesey for ransom
996		Vikings sack St David's in Pembrokeshire, and murder the bishop, Morgeneu
999		Cynan ap Hywel becomes king of Gwynedd

== 11th century ==
Year	Date	Event
c. 1000		Aeddan ap Blegywryd subjugates north Wales; the hereditary heir, Iago, flees to Ireland; Cynan ap Hywel, though supported by Irish Danes, fails to recover his possessions
1005		On the death of Cynan, the pretender Aeddan is ruler of Gwynedd
1018		Llywelyn ap Seisyll, with distant claims to Gwynedd and Deheubarth, defeats Aeddan (who is killed along with his four sons) and takes control of the kingdoms of Gwynedd and Powys
1022		Llywelyn ap Seisyll defeats the pretender Rhain ("the Irishman"), who claimed to be a son of Maredudd ab Owain, at Abergwili and takes control of the south
1023		On the death of Llywelyn ap Seisyll, the rule of Gwynedd and Powys passes to Iago ab Idwal ap Meurig who is descended from the ancient dynasty
1039		Iago ab Idwal ap Meurig is killed by his own men, and replaced as ruler of Gwynedd and Powys by Gruffydd ap Llywelyn (King Llywelyn ap Seisyll's son, and great-great-grandson of Hywel Dda)
1055	24 October	Gruffydd ap Llywelyn sacks Hereford, one of several territories that he is able to seize in Wales and along the border with England
1056	16 June	Gruffydd ap Llywelyn defeats an English army at the Battle of Glasbury (Claftbyrig), near Hereford; around this time, he begins to be recognised as the true King of Wales
1062–1063		English nobleman Harold Godwinson (who will later become the last Anglo-Saxon king of England) leads a series of campaigns against Gruffydd ap Llywelyn
1063	5 August	Death of Gruffydd ap Llywelyn, after which the Welsh kingdoms are ruled separately for a brief period prior to the Norman invasion of Wales; Bleddyn ap Cynfyn becomes king of Gwynedd
1067		Gwent is invaded by William FitzOsbern, 1st Earl of Hereford and his followers, and becomes the first of the Welsh kingdoms to be overrun following the Norman conquest of England the previous year
1070		Bleddyn ap Cynfyn becomes king of both Gwynedd and Powys after the Battle of Mechain
1075		Death of Bleddyn ap Cynfyn leads to a civil war in which the Normans take the opportunity to seize lands in northern Wales
1081		Gruffudd ap Cynan becomes king of Gwynedd following the Battle of Mynydd Carn, but is captured and imprisoned by Norman invaders soon afterwards; William the Conqueror leads a Norman army into Deheubarth, and worships at the shrine of St David
1088–1092		Lordships of Welsh lands apportioned to Normans and their Welsh allies; Normans accelerate building or strengthening castles across the country
1094–1098		Welsh revolt against Norman rule leads to territories being regained by the Britons; William II of England attempts to suppress the revolt in north Wales with little success
1098	June/July	Shortly after capturing Anglesey from the Welsh, the Normans are defeated at the Battle of Anglesey Sound and forced to retreat, paving the way for the return of the exiled Gruffudd ap Cynan
1099		Gruffudd ap Cynan escapes from imprisonment again and rules Anglesey with the consent of the Normans

== 12th century ==
Year	Date	Event
1100		With the death of William II, much of Wales is under Welsh rule but, with constant struggles for local control, there is no cohesive national identity
1102–1113		Period of violent power struggles for regional control between the English crown, under the new King Henry I, and Welsh leaders such as Iorwerth ap Bleddyn, Prince of Powys, and his brothers Cadwgan and Maredudd
c. 1106		Construction begins on Ogmore Castle in Glamorgan, one of the earliest Norman stone castles in South Wales
1111–1114		Normans move into south and north Wales; peace is agreed between King Henry I and Gruffudd ap Cynan of Gwynedd; Owain ap Cadwgan is knighted by King Henry I for his service in Normandy
1115–1130		A period of inter-family differences and rights of succession, mainly in the south and east (but to some extent in Gwynedd), are marked by warfare and brutality; Owain ap Cadwgan is killed in battle and most of Powys passes to his uncle, Maredudd ap Bleddyn
c. 1123		Saint David is canonised by the Holy See
1131	9 May	Tintern Abbey, the first Cistercian monastery in Wales, is founded in Monmouthshire
1132	9 February	Death of Maredudd ap Bleddyn; he is succeeded as ruler of Powys by his son Madog ap Maredudd
1136	1 January	The Welsh revolt against Norman occupation continues with a defeat of Norman forces at the Battle of Llwchwr (Battle of Gower)
1136	September/ October	Owain ap Gruffudd, allied with Gruffydd ap Rhys of Deheubarth, inflicts a crushing defeat on the Normans at the Battle of Crug Mawr and annexes Ceredigion
1137	11 April	Death of Gruffudd ap Cynan; he is succeeded as king of Gwynedd by his son Owain ap Gruffudd (who later becomes known as Owain Gwynedd)
1157	July	Owain Gwynedd, with an army of around 3,000, forces the retreat of Henry II's much larger army (supported by Madog of Powys, who has yielded to Henry the previous year) at the Battle of Ewloe in Flintshire; following the campaign, Owain yields to Henry, but retains his rule and territory
1160		Following the death of Madog ap Maredudd, the kingdom of Powys is split into two parts: Maelor, the northern portion, is later renamed Powys Fadog; and Cyfeiliog, in the south, becomes Powys Wenwynwyn
1165	August	Henry II's efforts to subdue north Wales continue with the inconclusive Battle of Crogen in the Ceiriog Valley
1170		Death of Owain Gwynedd throws the kingdom of Gwynedd into disarray; within weeks, his nominated heir Hywel is dead, and his illegitimate son Dafydd usurps the rule of Gwynedd, but he fails to maintain his father's hold on south Wales, which falls into the hands of Rhys ap Gruffydd
1171		Henry II leads a large army into south Wales, meets amicably with Rhys ap Gruffydd, and after making an offering at St David's shrine, he sails from Pembroke with his army for Ireland
1172		Rhys ap Gruffydd is appointed justice of south Wales by Henry II, essentially becoming ruler in Henry's stead
1176	December	To celebrate his primacy, Rhys ap Gruffydd hosts a gathering of bards, musicians and performers at Cardigan Castle, which is now regarded as the first recorded eisteddfod
1188		Gerald of Wales accompanies the Archbishop of Canterbury on a journey through Wales to recruit volunteers for the Third Crusade, recorded in his Itinerarium Kambriae. Owain Cyfeiliog, Prince of Powys Wenwynwyn refuses to support the visit and is consequently excommunicated
1191		Gerald of Wales writes Itinerarium Cambriae, an account of his tour of Wales with the Archbishop of Canterbury three years earlier
1194		Llywelyn ap Iorwerth (who later becomes known as Llywelyn the Great) defeats his uncle Dafydd ab Owain Gwynedd at the Battle of Aberconwy and seizes control of Gwynedd
1194		Gerald of Wales writes Descriptio Cambriae; he writes of Wales as a nation, with defined borders, and a common ancestry and identity who "if they would be inseparable, they would be insuperable"

== 13th century ==
Year	Date	Event
1200		By this date, the title of regional rulers as "king" has given way to the title "prince"
1201	July	Llywelyn the Great, Prince of Gwynedd, signs a treaty with King John of England and they remain on good terms for the next ten years
1204		After five years of lobbying, including directly to the Pope, Gerald of Wales fails to have St David's raised to an archbishopric
1205		Llywelyn the Great consolidates his position by marrying King John's illegitimate daughter Joan
1211	August	Suspicious of Llywelyn's expansion of Gwynedd into neighbouring territories, King John invades Gwynedd, assisted by most of the other Welsh princes, forcing Llywelyn to seek terms with John and accept abandonment by his allies
1212		John's clear intent of intrusive overlordship of Wales leads to Welsh leaders rallying to Llywelyn the Great, who recaptures all of Gwynedd; King John plans another invasion but this attempt is abandoned
1215	May	Llywelyn, in support of the disaffected English barons, seizes Shrewsbury, a factor in King John's submission to the barons
1215	15 June	When King John is forced to sign Magna Carta, Llywelyn the Great is rewarded with several favourable provisions relating to Wales, in particular the rights to its own laws
1218		After three more years of conflict within Wales, Llywelyn overcomes all opposition and receives the homage of all the other Welsh rulers, and his pre-eminence is confirmed by the English crown in the Treaty of Worcester
1234	21 June	The "Peace of Middle" establishes a truce between Llywelyn the Great and the English Crown; Llywelyn styles himself "Prince of Aberffraw" and "Lord of Snowdonia"
1240	11 April	Death of Llywelyn the Great; Dafydd ap Llywelyn succeeds his father as Prince of Gwynedd, but King Henry III does not support his overlordship as prince of all Wales, thus deliberately undermining Welsh unity
1244		King Henry III of England attacks Gwynedd; Dafydd styles himself prince of Wales; he offers Wales as a vassal state to the Pope, to free Wales from English dominion, but this is denied
1246	25 February	Dafydd ap Llywelyn dies without issue; his nephew Llywelyn ap Gruffudd (grandson of Llywelyn the Great) eventually succeeds as Prince of Gwynedd
1247		After three years of devastating war, Wales is reduced again to lordships under English rule by the Treaty of Woodstock
1258		Llywelyn ap Gruffudd begins to use the title of "Prince of Wales"
1267	29 September	King Henry III accepts Llywelyn ap Gruffudd as Prince of Wales under the terms of the Treaty of Montgomery
1282	11 December	Death of Llywelyn ap Gruffudd at the Battle of Orewin Bridge; his brother Dafydd ap Gruffydd succeeds, styling himself Prince of Wales
1283	22 June	Dafydd ap Gruffudd is captured by King Edward I of England and charged with high treason
1283	3 October	Dafydd ap Gruffudd is executed at Shrewsbury
1284	3 March	King Edward I enacts the Statute of Rhuddlan, which provides the constitutional basis for the government of the Principality of North Wales
1294–1295		Madog ap Llywelyn leads a Welsh revolt against English rule, claiming the title of "Prince of Wales"
1295		Madog is defeated at the Battle of Maes Moydog; he escapes, but subsequently surrenders unconditionally and is taken to London, but his fate is unknown.

== 14th century ==
Year	Date	Event
1301	7 February	Edward of Carnarvon is invested as the first English Prince of Wales (as the title is transferred to the heir apparent to the English or British throne)
1306		Work resumes on Beaumaris Castle prompted by fears of a Scottish invasion of North Wales
1316	28 January	Llywelyn Bren launches a surprise attack on Caerphilly Castle in a revolt against English rule in Wales; he lays siege to the castle for six weeks and surrenders unconditionally to King Edward II's forces on 18 March
1318		Llywelyn Bren is unlawfully executed at Cardiff Castle
1321	May	Newport, Cardiff and Caerphilly are seized by the Marcher Lord Roger Mortimer in an intense eight-day campaign in the Despenser War against King Edward II of England
1326		King Edward II retreats to Wales with his forces after his regime collapses; he is captured by rebel forces north of Caerphilly, escorted back to England via Monmouth Castle and relinquishes his crown two months later
1330		The construction of Beaumaris Castle is halted and, despite a huge sum of money being spent on it (£15,000) the building is never completed
1339		Farndon Bridge is built across the River Dee and the Wales–England border
1345		The first stone bridge at Llangollen is built across the River Dee by John Trevor
1369		Owain Lawgoch launches an unsuccessful invasion attempt on Wales in a bid to take back his confiscated lands
1372	May	In Paris, Owain Lawgoch announces his intention of claiming the throne of Wales, and then mobilises his forces in readiness for another invasion attempt
1384		Owain Glyndŵr enters the army of King Richard II of England
1399	July–September	King Richard II seeks refuge at Conwy Castle and surrenders to Henry Bolingbroke at Flint Castle

== 15th century ==
Year	Date	Event
1401	March	Conwy Castle is taken by Owain Glyndŵr's supporters and is held for several months.
1401	June	The Battle of Mynydd Hyddgen, part of the Glyndŵr Rising against English rule, is the first major victory for Glyndŵr's Welsh rebels.
1401	2 November	At the Battle of Tuthill at Caernarfon, Owain Glyndŵr first raises the royal standard bearing a golden dragon on a white field.
1402	22 June	The Battle of Bryn Glas (also known as the Battle of Pilleth) ends in victory for Owain Glyndŵr, prolonging the Welsh rebellion against English rule.
1402	August	Owain Glyndŵr receives a warm welcome in southeast Wales.
1403	July	Owain Glyndŵr attacks, but fails to take, Carreg Cennen Castle.
1403	21 July	The Battle of Shrewsbury ends in defeat and the death of Henry Percy, an ally of Owain Glyndŵr, ending the Percy challenge to King Henry IV of England.
1403	Autumn	The reputed Battle of Stalling Down near Cowbridge ends in defeat for the King's army.
1404	May	Owain Glyndŵr writes to the King of France requesting military support.
1404	July	Owain Glyndŵr holds a Welsh Parliament in Machynlleth, where he is crowned Prince of Wales in the presence of envoys from France, Scotland and Castile.
1405	28 February	Peak of the Glyndŵr Rising: Tripartite Indenture is agreed between Owain Glyndŵr, Henry Percy and Edmund Mortimer, to divide Wales and England between them, at the expense of King Henry IV.
1405	5 May	The Battle of Pwll Melyn is the first major defeat for Owain Glyndŵr.
1405	August	French forces land at Milford Haven; Owain Glyndŵr holds his second Welsh Parliament, at Harlech Castle.
1405	November	Owain Glyndŵr's forces and French forces reach Worcester, but not seeing English support, the French abandon the campaign and return to France.
1406	31 March	Owain Glyndŵr writes the "Pennal Letter" to King Charles VI of France, outlining his vision for the future government of an independent Wales.
1408	September	Aberystwyth Castle surrenders to the English, and Owain Glyndŵr moves his court to Harlech.
1409		Harlech Castle is captured by English forces; Glyndŵr and his supporters flee to the mountains, from where they continue sporadic attacks for several years; Glyndŵr's wife Margaret Hanmer is taken prisoner, along with her children and grandchildren, most of whom probably die later in captivity (Hanmer herself dies c. 1420).
1413		Nothing is heard of Owain Glyndŵr after this date.
1415	21 September	End of the Glyndŵr Rising; approximate date of Owain Glyndŵr's death, possibly in Herefordshire
1415	25 October	Welsh archers play a key part in the victory of King Henry V of England over a much larger French army at the Battle of Agincourt; some Welsh combatants fight on the French side.
1417	30 April	Owain Glyndŵr's son, Maredudd ab Owain Glyndŵr, declines the offer of a pardon from King Henry V for both himself and his father.
1421		Maredudd ab Owain Glyndŵr finally accepts a pardon (for himself alone) from King Henry V.
1437		Work begins on the construction of the (present) Raglan Castle, replacing an earlier structure.
c. 1451		The first large-scale eisteddfod is held at Carmarthen: Dafydd ab Edmwnd wins the silver chair for his poetry.
1460	10 July	Following defeat at the Battle of Northampton, the Queen of England, Margaret of Anjou, escapes to Harlech Castle with her son Edward, Prince of Wales.
1468	14 August	The garrison of Harlech Castle surrenders to King Edward IV after a seven-year siege.
1471	4 May	The Battle of Tewkesbury ends Lancastrian hopes of regaining the ascendance over the House of York in the Wars of the Roses; King Edward IV is victorious, and Edward of Westminster becomes the only Prince of Wales ever to die in battle.
1473		The Court of the President and Council of Wales is established at Ludlow Castle.
1483	14 April	Whilst residing at Ludlow Castle, 12-year-old King Edward V of England receives news of his father's sudden death and his own accession to the English throne; the Council at Ludlow comes to an end.
1485	1 August	Henry Tudor lands near Dale, Pembrokeshire, and marches through Wales (8 to 14 August) and England where, on 22 August, he defeats King Richard III at the Battle of Bosworth Field to become the third and last Welsh-born King of England.
1488		King Henry VII's uncle, Jasper Tudor, takes possession of Cardiff Castle.
1490	27 February	English-born Arthur Tudor, the eldest son of King Henry VII, is ceremonially invested as Prince of Wales at the Palace of Westminster.
1498		An insurrection breaks out in Meirionydd in north Wales and the rebels capture Harlech Castle; the revolt is the last of the medieval era in Wales.

== 16th century ==
Year	Date	Event
1523		Caerwys hosts an eisteddfod, one of the most important of the early modern era, attended by Welsh poet Tudur Aled
1535–1542		Laws in Wales Acts replace Welsh law with English law and replace the Marcher Lordships with newly established counties; Wales is unified with England
1536		Dissolution of the monasteries: a great number of abbeys and priories in Wales are suppressed over the next four years, including Monmouth Priory, Neath Abbey, and Tintern Abbey
1546		Yny lhyvyr hwnn, the first book to be printed in the Welsh language (said to be written anonymously by Sir John Prise), is published in London
1563		The Usk Bridge is built to replace the medieval bridge that was washed away in floods in 1535; this is Brecon's oldest route over the River Usk
1567		Caerwys hosts its second large-scale eisteddfod, sanctioned by Queen Elizabeth I of England
1573		The earliest map showing Wales as a separate country from the rest of Great Britain, Cambriae Typus by Humphrey Llwyd, is published in the first modern atlas Theatrum Orbis Terrarum
1584		The first Welsh copper smelting works is established at Aberdulais
1588		The first translation of the Bible into Welsh, Y Beibl cyssegr-lan by bishop William Morgan, is published

== 17th century ==
Year	Date	Event
1601		Poor Relief Act 1601 is passed to create a poor law system in England and Wales
1606	12 April	A new national flag is created by royal decree to mark the union between England and Scotland; Wales is not represented in the design because it is legally a part of England
1607	30 January	Bristol Channel floods cause devastation on the south coast of Wales, affecting Pembrokeshire, Glamorgan, and Monmouthshire; Cardiff is the worst affected town, with the foundations of St Mary's Church destroyed
1615–1617		The Wye Bridge in Monmouth is rebuilt in stone
1620		Bishop William Morgan's Bible translation into Welsh (first published in 1588) is revised by Bishop Richard Parry and Dr John Davies as Y Bibl Cyssegr-lan, and published in London
1636		The three-arch stone bridge, Pont Fawr, at Llanrwst is built for Sir Richard Wynn of Gwydir Castle; nicknamed locally as "Pont Inigo Jones", its design is attributed to classical architect Inigo Jones
1640		Cannon production begins at Bersham Ironworks
1642/43		Skirmishes between Parliamentarians and Royalists bring the English Civil War to (largely Royalist or neutral) Wales, including naval action at Milford Haven
1643	November	Parliamentary forces make piecemeal strategic gains in Wales from the north and south
1644	April	Further advances by Parliamentary forces in southwest Wales, threatening Cardiganshire and Carmarthenshire
1644	July	Widespread military actions across the whole of south Wales, resulting in gains for the Parliamentarians
1644	17 September	The first battle of the English Civil War on Welsh soil takes place at Montgomery and the castle is taken by the Parliamentarians
1644/45		Cardigan Castle is besieged and captured by Parliamentarians, before being attacked by Royalists who leave the castle slighted and burned
1645	June–September	King Charles I of England tours south and mid-Wales to rally support in the wake of his defeat at the Battle of Naseby
1646	February	Cardiff Castle is besieged by Royalists, but relieved by Parliamentarians
1646	April–June	Aberystwyth Castle, after a long siege, surrenders to Parliamentary forces; most castles in north Wales are under siege; Caernarvon, Anglesey and Beaumaris submit to Parliament
1646	19 August	Raglan Castle surrenders to Parliamentary forces
1646	October	Denbigh Castle surrenders to Parliamentary forces
1647	19 January	Holt Castle surrenders to Parliamentary forces after a siege lasting several months
1647	16 March	Harlech Castle surrenders to Parliamentary forces; it is the last Royalist stronghold of the English Civil War in mainland Britain
1648	8 May	The Battle of St. Fagans takes place near Cardiff, a pitched battle (termed by some an insurrection) between Parliamentarians and Royalists (more accurately disaffected Parliamentary forces), part of the Second English Civil War, in which there is fighting throughout south Wales
1648	June	Fighting breaks out in north Wales; the insurrection is suppressed
1648	July	After a long siege, Pembroke surrenders to Parliament
1648	July–October	Anglesey is the last area in Wales to submit to the rule of Parliament, which demands the sum of £7,000 for military expenditure; end of the English Civil War in Wales
1649	January	Welsh politicians, Thomas Wogan (Pembroke) and John Jones Maesygarnedd (Merioneth), are among the signatories to the death warrant of Charles I; after the restoration, Wogan flees the country and Jones is executed
1649		Aberystwyth Castle is slighted by Commonwealth troops
1649	June	Montgomery Castle is demolished by order of the Rump Parliament
1650	22 February	The Act for the better propagation and preaching of the Gospel in Wales is passed by Parliament, resulting in the ejection of dissident clergymen and the creation of English-language schools
1655		Conwy Castle is slighted by order of the English Council of State following the British Civil Wars
1659	5 August	Booth's Rebellion proclaims Charles II as King of England; its leaders include Thomas Myddelton, a former Parliamentary general, of Chirk Castle near Wrexham
1659		Denbigh Castle is slighted after being seized by Royalist soldiers
1682	30 August	A group of Welsh settlers, including Thomas Wynne, set sail for Pennsylvania
1686		Welsh Quaker leader Rowland Ellis, and his fellow Quakers, leave Wales for Pennsylvania to avoid religious persecution
1688		Abergavenny's Royal charter is annulled when the chief officers of the town's corporation refuse to take the oath of allegiance to King William III of England, leading to a subsequent decline in the town's prosperity
1694		The first of two copper mills opens in the Neath Valley, powered by waterfalls on the River Neath. Copper smelting, refining and working becomes a prime commercial concern in Wales in the late 17th century.

== 18th century ==
Year	Date	Event
1717	4 November	Skerries Lighthouse begins operation, guiding ships past the low tract of submerged land off Carmel Head, northwest Anglesey
1723		The Workhouse Test Act (also known as Knatchbull's Act) is passed by UK government, leading to the establishment of numerous workhouses in England and Wales over the next two decades
1746		The Wales and Berwick Act is passed, creating a statutory definition of "England" as including England, Wales and Berwick-upon-Tweed
1761		Bersham Ironworks employs a new boring machine for the accurate production of smooth bore cannon, later supplying cannon for use in the American War of Independence and the Napoleonic wars
1765		Opening of the Cyfarthfa Ironworks and construction of the first coke blast furnace for the production of pig iron
1768		A rich seam of copper ore is discovered at Parys Mountain, Anglesey, leading to the formation of the Parys Mine Company, soon to become the world's most productive copper mining concern. Wales dominates the world copper markets throughout this period.
1782		The Relief of the Poor Act (also known as Gilbert's Act) is passed by UK government, enabling poor relief to be provided at home for the able-bodied poor (later repealed in 1871 by the Statute Law Revision Act)
1793		Pont-y-Cafnau, the world's earliest surviving iron railway bridge, is constructed to support a tramway and aqueduct for the transport of raw materials to the Cyfarthfa Ironworks
1797	22–24 February	The Pembrokeshire coast is invaded by Republican France in the Battle of Fishguard, often referred to as the "last invasion of Britain" as it represents the last assault launched on British soil by a hostile foreign power

== 19th century ==
Year	Date	Event
1802		Admiral Nelson pays a personal visit to the Cyfarthfa Ironworks in Merthyr Tydfil
1804	21 February	The world's first ever railway journey takes place when Richard Trevithick's steam locomotive runs along the newly laid tramroad from Penydarren Ironworks to the canal wharf at Abercynon
1810/11		William Madocks builds a sea wall to reclaim a large proportion of Traeth Mawr from the sea for agricultural use, the origins of the town of Porthmadog
1819		The first "provincial" eisteddfod is held in Carmarthen, marking the revival of the traditional arts festival as a Welsh institution
1823	18 January	The Red Lady of Paviland, a partial skeleton from the Stone Age, is discovered by William Buckland in a limestone cave on the Gower Peninsula; considered to be the oldest known ceremonial burial in Western Europe
1830		Merthyr Tydfil is by now the largest town in Wales, mainly populated by workers in the iron and coal industries, and their families
1831	June	An armed uprising takes place in Merthyr Tydfil, as thousands of workers protest against their poor wages and working conditions
1831	13 August	Despite a petition for his release, a young miner called Richard Lewis (also known as Dic Penderyn) is hanged outside Cardiff Gaol for stabbing a soldier with a bayonet during the Merthyr Rising; later proven to be innocent, he is remembered as a working-class martyr
1833		Samuel Lewis publishes the comprehensive, two-volume, historical and geographical A Topographical Dictionary of Wales (the 4th edition, 1849, is online)
1834	14 August	Poor Law Amendment Act 1834 is passed by UK government, replacing earlier poor relief legislation and fundamentally reforming the poverty relief system in England and Wales (later repealed in 1948 at the rise of the British welfare state)
1835		The Swansea Philosophical & Literary Society is established with the purpose of making Swansea a centre of culture and scientific research
1837		Opening of Port Talbot Docks, the first major docks in South Wales, which are named after Christopher Rice Mansel Talbot (MP for Glamorganshire), the main sponsor of the project
1838		The Swansea Philosophical & Literary Society is granted a royal charter in recognition of the high quality of scientific research by its members; the society is renamed the Royal Institution of South Wales
1839	4 November	Newport Rising, an armed rebellion by the Chartism movement against authority, led by Chartist John Frost
1840	16 January	Chartists John Frost, Zephaniah Williams and William Jones are found guilty of high treason for their part in the 1839 Newport Rising, and sentenced to death (later commuted to penal transportation)
1840	5 June	Joseph Brown is appointed Vicar Apostolic of the Roman Catholic District of Wales
1840	8 October	Official opening of Taff Vale Railway, the first steam-worked passenger railway in Wales
1840	28 October	Joseph Brown, Vicar Apostolic of the Roman Catholic District of Wales, is consecrated as a bishop
1841	19 February	The Governor Fenner, carrying emigrants to America, collides with a steamer off Holyhead and sinks with the loss of 123 lives
1841	9 March	The earliest recorded photograph in Wales, a daguerreotype of Margam Castle, is taken by Calvert Jones
1841	April	The population of Wales exceeds one million
1841	21 April	The Taff Vale Railway is extended from Abercynon to Merthyr Tydfil
1841		Opening of Swansea Museum—the oldest museum in Wales—by the Royal Institution of South Wales
1842	12 April	Morgan Williams travels to the Chartist Convention in London, to present to parliament a petition signed by 36,000 people from south Wales
1842	May	The Royal Children's Employment Commission publishes its first report on the employment of children in the British coal industry, which reveals that children as young as five are working long shifts underground
1842	June	The Rebecca Riots begin in earnest in south and west Wales, as local farmers and agricultural workers launch a series of attacks on tollhouses and other symbols of economic oppression
1842	10 October	Official opening of the Town Dock (later known as the "Old Dock"), the first floating dock facility in Newport harbour, able to accommodate the largest ships in the world
1850		National Roman Legion Museum is established in Caerleon, near Newport
1851		A bronze statue of the British military leader Sir William Nott is erected in his home town of Carmarthen
1860	1 December	A major explosion at the Black Vein Colliery in Risca, southeast Wales, claims 142 lives
1861		The first official National Eisteddfod, as we know it today, takes place in Aberdare
1865	28 July	153 Welsh settlers establish Y Wladfa in Patagonia, Argentina
1867	8 November	Two explosions at the Ferndale Colliery in the Rhondda Valley claim the lives of 178 men and boys
1875	16 April	Official opening of the Alexandra Dock in Newport, following the success of the Town Dock and the subsequent increase in the volume of trade
1875		Cyfarthfa Ironworks is forced to close after more than 100 years of production
1878	11 September	A catastrophic explosion at the Prince of Wales Colliery in Abercarn claims the lives of 268 men and boys
1880	15 July	A major explosion at the New Risca Colliery in Risca, southeast Wales, claims 120 lives
1883		Cardiff hosts the National Eisteddfod for the first time since its modern inception in 1861
1887		The National Eisteddfod is held in London's Royal Albert Hall for the first time
1888		The small village of Llanwddyn, at the head of the Vyrnwy valley, is flooded to create the Lake Vyrnwy reservoir for supplying fresh water to Liverpool and Merseyside
1890	6 February	An explosion at the Llanerch Colliery in Abersychan claims the lives of 176 men and boys
1890	10 April	David Lloyd George returned as Liberal MP for Carnarvon Boroughs
1893	6 June	The second of the Alexandra Docks, the South Dock, opens at Newport (and the original Alexandra Dock is renamed the "North Dock")
1893		Construction work begins on the dams for the Elan Valley Reservoirs, which will supply clean drinking water to Birmingham in the English West Midlands
1894	23 June	An explosion at the Albion Colliery in Cilfynydd claims the lives of 290 men and boys; one of the worst mining accidents ever to occur in the United Kingdom, it is the second worst mining disaster in Welsh history (after the Senghenydd colliery disaster in 1913)

== 20th century ==
Year	Date	Event
1900–1920		Peak of the coal mining industry in Wales, with more than 600 collieries employing over 230,000 men
1901		The population of Wales exceeds two million, having doubled in 60 years.
1904	21 July	Official opening of the Elan Valley Reservoirs by King Edward VII of England and Queen Alexandra; water starts flowing along 118 km of gravity-driven pipeline to the Frankley Reservoir in Birmingham.
1905		Construction of the original steel mill at Port Talbot is completed.
1905	28 October	Cardiff is granted city status by King Edward VII.
1906	27 June	An earthquake strikes near Swansea, causing some minor structural damage to buildings; measuring 5.2 on the Richter scale, it is one of the most significant earthquakes to occur in the UK in the 20th century.
1907	19 March	National Museum of Wales and the National Library of Wales is established in Cardiff and Aberystwyth respectively, by a royal charter.
1908	10 August	Royal Commission on the Ancient and Historical Monuments of Wales (RCAHMW) is established.
1911	13 July	Prince Edward is invested as the Prince of Wales in an elaborate ceremony at Caernarfon Castle.
1911	16 December	The 1911 Coal Mines Act is passed, following a series of mine disasters in the 19th and early-20th centuries, including several in Wales; the Act amends existing laws covering safety and other aspects of the UK coal mining industry.
1911–1913		A significant prehistoric metalwork hoard, thought to have been deposited in a sacred ritual, is discovered at Llyn Fawr when the lake is partially drained for the construction of a new reservoir.
1913	14 October	A huge explosion at the Universal Colliery in Senghenydd claims the lives of 439 men and boys; it is the worst mining disaster in the history of the British coalfields.
1914	18 September	The long-awaited Welsh Church Act receives royal assent, but will not come into force until after the First World War.
1916	6 December	David Lloyd George becomes Prime Minister of the United Kingdom; although not actually Welsh-born, Lloyd George grew up in Wales and he was the first Welsh-speaking British prime minister.
1919		Final closure of the Cyfarthfa Ironworks, which is dismantled nine years later.
1920	31 March	The Welsh Church Act 1914 takes effect, allowing the creation of the Church in Wales which encompasses most of the Welsh part of the Church of England. The Act disestablishes the Church in Wales and establishes the Archbishopric of Wales; the first Archbishop is Alfred George Edwards.
1924	25 September	Malcolm Campbell sets a world land speed record of 146.16 mph (235.22 km/h) on Pendine Sands, Carmarthen Bay, in his Sunbeam 350HP car Blue Bird, the first of several successful record attempts on the Sands in the 1920s.
1925	5 August	The Welsh social-democratic political party Plaid Genedlaethol Cymru (meaning "The National Party of Wales") is formed in Pwllheli, later changing its name to Plaid Cymru (or simply "The Party of Wales").
1929	May	The first Urdd National Eisteddfod, a competitive youth festival of literature, music and performing arts, is held in Corwen, Denbighshire.
1930	October	Closure of Newport's "Old Dock", as resources are concentrated on the modern Alexandra Dock complex
1934	22 September	A major explosion at the Gresford Colliery near Wrexham claims the lives of 266 men.
1935		Production of Y Chwarelwr (The Quarryman), the first audio feature film recorded in the Welsh language
1936	8 September	Arson attack at RAF Penrhos "bombing school" by three members of Plaid Genedlaethol Cymru, known as the Tân yn Llŷn (Fire in Llŷn) protest; the culmination of an ongoing opposition campaign, it is considered to be a defining moment in the history of the political party.
1936/7		Welsh archaeologist W. F. Grimes excavates the tomb of Pentre Ifan in Pembrokeshire.
1942/3		Over 150 Iron Age metal objects are discovered in Llyn Cerrig Bach on Anglesey, evidently placed in the lake as votive offerings.
1947	1 January	The British coal industry is nationalised as a result of the Coal Industry Nationalisation Act 1946; the move fails to halt the decline in the Welsh coal mining industry and the repeated closure of Welsh collieries.
1947	June	The first International Musical Eisteddfod is held in Llangollen.
1948	1 July	A national open-air museum (originally called the "Welsh Folk Museum") opens to the public at St Fagans Castle near Cardiff, the Earl of Plymouth having donated the site to the National Museum of Wales in 1946.
1948	5 July	The National Health Service is established in the UK as one of a series of welfare reforms designed to guarantee basic levels of personal and social security after the Second World War.
1951	17 July	Official opening of the Abbey Steelworks in Port Talbot; the new steel production plant is fully operational within two years.
1951	18 October	Snowdonia National Park is designated as the first national park in Wales; it has a total area of 823 square miles (2,130 km^{2}) and incorporates Snowdon, the highest mountain in Wales.
1952	29 February	Pembrokeshire Coast National Park is designated as the second national park in Wales; noted for its spectacular coastline, the park covers a total area of 236 square miles (612 km^{2}).
1952	15 August	Television becomes available in Wales for the first time following the switching on of the Wenvoe transmitting station.
1952	23 October	Completion of Elan Valley Reservoirs project, with the official opening of the Claerwen dam by Queen Elizabeth II.
1953		Further restoration work is carried out at Conwy Castle on lease to the UK's Ministry of Works.
1955	20 December	Cardiff is named the capital city of Wales.
1957	17 April	Brecon Beacons National Park is designated as the third of three national park in Wales; incorporating Pen y Fan, the highest peak in south Wales, the park covers a total area of 520 square miles (1,347 km^{2}).
1958	14 January	Independent television comes to Wales when TWW starts broadcasting across South Wales. Four years later, Wales West and North Television begins broadcasting to the northern areas of Wales.
1958	26 July	Prince Charles is named Prince of Wales at the closing ceremony of the British Empire and Commonwealth Games in Cardiff. (his investiture is delayed until July 1969)
1960–1970		Peak production at the Abbey Steelworks in Port Talbot: by the mid-1960s, the site has grown to be Europe's largest steel-producing complex and the largest single employer in Wales, with a workforce of over 18,000.
1961		Closure of the original steel mill at Port Talbot; the site is demolished a few years later.
1961	17 August	The Lower Swansea Valley Project is launched, with the aim of reclaiming the land that has been devastated by industrial processes over the past two centuries; the land will eventually house new developments such as the Maritime Quarter, a shopping complex, sports complex and industrial park.
1962	4 August	The Welsh Language Society (Cymdeithas yr Iaith Gymraeg) is established, to campaign for the right of Welsh people to use the Welsh language in every aspect of their lives.
1964	17 October	The post of Secretary of State for Wales is created in the UK government when Harold Wilson appoints the MP for Llanelli, Jim Griffiths, to the new role.
1965	21 October	Official opening of the Llyn Celyn reservoir, created by flooding parts of the Afon Tryweryn valley, including the village of Capel Celyn, for supplying water to Liverpool and parts of the Wirral Peninsula.
1966	14 July	Plaid Cymru gains its first seat in the UK Parliament, as Gwynfor Evans wins the Carmarthen bi-election.
1966	21 October	The Aberfan disaster kills 116 children and 28 adults.
1967	27 July	Parts of the Wales and Berwick Act 1746 that relate to the "dominion of Wales" are repealed by the Welsh Language Act 1967, allowing free use of the Welsh language in some political and legal proceedings.
1969	1 July	Prince Charles is invested as the Prince of Wales at Caernarfon Castle; the televised event attracts a world-wide audience of 500 million people, the largest TV audience ever gained for an event in Wales.
1970		Opening of Pembrokeshire Coast Path, a designated National Trail in Pembrokeshire, southwest Wales; mostly a cliff-top walking route, the path measures a total distance of 186 miles (299 km).
1971	10 July	Official opening of Offa's Dyke Path, a designated National Trail stretching for 177 miles (285 km) along the Wales–England border from the Severn Estuary to the Irish Sea coast, with a visitors' centre at the "half-way point" in Knighton, Powys.
1972	25 May	The National Slate Museum opens to the public in Llanberis, Gwynedd.
1974	1 April	Enactment of the Local Government Act 1972 replaces civil parishes with communities.
1976		Opening of the South Wales Miners' Museum in the Afan Forest Park, the first mining museum in Wales.
1976		The National Wool Museum is established at Dre-fach Felindre in Carmarthenshire.
1977	3 January	BBC Radio Cymru launches and becomes the first broadcasting outlet dedicated wholly to programmes in Welsh. The service is part-time, and it is not until the end of the decade that the station is on air for a significant number of hours each day.
1978	23 November	BBC Radio Wales launches on the former Radio 4 Welsh medium wave opt-out wavelength, initially with very limited broadcast hours; establishing a separate network is made possible by the transfer of Radio 4 to a fully UK-wide network on moving from medium wave to long wave.
1979	1 March	In the first Welsh devolution referendum, the electorate votes against establishing a devolved assembly.
1982	1 November	S4C begins broadcasting as Wales' fourth television channel. The channel broadcasts Welsh programming during peaktime and airs programmes from Channel 4, which launches the next day, during off-peak hours.
1983		The Big Pit National Coal Museum opens to the public in Blaenafon, southeast Wales.
1984	19 July	An earthquake measuring 5.4 on the Richter scale strikes the Llŷn Peninsula in Gwynedd, the largest earthquake to occur in the UK since instrumental measurements began.
1986		The Castles and Town Walls of King Edward in Gwynedd is added to the UNESCO World Heritage List, making it the first World Heritage Site in Wales.
1987	3 April	Cardiff Bay Development Corporation is set up by the UK government to redevelop an area of Cardiff to produce Cardiff Bay.
1987	September	Skerries Lighthouse becomes fully automated.
1989		Bodelwyddan Castle's portrait gallery exhibition is named National Heritage Museum of the Year.
1993	21 October	Enactment of the Welsh Language Act 1993 (c. 38) (Welsh: Deddf Yr Iaith Gymraeg 1993), an Act of the Parliament of the United Kingdom, which puts the Welsh language on an equal footing with the English language in Wales.
1996		Swansea City Council saves Swansea Museum from the threat of closure.
1997	18 September	The second Welsh devolution referendum results in a small majority in favour of forming a devolved assembly for Wales.
1998	31 July	The Government of Wales Act receives royal assent and becomes law, allowing a National Assembly for Wales to be established following elections to be held in May 1999.
1999	6 May	In the first National Assembly for Wales election, Welsh Labour wins the most seats but falls short of an overall majority, resulting in a minority Labour administration.
1999	27 May	Queen Elizabeth II and Charles, Prince of Wales, officially open the Welsh National Assembly at Crickhowell House in Cardiff Bay, a symbolic transfer of legislative powers from Westminster to Wales.
1999	26 June	The Millennium Stadium, the Welsh national stadium in Cardiff, opens in time to host the 1999 Rugby World Cup.

== 21st century ==
Year	Date	Event
2000	June	Don Wales (grandson of Sir Malcolm Campbell) sets a UK electric land speed record of 137 mph (220 km/h) on Pendine Sands in Bluebird Electric 2.
2000	30 June	Cardiff Bay Development Corporation is dissolved, after the completion of a major regeneration project at Cardiff Bay.
2000	21 July	Charles, Prince of Wales officially opens the National Botanic Garden of Wales, which has been open to the public since 24 May.
2000	14 September	Penderyn whisky begins production at its distillery in the Brecon Beacons National Park; this is the first commercially available malt whisky made in Wales since the 19th century.
2000	5 October	After operating as a minority government for seventeen months, the Welsh Labour Party agrees to form a coalition government with the Welsh Liberal Democrats in the Welsh Assembly; the coalition agreement is officially signed twelve days later.
2000	2 December	Blaenavon Industrial Landscape in southeast Wales is added to the UNESCO World Heritage List, making it the second World Heritage Site in Wales.
2000		Glyndwr's Way, a long-distance footpath in mid Wales, is granted National Trail status; the footpath runs for 135 miles (217 km) in an extended loop through Powys between Knighton and Welshpool.
2001	1 June	Official opening of Cardiff Bay Barrage, one of the largest civil engineering projects in Europe.
2001	July	Welsh communities pressure group Cymuned (meaning "Community") is launched at a meeting in Mynytho on the Llŷn Peninsula; the group aims to protect and foster the Welsh language and way of life.
2001	16 September	Actress Siân Phillips unveils a memorial statue to Catrin Glyndŵr in London, to commemorate "Glyndwr Day".
2002	June	The Newport medieval ship is discovered on the west bank of the River Usk during construction of Newport's Riverfront Arts Centre.
2002	5 August	Dr Rowan Williams, Archbishop of Wales, is honoured by admission to the Gorsedd of bards.
2002	July/August	Closure and demolition of Ebbw Vale Steelworks, resulting from the collapse of the international steel market.
2002	16 October	The Banc Ty'nddôl sun-disc is recovered during archaeological excavations on a Bronze Age site at Cwmystwyth in central Wales.
2002	2 December	Dr Rowan Williams is confirmed as the next Archbishop of Canterbury (to be enthroned in February).
2003		The North Wales edition of the Daily Post separates from the Liverpool Daily Post to become a standalone title. (Liverpool edition has since ceased)
2003	29 March	The Cob at Porthmadog is purchased by the Welsh Government and the road toll is discontinued after 192 years.
2003	1 May	The second National Assembly for Wales election is held, resulting in a minority government by Welsh Labour who choose not to enter into another coalition agreement.
2003	19 June	Prince William of Wales visits Bangor and Anglesey, to mark his 21st birthday (on 21 June).
2003	15 August	A memorial to Owain Lawgoch, descendant of Llywelyn the Great, is unveiled at Mortagne-sur-Gironde, France.
2003	November	A £1.1 million DTI grant is awarded to Energybuild, the private owner of the Aberpergwm Colliery in the Neath Valley, to upgrade facilities and allow new coal reserves to be accessed.
2003	21 November	North Hoyle Offshore Wind Farm, Wales' first offshore wind farm, commences operation.
2004	1 March	Penderyn whisky is officially launched in the presence of Prince Charles; demand is so high that the whisky sells out almost immediately.
2004	13 March	The market town of Cowbridge, one of the smallest and oldest walled towns in Wales, celebrates the 750th anniversary of its royal charter.
2004	26 November	Official opening of the Wales Millennium Centre, a large arts centre in Cardiff Bay.
2005	30 January	Cardiff's David Morgan store, the largest independent department store in Wales, closes after 125 years of trading.
2005	26 May	Big Pit National Coal Museum wins the Gulbenkian Prize for Museum of the Year 2005.
2005	13 July	Prince Charles opens a new building to house the Narrow Gauge Railway Museum at Tywyn Wharf railway station in Gwynedd.
2005	October	A Welsh language version of Scrabble is marketed for the first time.
2005	17 October	The National Waterfront Museum opens to the public in Swansea's Maritime Quarter.
2005	19 October	Liverpool City Council issues a formal apology for the flooding of the Afon Tryweryn valley to create the Llyn Celyn reservoir in 1965.
2005	1 December	Outlying properties in the Nedd Fechan valley, near Ystradfellte in southern Powys, are connected to mains electricity, probably the last community in the whole of England and Wales to be wired.
2006	1 March	The new National Assembly building opens in Cardiff Bay; designed by Richard Rogers and costing £67 million, it is known as the Senedd (the Welsh word for "parliament").
2006	25 July	Government of Wales Act 2006 comes into effect, conferring additional law-making powers on the National Assembly for Wales.
2007	1 April	Prescription charges are abolished by NHS Wales; the Welsh Government is the first devolved government of the UK to remove these charges.
2007	3 May	The third National Assembly for Wales election is held, resulting in a relative majority for Welsh Labour, while Plaid Cymru make considerable gains.
2007	27 June	Labour and Plaid Cymru announce their intention to form a coalition government, and enter into the One Wales agreement which includes holding a referendum on full law-making powers for the Welsh Assembly.
2008	25 January	Official closure of Tower Colliery in the Cynon Valley, South Wales, the last remaining deep coal mine to be worked in the whole of Wales.
2008	12 June	Cardiff Castle opens a new interpretation centre at a cost of £6 million.
2008	12 September	Completion of the Meridian Tower in Swansea's Maritime Quarter; the Tower is the tallest building in Wales, standing at a height of 107 metres (351 feet).
2008	20 November	AM and Heritage Minister Alun Ffred Jones becomes the first person to use the Welsh language as a representative of the UK government at a European Union meeting in Brussels.
2009	27 June	The Pontcysyllte Aqueduct is added to the UNESCO World Heritage List, making it the third World Heritage Site in Wales.
2009	22 October	The St David's Centre in Cardiff re-opens as one of the largest shopping centres in the United Kingdom after its multimillion-pound extension and the reconstruction of the surrounding area.
2010	18 March	Marriage (Wales) Act 2010 brings the Church in Wales' marriage regulations into line with those of the Church of England.
2010	31 March	Digital switchover is completed in Wales when the analogue transmissions at Wenvoe are switched off. Consequently, S4C begins broadcasting solely in Welsh and the channel no longer carries Channel 4 programmes due to Channel 4 becoming available full-time across all of Wales for the first time.
2010	12 May	Cardiff-born Conservative MP Cheryl Gillan is confirmed as Secretary of State for Wales in the new UK government, the first woman to hold the post.
2010	25 May	The Learned Society of Wales is launched at the National Museum in Cardiff.
2010	24 June	Barry-born Julia Gillard becomes Australia's first female prime minister.
2011	3 March	A further Welsh devolution referendum is held, which results in the Welsh Assembly receiving full law-making powers on all matters in the twenty fields (subject areas) where it has jurisdiction.
2011	5 May	In the 2011 National Assembly for Wales election, Welsh Labour wins exactly half of the contested seats and regains overall power in the Assembly.
2011	9 July	The National Museum of Art opens in Cardiff, created with £6.5 million of private and Welsh Government funding.
2011	1 October	Wales becomes the first UK nation to introduce a minimum 5p charge on single-use plastic carrier bags.
2012	April	New visitor centre opens at Conwy Castle.
2012	26–27 April	Queen Elizabeth II makes a two-day visit to South Wales as part of her Diamond Jubilee tour; the visit includes engagements in Llandaff, Margam, Merthyr Tydfil, Aberfan, Ebbw Vale and Glanusk Park.
2012	5 May	Opening of the Wales Coast Path, a long-distance walking route that closely follows the Welsh coastline for 861 miles (1,386 km).
2012	25 May	The Olympic Torch starts its five-day tour of Wales, as part of the 2012 Summer Olympics torch relay; Gareth John, the chairman of Disability Sport Wales, is the first person to bring the torch onto Welsh soil.
2012	25 July	The first events of the London 2012 Summer Olympics take place in Cardiff: two matches in the women's football competition are held at the Millennium Stadium.
2012	12 November	The National Assembly for Wales (Official Languages) Act 2012 receives royal assent; the first bill to be passed under the assembly's new legislative powers, it gives the Welsh and English languages equal status in the assembly.
2012	31 December	Rowan Williams retires from the position of Archbishop of Canterbury.
2013	February	The Brecon Beacons National Park is granted International Dark Sky Reserve status, to restrict artificial light pollution above the park; it is the first such area in Wales, the second in the UK and only the fifth worldwide.
2013	2 July	The Welsh Assembly brings into law a presumed consent ("soft opt-out") organ donation scheme, (officially adopted in December 2015).
2013	12 September	The Church in Wales passes a bill that will allow women to be consecrated as bishops.
2013	14 October	On the centenary of Britain's worst-ever mining disaster, the Welsh National Mining Memorial is unveiled within a dedicated garden at Senghenydd, in memory of all those who have died in the Welsh mines.
2014		Excavations carried out by the Clwyd-Powys Archaeological Trust, on parts of Offa's Dyke near Chirk, place construction in the period 541–651 AD, with lower layers dating to as early as 430 AD, suggesting that the Dyke may have been a long-term project by several Mercian kings.
2014	29–30 April	Queen Elizabeth II visits South Wales, two years after her previous visit for the Diamond Jubilee; her two-day itinerary includes Narberth, Picton Castle, Pembroke Dock, Ystrad Mynach and Llantwit Major.
2014	4–5 September	The 2014 NATO Summit is held at the Celtic Manor Resort in Newport; it is the first NATO summit to be held in the UK since 1990 and the first held anywhere in the UK other than London.
2015	15 April	After a £12 million restoration project, Cardigan Castle reopens as a heritage attraction and events venue.
2015	25 September	Ford approves a new £181 million range of petrol engines to be built at its car manufacturing plant in Bridgend, South Wales, securing 750 skilled jobs at the facility; production of the new engines will begin in 2018.
2015	1 December	Wales becomes the first nation in the UK to introduce a presumed consent scheme for organ donation, whereby adults are regarded as consenting to become donors unless they have specifically opted out.
2016	January	The Millennium Stadium, home of Welsh rugby, is renamed the Principality Stadium.
2016	23 June	In the United Kingdom European Union membership referendum, a 52.5% majority of voters in Wales vote to leave the EU, with 47.5% voting to remain.
2017	22 February	The British government confirms that MPs will be permitted in future to use the Welsh language during meetings of the Welsh Grand Committee.
2017	8 November	Tata Steel announces its intention to invest £30 million in its Port Talbot Steelworks, in a bid to safeguard the jobs of 4,000 employees at the plant, following plans to merge with German steel manufacturer ThyssenKrupp.
2018	20 March	Planning permission is granted by Neath Port Talbot Council to restart coal production at Aberpergwm Colliery, the last surviving drift mine in Wales, after operations were previously suspended in July 2015.
2018	2 July	Prince Charles attends a lowkey ceremony to rename the Second Severn Crossing as the "Prince of Wales Bridge", a move which is widely disliked by the Welsh public.
2019	January	Completion of a major blast furnace upgrade at the Port Talbot Steelworks, after a £50 million investment by Tata Steel; this follows years of uncertainty at the plant, with particular concerns over the UK's withdrawal from the European Union.
2019	6 June	Ford announces that its Bridgend Engine Plant will close in September 2020, with the loss of 1,700 jobs, blaming reduced global demand for the Ford GTDi 1.5-litre engine.
2019	3 July	St Fagans National Museum of History wins the Museum of the Year award for 2019.
2020	13 January	The Welsh Government approves the construction of a new bridge across the River Dyfi at Machynlleth, at a cost of £46 million.
2020	24 January	The Slate Landscape of North West Wales is nominated by the UK government for consideration as a UNESCO World Heritage Site.
2020	28 February	Authorities confirm the first case of COVID-19 in Wales, an individual who recently returned from holiday in Italy.
2020	18 March	The Welsh Government announces that all schools in Wales will close from the end of the week as a measure to help contain the spread of COVID-19 in Wales; the school closure lasts until the end of June.
2020	12 April	The new, temporary, Dragon's Heart Hospital opens at Cardiff's Millennium Stadium to admit its first COVID-19 patients.
2020	6 May	The National Assembly for Wales becomes "Senedd Cymru – Welsh Parliament" and its members become "Members of the Senedd" (MS) (Aelodau o'r Senedd (AS) in Welsh).
2020	25 September	Ford's Bridgend Engine Plant closes for decommissioning, ending 40 years of engine production at the site.
2021	28 July	The Slate Landscape of North West Wales is added to the UNESCO World Heritage List, making it the fourth World Heritage Site in Wales.
2022	8 September	Charles, Prince of Wales, becomes King Charles III of the United Kingdom following the death of his mother, Queen Elizabeth II of the United Kingdom.
2022	9 September	William, the elder son of King Charles III, is confirmed as the new Prince of Wales. His wife Catherine becomes Princess of Wales.
2022	16 September	King Charles III pays his first visit to Wales as monarch, to meet political leaders and attend a religious service.

== Sources ==
- Aldhouse-Green, Miranda; Howell, Ray (June 2004). Gwent in Prehistory and Early History: Gwent County History. Vol. 1. University of Wales Press. ISBN 978-0-7083-1826-3.
- Allison, Ronald (1991). Sarah Riddell (ed.). The Royal Encyclopedia (first ed.). Macmillan. ISBN 978-0-333-53810-4.
- Ashbee, Jeremy A. (December 2007). Conwy Castle. Cardiff, UK: Cadw Welsh Historic Monuments. ISBN 978-1-85760-259-3.
- Asser (January 1984). Alfred the Great: Asser's Life of King Alfred & Other Contemporary Sources. Translated by Keynes, Simon; Lapidge, Michael. Penguin Classics. ISBN 978-0-14-044409-4.
- Barrett, John C. (December 1994). Fragments from Antiquity: An Archaeology of Social Life in Britain, 2900–1200 BC. Blackwell Publishing. ISBN 978-0-631-18954-1.
- Bartrum, Peter C. (January 1993). A Welsh Classical Dictionary: People in History & Legend up to About A.D. 1000. National Library of Wales. ISBN 978-0-907158-73-8.
- Blackstone, William; Stewart, James (December 2010) [1839]. The rights of persons, according to the text of Blackstone: incorporating the alterations down to the present time. Gale. ISBN 978-1-240-18846-8.
- Browne, David & Griffiths, Ralph A. (December 2008). "Chapter 3: One hundred Years of Investigation". In Wakelin, Peter (ed.). Hidden Histories: Discovering the Heritage of Wales. Welsh Books Council / RCAHMW. ISBN 978-1-871184-35-8.
- Butler, Lawrence A. S. (December 2007). Denbigh Castle. Cadw Welsh Historic Monuments. ISBN 978-1-85760-238-8.
- Charles-Edwards, Thomas M. (February 2013). Wales and the Britons, 350–1064. Oxford University Press. ISBN 978-0-19-821731-2.
- Davies, John (January 1994). A History of Wales (1st ed.). Viking Press. ISBN 978-0-7139-9098-0.
- Davies, Robert Rees (December 2000). The Age of Conquest: Wales 1063–1415. Oxford University Press. ISBN 978-0-19-820878-5.
- Davies, Robert Rees (January 1996). The Revolt of Owain Glyn Dŵr. Oxford University Press. ISBN 978-0-19-820508-1.
- Farmer, David (June 2011) [1978]. The Oxford Dictionary of Saints (5th, revised ed.). Oxford University Press. ISBN 978-0-19-959660-7.
- France, John (January 1999). Western Warfare in the Age of the Crusades, 1000–1300. Routledge. ISBN 978-1-85728-467-6.
- Frere, Sheppard Sunderland (January 1988) [1967]. "The End of Roman Britain". Britannia: A History of Roman Britain (3rd, revised ed.). Routledge & Kegan Paul. ISBN 978-0-7102-1215-3.
- Gilbert, Bentley Brinkerhoff (December 1987). David Lloyd George: A Political Life: The Architect of Change 1863–1912. London: B.T. Batsford Ltd. ISBN 978-0-7134-5558-8.
- Goodbody, Axel (April 2003) [2002]. Fox, Adam; Woolf, Daniel (eds.). The Spoken Word: Oral Culture in Britain, 1500–1850. Manchester University Press. ISBN 978-0-7190-5747-2.
- Grant, R. G., ed. (May 2011). 1001 Battles That Changed the Course of World History. Universe Publishing. ISBN 978-0-7893-2233-3.
- Higham, Nicholas J. (March 1993). Rome, Britain and the Anglo-Saxons (Archaeology of Change). Trafalgar Square Publishing. ISBN 978-1-85264-022-4.
- Hull, Lise E. (December 2005). Britain's Medieval Castles. Praeger Publishing. ISBN 978-0-275-98414-4.
- Jones, Barri; Mattingly, David J. (March 2007). "The Economy". An Atlas of Roman Britain (2nd ed.). Blackwell Publishing. ISBN 978-1-84217-067-0.
- Jones, John Graham (February 2015) [1824]. The History of Wales (3rd ed.). University of Wales Press. ISBN 978-1-78316-168-3.
- Kenyon, John R. (December 2003). Raglan Castle. Cadw Welsh Historic Monuments. ISBN 978-1-85760-169-5.
- Kirby, D. P. (November 2002) [1992]. The Earliest English Kings (2nd ed.). Routledge. ISBN 978-0-415-24211-0.
- Laws, Edward (March 2011) [1888]. The History of Little England Beyond Wales, and the Non-Kymric Colony settled in Pembrokeshire. British Library, Historical Print Editions. ISBN 978-1-241-43497-7.
- Lloyd, John Edward (October 2013) [1912]. A History of Wales from the Earliest Times to the Edwardian Conquest, Volume 1. Nabu Press. ISBN 978-1-293-00005-2.
- Lynch, Frances; Aldhouse-Green, Stephen; Davies, Jeffrey L. (April 2000). Prehistoric Wales. Sutton Publishing. ISBN 978-0-7509-2165-7.
- Maund, K. L. (June 1991). Ireland, Wales, and England in the Eleventh Century (Studies in Celtic History). Boydell & Brewer. ISBN 978-0-85115-533-3.
- Pettifer, Adrian (August 2000). Welsh Castles: A Guide by Counties (1st ed.). Boydell & Brewer. ISBN 978-0-851-15778-8.
- Phillips, John Roland (1874). Memoirs of the Civil War in Wales and the Marches. Longmans, Green, & Co.
- Phillips, Seymour (January 2012). Edward II (The English Monarchs Series). Yale University Press. ISBN 978-0-300-17802-9.
- Pollard, Joshua (December 2001). "Wales' Hidden History c.25,000 BC – c.AD 383, Hunter-Gatherer Communities in Wales: The Neolithic". In Morgan, Prys; Aldhouse-Green, Stephen (eds.). History of Wales 25,000 BC – AD 2000. Stroud, Gloucestershire: Tempus Publishing. ISBN 978-0-7524-1983-1.
- Rosen, William (December 2007). Justinian's Flea: Plague, Empire and the Birth of Europe (1st ed.). Viking Press. ISBN 978-0-224-07369-1.
- Rowlands, Michael L. J. (April 1994). Monnow Bridge and Gate. Sutton Publishing. ISBN 978-0-7509-0415-5.
- Royle, Trevor (August 2010) [2009]. The Wars of the Roses: England's First Civil War. Abacus. ISBN 978-0-349-11790-4.
- Saul, Nigel (May 1997). Richard II (The English Monarchs Series). New Haven: Yale University Press. ISBN 978-0-300-07003-3.
- Stenton, Frank M. (September 2001) [1971]. Anglo-Saxon England (3rd ed.). Oxford University Press. ISBN 978-0-19-280139-5.
- Takacs, Sarolta Anna; Cline, Eric H. (March 2008). The Ancient World. Routledge. ISBN 978-0-7656-8082-2.
- Taylor, Arnold J. (December 1999) [1980]. Beaumaris Castle (5th, revised ed.). Cadw Welsh Historic Monuments. ISBN 978-1-85760-208-1.
- Taylor, Arnold J. (December 2007). Harlech Castle. Cadw Welsh Historic Monuments. ISBN 978-1-85760-257-9.
- Weir, Alison (August 2006). Isabella: She-Wolf of France, Queen of England. London: Pimlico. ISBN 978-0-7126-4194-4.
- Williams, David (1950). A Short History of Modern Wales (First ed.). London: John Murray. ISBN 978-0-7195-1531-6.
- Williams, Glyn (1975). The desert and the Dream: A study of Welsh Colonization in Chubut, 1865–1915. University of Wales Press. ISBN 978-0-7083-0579-9.
- Williams (Ysgafell), Jane (November 2010) [1869]. A History of Wales: Derived from Authentic Sources. Cambridge University Press. ISBN 978-1-108-02085-5.
