= Timeline of British history (before 1000) =

This article presents a timeline of events in British history before 1000.

Timeline of Prehistoric Britain Timeline of British history (1000-1499)

== To 999 ==
=== AD ===
- 43: Roman invasion of Britain, ordered by Claudius, who dispatches Aulus Plautius and an army of some 40,000 men
- 60: Revolt against the Roman occupation, led by Boudica of the Iceni, begins
- c. 84: Romans defeat Caledonians at the battle of Mons Graupius
- 122: Construction of Hadrian's Wall begins.
- 142: Construction of Antonine Wall in Scotland begins.
- 286: The Carausian revolt begins when Carausius declared himself emperor over Britain and northern Gaul.
- c. 383: Beginning of Roman withdrawal from Britain
- 410: The last Roman leaves Britain and tells the natives to defend themselves from other invaders overseas, as Rome is under attack from the Goths
- 449: According to the Anglo-Saxon Chronicle, Hengist and Horsa (Saxon leader), arrives in England
- c. 466: Battle of Wippedesfleot
- 597: Arrival of St. Augustine
- 793: Vikings raid Lindisfarne
- 802: Vikings ransack monastery on Iona
- 843: Birth of Kingdom of Scotland with union of the Picts and the Scots
- 878: Battle of Edington, defeat of Viking forces, results in Treaty of Wedmore and establishment of the Danelaw
- 895: Danish fleet captured by Alfred the Great
- 927: Æthelstan first used the title "king of the English" and is considered the founder of the English monarchy.

== See also ==
- British Iron Age
- Early Middle Ages
- Timeline of British history
- History of the British Isles
- History of England
- History of Ireland
- History of Northern Ireland
- History of Scotland
- History of Wales
- History of the United Kingdom
- Prehistory
