= Blegywryd =

Blegywryd is a Welsh name which may refer to:

- Blegywryrd, a jurist sometimes credited with compiling the Laws of Hywel Dda
- Blegywryd, father of Aeddan (d. 1018), a ruler of Gwynedd
