= Timeline of British history (1000–1499) =

This article presents a timeline of events in British history from 1000 AD until 1499 AD.

== 11th century ==
- 1002 – Æthelred orders St Brice's Day massacre of Danes
- 1013 – Danish invasion of England: Æthelred the Unready exiled to Normandy, Sweyn Forkbeard seizes the English throne
- 1014 – Death of Sweyn Forkbeard, Æthelred restored to the English throne
- 1016 – Death of Æthelred the Unready, Edmund Ironside accedes to the English throne
- 1016 – Cnut's invasion of England
- 1016 – Death of Edmund Ironside, Cnut accedes to the English throne
- 1034 – Death of King Malcolm II of Scotland, Duncan I of Scotland accedes to the Scottish throne
- 1035 – Death of Cnut, Harold Harefoot became regent of England for 2 years before becoming king of England in 1037
- 1040 – Death of Duncan I, Macbeth accedes to the Scottish throne
- 1040 – Death of Harold Harefoot, his brother Harthacnut accedes to the English throne
- 1042 – Death of Harthacnut, Edward the Confessor accedes to the English throne
- 1057 – Death of Macbeth, Lulach accedes to the Scottish throne
- 1058 – Death of Lulach, Malcolm III accedes to the Scottish throne
- 1066 – Death of Edward the Confessor in January, Harold II accedes to the English throne.
- 1066 – Norman Conquest: Death of Harold II at Battle of Hastings, William the Conqueror seizes the English throne
- 1070 – Harrying of the North
- 1078 – Work commenced on Tintern Abbey
- 1086 – Work commenced on the Domesday Book
- 1087 – Death of William the Conqueror, William II accedes to the English throne
- 1093 – Death of Malcolm III of Scotland in battle against the English
- 1100 – Death of William II, Henry I accedes to the English throne
- 1100 – White Tower (Tower of London) completed

== 12th century ==
- 1135 Death of Henry I, accession of King Stephen to English throne
- 1137 Beginning of a civil war between King Stephen and the Empress Matilda over the succession to the English throne; accession of Owain Gwynedd, the first Welsh ruler to style himself prince of Wales
- 1154 Death of King Stephen, accession of Henry II to the English throne
- 1164 Constitutions of Clarendon, a set of laws which governs the trial of members of the Church in England
- 1170 Assassination of Thomas Becket; death of Owain Gwynedd, prince of Wales
- 1189 Death of Henry II, Richard I accedes to the English throne.
- 1192 Richard is captured by Duke Leopold of Austria whilst returning from the Crusades
- 1194 Richard is ransomed and returns to England; accession of Llywelyn ab Iorwerth to the throne of Gwynedd
- 1199 Death of Richard I, King John accedes to the English throne

== 13th century ==
- 1209 King John excommunicated by Pope Innocent III
- 1212 Great Fire of 1212 began in July in Southwark, London
- 1215 Magna Carta is agreed by King John at Runnymede
- 1216 Death of King John, Henry III succeeds to the throne of England
- 1237 Border between Scotland and England by the Treaty of York
- 1240 Death of Llywelyn ab Iorwerth, prince of Wales; Dafydd ap Llywelyn succeeds to the throne of Gwynedd
- 1246 Death of Dafydd ap Llywelyn; Llywelyn ap Gruffudd succeeds to the throne of Gwynedd (he does not claim the title of prince of Wales until 1258)
- 1249 Death of Alexander II, king of Scots; Alexander III succeeds to the throne of Scotland
- 1263 Battle of Largs, an inconclusive battle fought between Haakon IV of Norway and the Scots
- 1264 Simon de Montfort leads rebel English barons to defeat Henry III at the Battle of Lewes
- 1265 Simon de Montfort was defeated at the Battle of Evesham, 5,000 men died in Greenhill and the streets of Evesham on 4 August 1265 Henry III at the Battle of Evesham
- 1266 Scotland and Norway sign the Treaty of Perth under which Scottish control of the Western Isles is acknowledged
- 1267 Henry III of England recognises the authority of Llywelyn ap Gruffudd in Wales
- 1272 Death of Henry III, Edward I succeeds to the English throne
- 1277 England annexes Wales, a state of affairs which lasted until 1283
- 1279 The first Statutes of Mortmain was passed
- 1282 Death of Llywelyn ap Gruffudd, prince of Wales; Dafydd ap Gruffydd succeeds to the throne of Gwynedd
- 1283 Death of Dafydd ap Gruffydd; English conquest of Wales
- 1287 Revolt of Rhys ap Maredudd in Wales
- 1290 The second Statutes of Mortmain was passed (also known as Quia Emptores)
- 1294 Welsh revolt of 1294–95 of Madog ap Llywelyn in Wales
- 1297 William Wallace and the Scots defeat the English at the Battle of Stirling Bridge

== 14th century ==
- 1305 Capture and execution of Scottish resistance fighter William Wallace by the English on a charge of treason
- 1306 Robert the Bruce kills John Comyn III of Badenoch and is crowned King of Scotland
- 1307 Death of Edward I, Edward II accedes to the English throne
- 1314 Decisive victory for Scotland over England at the Battle of Bannockburn
- 1316 Revolt of Llywelyn Bren in south Wales
- 1322 Edward II defeats a rebellious baronial faction at Battle of Boroughbridge
- 1327 Edward III usurps the English throne in January, Edward II is killed in September
- 1328 England recognises Scotland's independence in the Treaty of Edinburgh–Northampton
- 1338 Edward III claims the throne of France, initiating the Hundred Years' War
- 1348 The Black Death first arrives in England and ultimately kills c. one third of the population
- 1356 Battle of Poitiers
- 1377 Death of Edward III, his grandson Richard II accedes to the English throne
- 1381 Peasants' Revolt, began in May and ended in November
- 1392 Statute of Praemunire was enacted
- 1399 Henry Bolingbroke usurps the English throne becoming Henry IV

== 15th century ==
- 1413 – Henry IV dies and is succeeded by his son, Henry V
- 1415 – Henry V is welcomed back to England after a major victory at the Battle of Agincourt, France
- 1422 – Henry V dies and is succeeded by his son, Henry VI
- 1471 – Henry VI is murdered and Edward IV is restored to the English throne
- 1453 – Hundred Years' War ended
- 1455 – Wars of the Roses began in May
- 1483 – Death of Edward IV, Edward V accedes to the throne
- 1485 – The Battle of Bosworth Field on 22 August ends the Yorkist reign of Richard III and ushers in Tudor reign, with the reign of Henry VII
- 1487 – The Battle of Stoke Field is fought between Henry VII and Lambert Simnel a Yorkist claimant to the throne. It is the last battle of the Wars of the Roses

== See also ==
- Timeline of British history
- History of England
- History of Ireland
- History of Northern Ireland
- History of Scotland
- History of Wales
- History of the British Isles
- Britain in the Middle Ages
