= Timeline of British history =

This is a timeline of British history, comprising important legal and territorial changes and political events in the United Kingdom and its predecessor states. To read about the background to these events, see History of England, History of Wales, History of Scotland, History of Ireland, Formation of the United Kingdom of Great Britain and Northern Ireland and History of the United Kingdom.

== 1st century BC ==
Year	Date	Event
55 BC	1 January	Roman General Julius Caesar invades Great Britain for the first time, gaining a beachhead on the coast of Kent.
54 BC	?	Caesar invades for the second time, gaining a third of the country. These two invasions are known as Caesar's invasions of Britain.

== 1st century ==
Year	Date	Event
43	?	Aulus Plautius leads an army of forty thousand to invade Great Britain. Emperor Claudius makes Britain a part of the Roman Empire. This is known as the Roman conquest of Britain.
50	?	London is destroyed.
61	?	Boudica's organised rebellion against the Romans is defeated.

== 2nd century ==
Year	Date	Event
122	?	Emperor Hadrian orders a wall to be built to mark Roman territory of Britain in the north.
197	?	Britain is divided into two parts – Britannia Superior and Britannia Inferior.

== 3rd century ==
3rd Century Britain: Wikipage

Year	Date	Event
206	?	Governor Lucius Alfenus Senecio repairs Hadrian's Wall and appeals for help from the Emperor against the northern tribes.
208	?	Emperor Septimius Severus and his son Caracalla take personal command of the army in Britain.
209	?	Severus and Caracalla lead an expedition against the Caledonii, and build forts at Cramond and the Tay estuary.
210	?	Caracalla leads an expedition against the rebellious Maeatae tribe.
211	?	4 February – Severus dies at York, while preparing another expedition against the northern rebels. Caracalla, now Emperor, abandons territory north of Hadrian's Wall, and returns to Rome
c. 214	?	Britain divided into two provinces, Britannia Superior and Britannia Inferior, with administrative centres at London and York respectively
c. 220	?	Saxons raid south-east coast; forts built at Reculver and Branodunum (Brancaster).
245	?	Many thousands of acres of modern-day Lincolnshire are inundated by a great flood.
255	?	Work begins on a riverside wall in London.
259	?	Rebel leader Latinus Postumus proclaims Britain as part of his "Empire of the Gauls".
270	?	Construction of forts along the Saxon Shore begins in response to increased raiding.
273	?	Stone walls built around St Albans.
274	?	Postumus's Gallic Empire is reabsorbed into the Roman Empire under Aurelian.
277	?	Imperial edict lifts restrictions on British wine production. General Victorinus puts down revolt, and settles Burgundian and Vandal prisoners in Britain.
286–296		Britannic Empire
287	?	Mausaeus Carausius takes power in Britain and proclaims himself Emperor
289	?	Carausius defeats Emperor Maximian in a naval battle.
293	?	Finance minister Allectus murders Carausius and seizes power; employs Frankish mercenaries.
296	?	Julius Constantius defeats Britons near Silchester, killing Allectus; prevents retreating Franks from sacking London
297	?	Re-building of forts near Hadrian's Wall begins. Constantius returns to Gaul. First mention on record of the Picts attacking from the north in Eumenius' Panegyrici Latini.

== 11th century ==
Year	Date	Event
1017	?	Cnut the Great is crowned king of England in London.
1034	25 November	Malcolm II of Scotland dies at Glamis. He is succeeded as king of Scotland by his grandson Duncan I the Diseased of Scotland.
1035	12 November	Cnut dies. He is succeeded as king of England, Denmark and Norway by his son Harthacnut.
1040	17 March	Harold Harefoot dies at Oxford. Harthacnut, his brother, succeeds him as king of England.
1040	14 August	Duncan the Diseased is killed in action at Elgin, Moray attempting to suppress a rebellion by Macbeth, King of Scotland, Mormaer of Moray, who replaces him as king of Scotland.
1042	8 June	Harthacnut dies, probably due to a stroke after excessive drinking at a wedding in Lambeth. He is succeeded as king of England by his brother Edward the Confessor.
1057	15 August	Battle of Lumphanan: Macbeth is killed in battle at Lumphanan by Duncan the Diseased's son Malcolm III of Scotland. He is succeeded as king of Scotland by his stepson Lulach.
1058	17 March	Lulach is assassinated by Malcolm III, who succeeds him as king of Kingdom of Scotland.
1066	5 January	Edward the Confessor dies, probably after a series of strokes. He is succeeded as king of England by his brother-in-law Harold Godwinson.
1066	28 September	Norman conquest of England: William the Conqueror, duke of Normandy, lands with an army at Pevensey.
1066	14 October	Battle of Hastings: Harold Godwinson is killed in battle against the forces of William the Conqueror at Battle, East Sussex, causing the collapse of his army.
1066	25 December	William the Conqueror is crowned king of England at Westminster Abbey.
1078	?	The construction of Tintern Abbey begins.
1086	12 june	A census begins whose results would be collected in the Domesday Book.
1087	9 September	William the Conqueror dies at Rouen. He is succeeded by one son, Robert Curthose, as duke of Normandy and by another, William II of England, as king of England.
1093	13 November	Battle of Alnwick (1093): Malcolm III and his eldest son are ambushed and killed at Alnwick by an army of knights led by Robert de Mowbray, earl of Northumbria.
1100	2 August	William II is killed by an arrow through the lung while hunting in the New Forest. He is succeeded by his brother Henry I of England.
1100	?	The White Tower of London is completed.

== 12th century ==
Year	Date	Event
1135	1 December	Henry I dies of illness.
1135	22 December	Stephen, King of England is crowned king of England at Westminster Abbey.
1137	?	The Anarchy: Stephen enters Normandy in an attempt to conquer it from Empress Matilda, his rival for the succession in Normandy and England.
1137	?	Gruffudd ap Cynan, king of Gynedd, dies. He is succeeded by his son Owain Gwynedd.
1154	25 October	Stephen dies of a stomach disease. He is succeeded as king of England by Henry II of England, grandson of Henry I.
1164	?	Henry II issues the Constitutions of Clarendon, which provided that members of the Catholic Church accused of serious crimes would be tried and sentenced in secular courts.
1170	28 November	Owain dies.
1170	29 December	Thomas Becket, archbishop of Canterbury, is murdered in Canterbury Cathedral by followers of Henry II.
1189	6 July	Henry II dies of illness at Château de Chinon. He is succeeded as king of England by his son Richard I of England.
1192	December	Richard is captured near Vienna on the orders of Leopold V, Duke of Austria, duke of Austria, while returning from the Crusades.
1194	4 February	Richard is released following the payment of fifty tons of silver to Austria.
1194	?	Battle of Aberconwy: Llywelyn the Great defeats his uncle Dafydd ab Owain Gwynedd, one of two princes of Kingdom of Gwynedd, in battle.
1199	6 April	Richard dies of a crossbow wound sustained two weeks earlier during a siege of Château de Châlus-Chabrol. He was succeeded as king of England by his brother John, King of England.

== 13th century ==
Year	Date	Event
1209	November	The pope Pope Innocent III excommunicates John.
1215	15 June	John agrees to Magna Carta, granting political rights including the right to a fair trial to his barons.
1216	19 October	John dies of illness. He is succeeded as king of England by his son Henry III of England.
1237	25 September	Henry III and Alexander II of Scotland sign the Treaty of York, under which the latter renounced his claims on English territory in Northumberland, Cumberland and Westmorland.
1240	11 April	Death of Llywelyn ab Iorwerth, prince of Wales; Dafydd ap Llywelyn succeeds to the throne of Gwynedd.
1246	25 February	Death of Dafydd ap Llywelyn; Llywelyn ap Gruffudd succeeds to the throne of Gwynedd (he does not claim the title of prince of Wales until 1258).
1249	6 July	Death of Alexander II, king of Scots; Alexander III succeeds to the throne of Scotland.
1263	2 October	Battle of Largs, an inconclusive battle, is fought between Haakon IV of Norway and the Scots.
1264	14 May	Simon de Montfort leads rebel English barons to defeat Henry III at the Battle of Lewes.
1266	2 July	Scotland and Norway sign the Treaty of Perth under which Scottish control of the Western Isles is acknowledged.
1267	September	Henry III of England recognises the authority of Llywelyn ap Gruffudd in Wales.
1272	16 November	Death of Henry III, Edward I succeeds to the English throne.
1277	July	England annexes Wales, a state of affairs which lasted until 1283.
1279	?	Statute of Mortmain.
1282	11 December	Death of Llywelyn ap Gruffudd, prince of Wales; Dafydd ap Gruffudd succeeds to the throne of Gwynedd.
1283	3 October	Death of Dafydd ap Gruffudd; English conquest of Wales.
1287	?	Revolt of Rhys ap Maredudd in Wales.
1294	29 September	Revolt of Madog ap Llywelyn in Wales.
1297	11 September	William Wallace and the Scots defeat the English at the Battle of Stirling Bridge.

== 14th century ==
Year	Date	Event
1305	23 August	Capture and execution of Scottish resistance fighter William Wallace by the English on a charge of treason.
1307	7 July	Death of Edward I, Edward II accedes to the English throne.
1314	24 June	Decisive victory for Scotland over England at the Battle of Bannockburn.
1316	28 January	Revolt of Llywelyn Bren in South Wales.
1322	16 March	Edward II defeats a rebellious baronial faction at Battle of Boroughbridge.
1327	25 January	Edward III usurps the English throne.
1327	21 September	Edward II is killed.
1328	?	England recognises Scotland's independence in the Treaty of Edinburgh–Northampton
1338	?	Edward III claims the throne of France, initiating the Hundred Years' War.
1348	June	The Black Death first arrives in England and ultimately kills c. one third of the population.
1356	19 September	Battle of Poitiers.
1377	21 June	Death of Edward III, his grandson Richard II accedes to the English throne.
1381	30 May – November	Peasants' Revolt of 1381.
1392	?	Statute of Praemunire.
1399	30 September	Henry Bolingbroke usurps the English throne becoming Henry IV.

== 15th century ==
Year	Date	Event
1413	20 March	Henry IV dies and is succeeded by his son, Henry V.
1415	25 October	Henry V is welcomed back to England after a major victory at the Battle of Agincourt, France.
1422	31 August	Henry V dies and is succeeded by his son, Henry VI.
1471	21 May	Henry VI is murdered and Edward IV is restored to the English throne.
1483	9 April	Death of Edward IV, Edward V accedes to the throne.
1485	22 August	The Battle of Bosworth Field ends the Yorkist reign of Richard III and ushers in Tudor reign, with the reign of Henry VII.
1487	16 June	The Battle of Stoke is fought between Henry VII and Lambert Simnel a Yorkist claimant to the throne. It is the last battle of the Wars of the Roses.

== 16th century ==
Year	Date	Event
1509	22 April	England – Henry VIII crowned and married to Catherine of Aragon.
1513	9 September	England and Scotland – James IV and thousands of Scots killed in defeat at the battle of Flodden.
1513	21 September	Scotland – James V crowned King.
1516	?	England – Royal Mail is originally established.
1521	?	England – Lutheran writings begin to circulate.
1525	?	England – Henry VIII seeks an annulment of his marriage, which is refused.
1526	?	England – Cardinal Wolsey orders the burning of Lutheran books.
1532	?	Scotland – Creation of the College of Justice and the Court of Session.
1534	3 November	Act of Supremacy passed by Henry VIII
1534	18 December	England – Treasons Act 1534.
1535	22 June	England – Execution of Cardinal John Fisher.
1535	6 July	England – Execution of Thomas More.
1536	6 October	England – Execution of William Tindale in Antwerp.
1542	14 December	Scotland – Mary, Queen of Scots, accedes to the Scottish throne.
1547	28 January	England – Edward VI crowned King.
1549	6 June – 17 August	England – Prayer Book Rebellion in south-west.
1553	July	England – Mary I accedes to the throne.
1558	17 November	England – Elizabeth I accedes to the throne.
1559	April	England – Act of Supremacy 1559.
1559	2 May	Scotland – John Knox returns from Geneva to promote Calvinism.
1560	1 August	Scotland – Parliament legislates Protestant Reformation of the Church of Scotland.
1563	4 June	Scotland – Witchcraft Act 1563.
1567	24 July	Scotland – The Catholic Mary, Queen of Scots, abdicates and flees Scotland after an uprising by Protestant lords
1571	May	England – Treasons Act 1571.
1582	14 April	Scotland – Establishment of the University of Edinburgh by Royal Charter.
1587	8 February	England and Scotland – Execution of Mary, Queen of Scots, at Fotheringhay Castle in Northamptonshire.
1588	8 August	England – Spanish Armada destroyed.
1592	?	Scotland – James VI enacts the "Golden Act" recognising the power of Presbyterianism within the Scottish church.

== 17th century ==
Year	Date	Event
1603	24 March	England – Death of Queen Elizabeth I. James VI of Scotland crowned King of England (as James I of England).
1605	5 November	England and Scotland – The Gunpowder Plot is uncovered, in which Guy Fawkes and others attempted to blow up the king, James VI and I and the Parliament of England.
1606	10 April	England – King James I issues the First Virginia Charter, establishing the Colony of Virginia in North America.
1618	29 October	England – Execution of Sir Walter Raleigh
1625	27 March	England and Scotland – Death of James VI and I.
1639–1644	?	England and Scotland – At war in what became known as the Bishops' Wars.
1640	November	England – The Long Parliament summoned.
1642	22 August	England – English Civil War begins (see Timeline of the English Civil War).
1652	?	England – Tea arrives in Britain.
1666	2 – 6 September	England – The Great Fire of London ravages the city.
1688	11 December	England – The Glorious Revolution replaces James II with William III.
1689	April	Scotland – The Claim of Right Act 1689 is enacted by the Parliament of Scotland.
1689	16 December	England – The Bill of Rights 1689 is enacted by the Parliament of England.
1694	27 July	England – The Bank of England is established.

== 18th century ==
Year	Date	Event
1707	1 May	The Kingdom of Great Britain comes into being, and Queen Anne becomes its first monarch.
1713	11 April	Signing of the Treaty of Utrecht ends the War of the Spanish Succession.
1714	1 August	Queen Anne dies. Accession of George I, Elector of Hanover.
1721	3 April	Robert Walpole becomes the first prime minister of Great Britain.
1727	11 June	King George I dies and George II ascends the throne.
1742	16 February	Spencer Compton, 1st Earl of Wilmington becomes prime minister.
1743	27 August	Henry Pelham becomes prime minister.
1754	16 March	Thomas Pelham-Holles, 1st Duke of Newcastle becomes prime minister.
1755	15 April	Samuel Johnson published his A Dictionary of the English Language.
1756	16 November	William Cavendish, 4th Duke of Devonshire becomes prime minister.
1757	29 June	Thomas Pelham-Holles, 1st Duke of Newcastle becomes Prime Minister for the second time.
1760	25 October	King George II dies and George III ascends the throne.
1762	26 May	John Stuart, 3rd Earl of Bute becomes prime minister.
1763	16 April	George Grenville becomes prime minister.
1764	?	The Castle of Otranto is written and published, which was the first-ever story classed as a gothic horror story.
1765	13 July	Charles Watson-Wentworth, 2nd Marquess of Rockingham becomes prime minister.
1766	30 July	William Pitt, 1st Earl of Chatham becomes prime minister.
1768	14 October	Augustus FitzRoy, 3rd Duke of Grafton becomes prime minister.
1770	28 January	Frederick North, Lord North becomes prime minister.
1775	19 April	The American War of Independence begins.
1776	4 July	The Declaration of Independence is created and the new country is recognised as the USA.
1777–1779	November 1777 – July 1779	The world's first iron bridge called The Iron Bridge, is built-in Shropshire.
1782	27 March	Charles Watson-Wentworth, 2nd Marquess of Rockingham becomes Prime Minister for the second time.
1782	4 July	William Petty, 2nd Earl of Shelburne becomes prime minister.
1783	2 April	William Cavendish-Bentinck, 3rd Duke of Portland becomes prime minister.
1783	4 September	The American War of Independence ends with the Treaty of Paris.
1783	19 December	William Pitt the Younger becomes prime minister.
1785	1 January	The Times is first published and becomes the first newspaper to have borne that name, lending it to numerous other papers around the world, such as The New York Times.

== 19th century ==
Year	Date	Event
1801	1 January	The United Kingdom of Great Britain and Ireland comes into being, and King George III becomes its first monarch.
1801	17 March	Henry Addington, 1st Viscount Sidmouth becomes prime minister.
1804	10 May	William Pitt the Younger becomes Prime Minister for the second time.
1805	21 October	The naval Battle of Trafalgar takes place.
1806	11 February	William Grenville, 1st Baron Grenville becomes prime minister.
1807	25 March	The Slave Trade Act 1807 is passed.
1807	31 March	William Cavendish-Bentinck, 3rd Duke of Portland becomes Prime Minister for the second time.
1809	4 October	Spencer Perceval becomes prime minister.
1810		Discovery of the first complete Icthyosaur by Mary Anning
1812	8 June	Robert Jenkinson, 2nd Earl of Liverpool becomes prime minister.
1815	18 June	The Battle of Waterloo takes place.
1815	20 November	The Napoleonic Wars ends.
1819	22 August	SS Savannah undergoes the first steamship transatlantic crossing.
1820	29 January	King George III dies and George IV ascends the throne.
1820	1 April - 8 April	Attempted revolution in Scotland known as the Radical War
1821	5 May	The Guardian is first published, as The Manchester Guardian.
1823		Discovery of Plesiosaurus by Mary Anning
1825	27 September	The Stockton and Darlington railway, the world's first public passenger railway, opens.
1827	12 April	George Canning becomes prime minister.
1827	31 August	F. J. Robinson, 1st Viscount Goderich becomes prime minister.
1828	22 January	Arthur Wellesley, 1st Duke of Wellington becomes prime minister.
1828		Discovery of Pterodactylus by Mary Anning
1829	13 April	The Roman Catholic Relief Act 1829 is passed.
1830	26 June	King George IV dies and William IV ascends the throne.
1830	22 November	Charles Grey, 2nd Earl Grey becomes prime minister.
1831	1 June - 7 June	Protestors temporarily control Merthyr Tydfil, known as the Merthyr Rising
1832	7 June	The Great Reform Act is passed, doubling the franchise.
1833	28 August	The Slavery Abolition Act 1833 gains royal assent, banning slavery throughout the British Empire.
1834	?	The Conservative Party is founded.
1834	16 July	William Lamb, 2nd Viscount Melbourne becomes prime minister.
1834	14 August	The New Poor Law is passed.
1834	17 November	Arthur Wellesley, 1st Duke of Wellington becomes Prime Minister for the second time.
1834	10 December	Robert Peel becomes prime minister.
1835	18 April	William Lamb, 2nd Viscount Melbourne becomes Prime Minister for the second time.
1837	20 June	The reign of Queen Victoria begins.
1838	1 August	The Slavery Abolition Act 1833 enters into force, abolishing slavery in the British Empire.
1838	17 September	The London and Birmingham Railway opens, the first intercity railway line into London and now the southern part of the West Coast Main Line.
1840	10 January	The first postage stamps (Penny Post) come into use.
1840	June	Vaccination for the poor is introduced.
1841	30 August	Robert Peel becomes Prime Minister for the second time.
1842	Summer	The first peacetime income tax is introduced.
1846	27 January	The Corn Laws are repealed.
1846	30 June	John Russell, 1st Earl Russell becomes prime minister.
1848	15 February	For the first time, it becomes possible to travel between London and Scotland entirely by rail, over the route later known as the West Coast Main Line.
1848	Late February	The Communist Manifesto is published by Karl Marx and Friedrich Engels.
1850	29 August	Queen Victoria opens the Royal Border Bridge, completing a continuous railway line between London and Edinburgh, later known as the East Coast Main Line.
1851	1 May	The Great Exhibition opens.
1852	23 February	Edward Smith-Stanley, 14th Earl of Derby becomes prime minister.
1852	14 October	King's Cross station opens in London as the terminus of the East Coast route to Edinburgh (later the East Coast Main Line), at the time the largest railway station in Britain.
1852	19 December	George Hamilton-Gordon, 4th Earl of Aberdeen becomes prime minister.
1853–1856	16 October 1853 – 30 March 1856	The Crimean War is fought between Russia and a British alliance who feared Russian expansion in the Balkans, resulting in allied victory.
1854	?	Doctor John Snow discovers that cholera is from contaminated water
1855	6 February	Henry John Temple, 3rd Viscount Palmerston becomes prime minister.
1855	29 June	The Daily Telegraph is first published.
1858	20 February	Edward Smith-Stanley, 14th Earl of Derby becomes Prime Minister for the second time.
1859	12 June	Henry John Temple, 3rd Viscount Palmerston becomes Prime Minister for the second time.
1861	14 December	Victoria's husband, Prince Albert, dies at the age of 42.
1863	10 January	The London Underground opens, the oldest underground railway network in the world.
1865	29 October	John Russell, 1st Earl Russell becomes Prime Minister for the second time.
1866	28 June	Edward Smith-Stanley, 14th Earl of Derby becomes Prime Minister for the third time.
1867	15 August	The Representation of the People Act 1867 doubles the franchise and the Dominion of Canada was created.
1868	27 February	Benjamin Disraeli becomes prime minister.
1868	29 May	The last public execution is carried out.
1868	3 December	William Ewart Gladstone becomes prime minister.
1869	1 April	The Runcorn Railway Bridge opens across the River Mersey, giving Liverpool a more direct railway route to London as part of the West Coast Main Line.
1870	17 February	The Elementary Education Act 1870 is passed, introducing universal education in England and Wales.
1872	6 August	The Education (Scotland) Act 1872 expands access to primary education and makes it compulsory in Scotland.
1874	20 February	Benjamin Disraeli becomes Prime Minister for the second time.
1880	23 April	William Ewart Gladstone becomes Prime Minister for the second time.
1880	26 August	The Elementary Education Act 1880 is passed, making primary schooling compulsory in England and Wales.
1885	23 June	Robert Gascoyne-Cecil, 3rd Marquess of Salisbury becomes prime minister.
1885	25 June	The Reform Act 1885 is passed.
1886	1 February	William Ewart Gladstone becomes Prime Minister for the third time.
1886	21 June	Construction begins on Tower Bridge in London.
1886	25 July	Robert Gascoyne-Cecil, 3rd Marquess of Salisbury becomes Prime Minister for the second time.
1887	November	The fictional detective Sherlock Holmes first appears in print.
1892	15 August	William Ewart Gladstone becomes Prime Minister for the fourth time.
1894	5 March	Archibald Primrose, 5th Earl of Rosebery becomes prime minister.
1895	25 June	Robert Gascoyne-Cecil, 3rd Marquess of Salisbury becomes Prime Minister for the third time.
1896	4 May	The Daily Mail is first published.

== 20th century ==
Year	Date	Event
1900	27 February	The Labour Party is founded.
1901	22 January	Queen Victoria dies and Edward VII ascends the throne.
1902	12 July	Arthur Balfour becomes prime minister.
1902	9 August	Coronation of Edward VII and Alexandra.
1902	31 May	Treaty of Vereeniging ends the Second Boer War.
1903	September	The Lib-Lab pact enables Labour to break into national politics.
1904	8 April	Entente Cordiale signed between Britain and France
1905	5 December	Henry Campbell-Bannerman becomes prime minister.
1908	5 April	H. H. Asquith becomes prime minister.
1908	27 April	The Summer Olympics open at White City in London.
1908	27 October	Parliament approves old age pensions.
1910	6 May	Edward VII dies and George V ascends the throne.
1911	22 June	Coronation of George V and Mary.
1912	13 April	Royal Flying Corps established.
1912	14 – 15 April	The RMS Titanic sinks after hitting an iceberg. Over 1500 crew and passengers die.
1914	4 August	World War I: Great Britain declares war on Germany in response to the invasion of Belgium.
1914	5 November	Britain declares war on the Ottoman Empire.
1916	6 December	David Lloyd George becomes prime minister.
1918	6 February	Women get the vote for the first time – women over the age of 30 who met a property qualification could vote as a result of the Representation of the People Act 1918.
1918	1 April	The Royal Air Force is founded, becoming the first independent air force in the world.
1918	11 November	World War I ends.
1919	1 December	Nancy Astor becomes the first woman to take her seat in parliament.
1921		The Great Britain road numbering scheme.
1922	18 October	The BBC is founded as the British Broadcasting Company.
1922	23 October	Bonar Law becomes prime minister.
1923	22 May	Stanley Baldwin becomes prime minister.
1924	22 January	Ramsay MacDonald becomes prime minister.
1924	4 November	Stanley Baldwin becomes Prime Minister for the second time.
1926	4 May – 12 May	The 1926 United Kingdom general strike takes place.
1928	2 July	Women receive the right to vote on the same terms as men (over the age of 21) as a result of the Representation of the People Act 1928.
1928	September	The first film with dialogue is shown in Britain, The Jazz Singer.
1928	30 September	Alexander Fleming discovers penicillin.
1929	5 June	Ramsay MacDonald becomes Prime Minister for the second time.
1931	?	The Dominion of Canada later has more recognition as Canada.
1934	30 November	The LNER Class A3 4472 Flying Scotsman built in Doncaster becomes the first steam locomotive to reach 100 mph (160 km/h).
1935	7 June	Stanley Baldwin becomes Prime Minister for the third time.
1936	20 January	George V dies and Edward VIII ascends the throne.
1936	5 – 31 October	The Jarrow March protest occurs.
1936	10 December	Edward VIII abdicates the throne over his proposal to marry American divorcee Wallis Simpson. Automatic accession of George VI.
1937	12 May	Coronation of George VI and Elizabeth.
1937	28 May	Neville Chamberlain becomes prime minister.
1937	30 June	First available in the London area, the 999 telephone number is introduced as the world's first emergency telephone service.
1938	3 July	The LNER Class A4 4468 Mallard built in Doncaster breaks the land speed record for the fastest steam locomotive, reaching 203 km/h (126 mph); the record still stands.
1939	3 September	British entry into World War II.
1940	10 May	Winston Churchill becomes prime minister.
1945	8 May	World War II ends in Europe.
1945	26 July	Clement Attlee becomes prime minister.
1945	24 October	Britain becomes a founding member of the United Nations.
1947	15 August	India gains independence from Britain.
1948	1 January	British Rail is established.
1948	5 July	The National Health Service is founded, bringing state-funded healthcare to all.
1948	29 July – 14 August	London hosts the 1948 Summer Olympics.
1948	14 November	Birth of Charles, Prince of Wales.
1950	15 August	Birth of Anne, Princess Royal.
1950	29 August	British troops arrive to support US forces in the Korean War.
1951	26 October	Sir Winston Churchill becomes Prime Minister for the second time.
1952	?	Autocode, regarded as the first compiled programming language, is developed by Alick Glennie.
1952	6 February	Death of George VI. Automatic accession of Elizabeth II.
1953	25 April	James Watson and Francis Crick publish their discovery of the structure of DNA.
1953	2 June	Coronation of Elizabeth II.
1954	6 May	Roger Bannister breaks the four-minute mile with a time of 3:59.4.
1955	6 April	Anthony Eden becomes prime minister.
1955	22 September	Commercial television starts with the first ITV broadcast.
1956	17 October	Britain opens its first nuclear power station, Calder Hall.
1956	29 October	The Suez Crisis begins.
1956	7 November	The Suez Crisis ends with an Egyptian political victory.
1957	10 January	Harold Macmillan becomes prime minister.
1958	5 December	The British motorway system opens with the M6 Preston bypass.
1960	19 February	Birth of Andrew Mountbatten-Windsor.
1961	1 July	Birth of Diana, Princess of Wales.
1963	27 March	The first report of the Beeching cuts – a railway restructuring plan – was published, The Reshaping of British Railways.
1963	19 October	Alec Douglas-Home becomes Prime Minister but lasts only 363 days.
1964	10 March	Birth of Prince Edward, Duke of Edinburgh.
1964	16 October	Harold Wilson becomes prime minister.
1965	24 January	Death of Sir Winston Churchill.
1965	8 November	The death penalty is abolished officially.
1967	27 July	The Sexual Offences Act 1967 legalises homosexuality between men over 21.
1967	27 October	The Abortion Act 1967 is passed, legalising abortion on certain grounds.
1969	2 March	Concorde, the world's first supersonic airliner, makes its maiden flight.
1970	19 June	Edward Heath becomes prime minister.
1971	15 February	Decimal Day; the United Kingdom introduces a decimalised currency.
1972	22 January	The United Kingdom signs the Treaty of Accession in a ceremony in Brussels which was attended by Prime Minister Edward Heath in preparedness for membership of the European Communities from 1 January 1973.
1973	1 January	The United Kingdom joins and becomes a member state of the European Communities.
1974	4 March	Harold Wilson becomes Prime Minister for the second time.
1975	5 June	The United Kingdom chooses to remain a member state of the European Communities in a non-binding referendum.
1976	5 April	James Callaghan becomes prime minister.
1976	September	Britain becomes the first major Western state to be forced to ask to borrow money from the International Monetary Fund.
1978	25 July	Louise Brown becomes the first human in history to be born via in vitro fertilisation.
1979	4 May	Margaret Thatcher becomes the first female prime minister.
1979	27 August	The IRA kill the Queen's cousin Lord Mountbatten.
1981	24 June	The Humber Bridge opens, the longest single-span bridge in the world.
1981	29 July	Wedding of Prince Charles and Lady Diana Spencer.
1982	21 June	Birth of Prince William of Wales.
1982	2 April – 14 June	The Falklands War is fought against Argentina, resulting in a British victory and the United Kingdom reclaiming the Falkland Islands.
1982	2 November	Channel 4 launches across most of England, Scotland and Northern Ireland.
1984–1985	6 March 1984 – 3 March 1985	The UK miners' strike takes place, a major strike and protest to prevent Margaret Thatcher's government from closing down the British coal mining industry.
1984	15 September	Birth of Prince Harry of Wales.
1986	25 December	The Christmas episode of the soap opera EastEnders becomes the most-watched programme in the United Kingdom with a viewing of 30.1 million.
1988	3 March	The Liberal Democrats are founded.
1989	12 March	Tim Berners-Lee invents the World Wide Web.
1990	28 November	John Major becomes prime minister.
1991	18 – 26 May	Helen Sharman becomes the first British person and the first European woman in space.
1994	6 May	The Channel Tunnel opens, the first physical connection between the United Kingdom and France.
1996	?	A sheep named Dolly becomes the first mammal to be cloned from an adult somatic cell.
1997	2 May	Tony Blair becomes prime minister.
1997	1 July	The United Kingdom hands Hong Kong back to China, marking the end of the British Empire.
1997	31 August	Diana, Princess of Wales, dies due to a traffic collision in Paris.
1999	6 May	First elections to the Scottish Parliament and Welsh Assembly take place which will now be responsible for aspects of Scotland and Wales's governance.
1999	2 December	The Good Friday Agreement comes into effect, two agreements intended to bring about the end of the Troubles in Northern Ireland.
1999	31 December	The Millennium Dome and London Eye are opened to mark the new millennium.

== 21st century ==
Year	Date	Event
2002	9 February	Princess Margaret dies.
2002	30 March	Queen Elizabeth The Queen Mother dies aged 101.
2003	20 March – 1 May	The United Kingdom, alongside the US, invades Iraq.
2005	9 April	Wedding of Prince Charles and Camilla Parker Bowles.
2007	27 June	Gordon Brown becomes prime minister.
2010	11 May	David Cameron becomes prime minister.
2011	29 April	Wedding of Prince William and Catherine Middleton.
2012	30 March	The Shard tops out in construction, becoming the tallest building in Western Europe.
2012	27 July – 12 August	London hosts the Olympic Games for the third time.
2013	17 July	Same-sex marriage is legalised in the United Kingdom.
2013	22 July	Birth of Prince George of Cambridge.
2014	18 September	The Scottish independence referendum takes place; Scotland decides to remain part of the United Kingdom.
2015	2 May	Birth of Princess Charlotte of Cambridge.
2015	9 September	Elizabeth II becomes the longest-reigning monarch in British history.
2015	15 December	Tim Peake becomes the first British ESA astronaut to board the International Space Station.
2016	23 June	The United Kingdom votes to leave the European Union.
2016	13 July	Theresa May becomes the second female prime minister.
2016	5 – 21 August	Great Britain ranks second on the 2016 Summer Olympics medal table with 27 Gold Medals, the best result since 1908.
2018	23 April	Birth of Prince Louis of Cambridge.
2018	19 May	Wedding of Prince Harry and Meghan Markle.
2019	15 January	The motion to approve the Brexit withdrawal agreement – otherwise known as the "meaningful vote" – was rejected 202–432. This was the largest defeat on a government motion in history.
2019	24 July	Theresa May formally tenders her resignation as prime minister to Elizabeth II, and is succeeded by Boris Johnson.
2020	31 January	The United Kingdom withdraws from the European Union.
2020	23 March – 2021	A national lockdown takes place due to the coronavirus pandemic. Freedom of movement is restricted and this becomes enforceable in law. Non-essential shops and services close.
2022	8 September	Elizabeth II dies aged 96, seven months after her Platinum Jubilee. Automatic accession of Charles III. Aged 73, he becomes the oldest person to accede to the throne.
2022	20 October	Liz Truss resigns as prime minister after 44 days, making her the shortest-serving prime minister in British history.
2022	25 October	Rishi Sunak becomes the first prime minister of Asian descent.
2023	6 May	Coronation of King Charles III and Queen Camilla.
2024	5 July	Keir Starmer becomes prime minister.
2026	20 July	Andy Burnham becomes prime minister.

== See also ==
- Timeline of Cornish history
- Timeline of English history
- Timeline of Irish history
- Timeline of Scottish history
- Timeline of Welsh history
