= 3rd century in Roman Britain =

Events from the 3rd century in Roman Britain.

== Events ==
- 206
  - Governor Lucius Alfenus Senecio repairs Hadrian's Wall and appeals for help from the Emperor against the northern tribes.
- 208
  - Emperor Septimius Severus and his son Caracalla take personal command of the army in Britain.
- 209
  - Severus and Caracalla lead an expedition against the Caledonii, and build forts at Cramond and the Tay estuary.
- 210
  - Caracalla leads an expedition against the rebellious Maeatae tribe.
- 211
  - 4 February – Severus dies at York, while preparing another expedition against the northern rebels.
  - Caracalla, now Emperor, abandons territory north of Hadrian's Wall, and returns to Rome.
- c. 214
  - Britain divided into two provinces, Britannia Superior and Britannia Inferior, with administrative centres at London and York respectively.
- c. 220
  - Saxons raid south-east coast; forts built at Reculver and Branodunum (Brancaster).
- 245
  - Many thousands of acres of modern-day Lincolnshire are inundated by a great flood.
- 255
  - Work begins on a riverside wall in London.
- 259
  - Rebel leader Latinus Postumus proclaims Britain as part of his "Empire of the Gauls".
- 270
  - Construction of forts along the Saxon Shore begins in response to increased raiding.
- 273
  - Stone walls built around St Albans.
- 274
  - Postumus's Gallic Empire is reabsorbed into the Roman Empire under Aurelian.
- 277
  - Imperial edict lifts restrictions on British wine production.
  - General Victorinus puts down revolt, and settles Burgundian and Vandal prisoners in Britain.
- Britannic Empire 286-296
  - 287
    - Mausaeus Carausius takes power in Britain and proclaims himself Emperor.
  - 289
    - Carausius defeats Emperor Maximian in a naval battle.
  - 293
    - Finance minister Allectus murders Carausius and seizes power; employs Frankish mercenaries.
  - 296
    - Constantius Chlorus and Julius Asclepiodotus defeat the Britons near Silchester, killing Allectus; prevents retreating Franks from sacking London.
- 297
  - Re-building of forts near Hadrian's Wall begins.
  - Constantius returns to Gaul.

== See also ==
- End of Roman rule in Britain
