= Hywel ab Ieuaf =

King of Gwynedd from 979 to 985

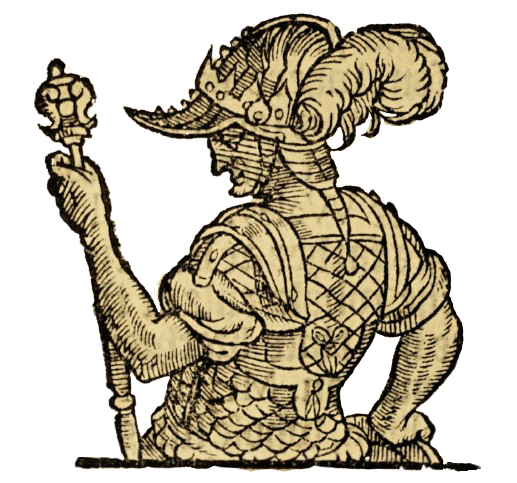
- A fanciful illustration of Hywel ab Ieuaf from the Historie of Cambria (1584)

King of Gwynedd
- Reign: c. 979 – 985
- Predecessor: Iago ab Idwal Foel
- Died: c. 985
- Father: Ieuaf

Hywel ab Ieuaf (died 985) was a King of Gwynedd in North West Wales from 979 to 985.

Hywel was the son of Ieuaf, who had ruled Gwynedd jointly with his brother Iago ab Idwal until 969. In that year the sons of Idwal quarrelled and Iago took Ieuaf prisoner. Hywel is first recorded as accompanying Iago to Chester to meet King Edgar of England in 973 when together with a number of other kings, including the kings of Scotland and of Strathclyde, he pledged that he would be the king's henchman on sea and land. Later chroniclers made the kings into eight, all plying the oars of Edgar's state barge on the River Dee.

In 974 Hywel raised an army and drove his uncle from Gwynedd temporarily. Iago was able to return but was forced to share power with his nephew. In 978 Hywel made another attempt to take the kingdom from his uncle, raiding the monastery at Clynnog Fawr. In this raid, Hywel was assisted by English troops, possibly provided by Ælfhere, Earl of Mercia. Hywel defeated Iago in battle in 979, and the same year Iago was captured by a force of Vikings, possibly in Hywel's pay, and vanished from the scene. Hywel was left as sole ruler of Gwynedd, but apparently did not set his father free, since according to John Edward Lloyd Ieuaf remained in captivity until 988.

In 980 Hywel faced a challenge from Iago's son, Custennin ab Iago, who attacked Anglesey in alliance with Gofraid mac Arailt, a Viking chief from the Isle of Man. Hywel defeated them in battle, killing Custennin and putting Gofraid and his men to flight. Now securely in possession of Gwynedd, Hywel aimed to expand his kingdom to the south. He again made an alliance with Ælfhere and attacked Brycheiniog and Morgannwg with some success, although he was not able to annex these kingdoms. However, in 985 his English allies turned on him and killed him, possibly alarmed by his growing power. He was succeeded by his brother Cadwallon ab Ieuaf, who had not been on the throne long when Gwynedd was annexed by Maredudd ab Owain of Deheubarth.

== Sources ==
- John Edward Lloyd (1911). A history of Wales: from the earliest times to the Edwardian conquest. Longmans, Green & Co.
- Kari Maund (2006). The Welsh kings: warriors, warlords and princes. Tempus. ISBN 0-7524-2973-6.
- Powel, David (1584). The historie of Cambria, now called Wales: a part of the most famous Yland of Brytaine, written in the Brytish language aboue two hundreth yeares past. Translated by Llwyd, Humphrey. London: Rafe Newberrie and Henrie Denham. IA historieofcambri00cara.

Preceded by Iago ab Idwal	King of Gwynedd; 979–985	Succeeded by Cadwallon ab Ieuaf
