= Llywelyn ap Seisyll =

King of Gwynedd from 1018 to 1023

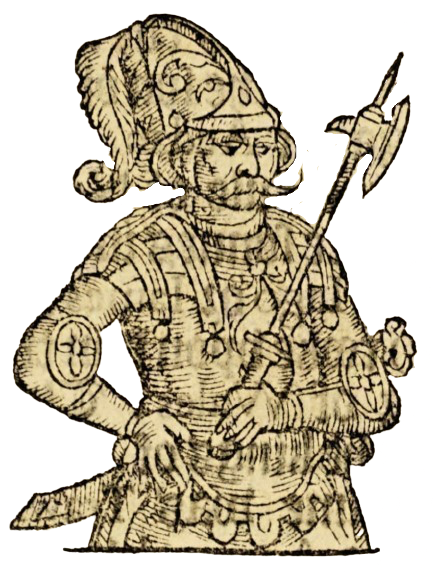
- A fanciful illustration of Llywelyn ap Seisyll from the Historie of Cambria (1584)

King of Powys and Deheubarth
- Reign: 999–1023
- Predecessor: Maredudd ab Owain
- Successor: Rhydderch ab Iestyn

King of Gwynedd
- Reign: 1018–1023
- Predecessor: Aeddan ap Blegywryd
- Successor: Iago ab Idwal ap Meurig
- Died: 1023
- Spouse: Angharad ferch Maredudd
- Issue: Gruffydd ap Llywelyn
- Father: Seisyll
- Mother: Prawst ferch Elisedd

Llywelyn ap Seisyll (died 1023) was a king of Gwynedd in the 11th century who ruled over the Welsh kingdoms of Gwynedd, Powys and Deheubarth.

== Biography ==
Llywelyn was the son of Seisyll, about whom little is known. Llywelyn's mother, Prawst, was the daughter of Elisedd, a younger son of Anarawd ap Rhodri, King of Gwynedd (d. 916). His paternal great grandparents were Angharad ferch Meurig and Rhodri Mawr (d. 878). Llywelyn was married to Angharad, daughter of Maredudd ab Owain ap Hywel Dda (d. c. 999), who ruled in Gwynedd, Deheubarth and Powys.

He first appears on the record in 1018, when he defeated and killed Aeddan ap Blegywryd and his four sons, subsequently obtaining control of Gwynedd and Powys.

In 1022, Rhain the Irishman, who claimed to be a son of Maredudd ab Owain and thereby asserted a claim to Deheubarth, was made its king. Rhain's claim was contested by Llywelyn, as Maredudd's daughter Angharad was Llywelyn's wife. A battle ensued at Abergwili in 1022, where after significant casualties on both sides, Rhain was killed and Llywelyn took control of Deheubarth.

According to the Brut y Tywysogion, Llywelyn's reign was prosperous, and he was dubbed "King of the Britons" by the Annals of Ulster. Llywelyn died in 1023, and despite his accomplishments, his son Gruffydd ap Llywelyn did not immediately succeed him, potentially due to his young age.

== Legacy ==
Gruffydd ap Llywelyn would eventually become the first and only ruler to govern the entirety of what is now known as Wales, although he was killed by his own men in 1063. His sons, Maredudd and Idwal, met their end in 1069, fighting at the Battle of Mechain.

== Sources ==
- Tout, Thomas Frederick (1901). "Llywelyn ab Seisyll" . In Lee, Sidney (ed.). Dictionary of National Biography. Vol. 34. London: Smith, Elder & Co. pp. 6–7.
- Pierce, Thomas Jones (1959). "LLYWELYN ap SEISYLL (died 1023), king of Deheubarth and Gwynedd". Dictionary of Welsh Biography. National Library of Wales.
- John Edward Lloyd (1911). A History of Wales: From the Earliest Times to the Edwardian Conquest. Longmans, Green & Co.
- Powel, David (1584). The historie of Cambria, now called Wales: a part of the most famous Yland of Brytaine, written in the Brytish language aboue two hundreth yeares past. Translated by Llwyd, Humphrey. London: Rafe Newberrie and Henrie Denham. IA historieofcambri00cara.
- "Llewelyn AP SEISYLL, King of Gwynedd & Dyfed". thesignsofthetimes.com.au.
- Darrell Wolcott. "THE ERA OF LLEWELYN AP SEISYLL". ancientwalesstudies.org.
- "Llywelyn ap Seisyll". oxfordreference.com.

Regnal titles
Preceded by Aeddan ap Blegywryd (Gwynedd); Maredudd ab Owain (Powys)	King of Gwynedd and King of Powys; 1018–1023	Succeeded by Iago ab Idwal ap Meurig
Preceded by Cadell ab Einion	King of Deheubarth; 1022–1023	Succeeded by Rhydderch ap Iestyn
