= Cynan ap Hywel =

King of Gwynedd from 999 to 1005

Hywel ab Ieuaf

King of Gwynedd
- Reign: c. 999 - 1005
- Predecessor: Maredudd ab Owain
- Died: c. 1005
- Father: Hywel ab Ieuaf

Cynan ap Hywel (ruled 999–1005) was a King of Gwynedd, one of the kingdoms or principalities of medieval Wales. He was the son of Hywel ab Ieuaf, a previous king from the line of Idwal Foel (his grandfather). On Hywel's death, the realm was ruled by his brother, but almost immediately was seized by Maredudd ab Owain.

After the death in 999 of Maredudd, the rule of Gwynedd returned to the original dynasty in the form of Cynan ap Hywel. Cynan reigned until 1005 but very little has been recorded about his reign, and nothing is known about the circumstances in which he was supplanted by Aeddan ap Blegywryd, who was apparently out of the direct line of succession.

== See also ==
- History of Wales

== Sources ==
- John Edward Lloyd (1911). A history of Wales: from the earliest times to the Edwardian conquest. Longmans, Green & Co.

Cynan ap Hywel House of Aberffraw Born: Unknown Died: 1005
Preceded by Maredudd ab Owain	King of Gwynedd; 999–1005	Succeeded by Aeddan ap Blegywryd
