= Maredudd ab Owain =

King of Gwynedd from 986 to 999

Maredudd ab Owain ap Hywel Dda
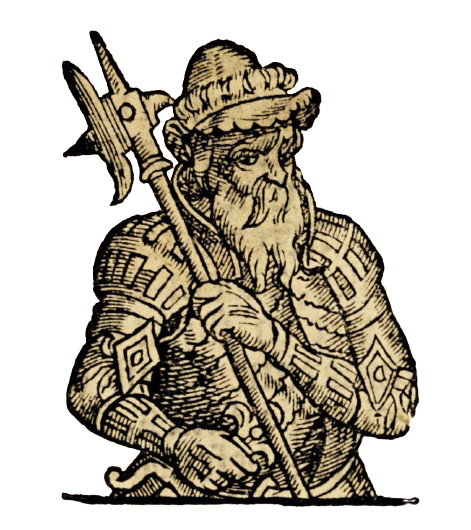
- A fanciful illustration of Maredudd ab Owain from the Historie of Cambria (1584)

King of Powys and Deheubarth
- Reign: 986–999
- Predecessor: Owain ap Hywel Dda
- Successor: Llywelyn ap Seisyll

King of Gwynedd
- Reign: 986–999
- Predecessor: Cadwallon ab Ieuaf
- Successor: Cynan ap Hywel
- Born: unknown
- Died: c. 999
- Issue: Angharad
- Dynasty: House of Dinefwr
- Father: Owain ap Hywel Dda

Maredudd ab Owain (died c. 999) was a Welsh monarch, ruling in Gwynedd, Deheubarth and Powys. A member of the House of Dinefwr, his patrimony was the kingdom of Deheubarth comprising the southern realms of Dyfed and Seisyllwg. Upon the death of his father King Owain ap Hywel Dda around 988, he also inherited the kingdoms of Gwynedd and Powys, which he had conquered for his father. He was counted among the Kings of the Britons by the Chronicle of the Princes.

Map of the extent of Maredudd ab Owain's Conquest Deheubarth, Maredudd ab Owain's principality Combine to form Morgannwg

Maredudd was the younger son of King Owain ap Hywel Dda of Deheubarth and the grandson of King Hywel Dda. Owain had inherited the kingdom through the early death of his brothers and Maredudd, too, came to the throne through the death of his elder brother Einion around 984. Around 986, Maredudd captured Gwynedd from its king Cadwallon ab Ieuaf. He may have controlled all Wales apart from Gwent and Morgannwg.

Maredudd is recorded as raiding Mercian settlements on the borders of Radnor and as paying a ransom of a silver penny a head to rescue some of his subjects who had been taken captive in Danish raids. Viking raids were a constant problem during Maredudd's reign. In 987, Godfrey Haroldson raided Anglesey, supposedly killing one thousand and carrying away another two thousand as captives; Maredudd was said to have then paid a huge ransom for the freedom of the hostages.

Following Maredudd's death around 999, the throne of Gwynedd was recovered for the line of Idwal Foel by Cynan ap Hywel. The throne of Deheubarth went to a man named Rhain who was accepted as Maredudd's son by its people but who – after the kingdom's conquest by Llywelyn ap Seisyll – was recorded by most Welsh histories as an Irish pretender and usurper. The kingdom was later restored to Maredudd's family, but through Hywel ab Edwin, the grandson of his brother Einion. Maredudd's daughter, Angharad, the wife of king Llywelyn ap Seisyll, was the mother of his son Gruffydd ap Llywelyn, King of Wales and would later become the mother of king Bleddyn ap Cynfyn, founder of the House of Mathrafal after Maredudd's death and her remarriage.

Maredudd ab Owain House of Dinefwr Born: Unknown Died: c. 999
Preceded by Cadwallon ab Ieuaf	King of Gwynedd; 986–999	Succeeded by Cynan ap Hywel
Preceded by Owain ap Hywel Dda	King of Deheubarth; 988–999	Succeeded by Rhain
