= Aeddan ap Blegywryd =

King of Gwynedd from 1005 to 1018

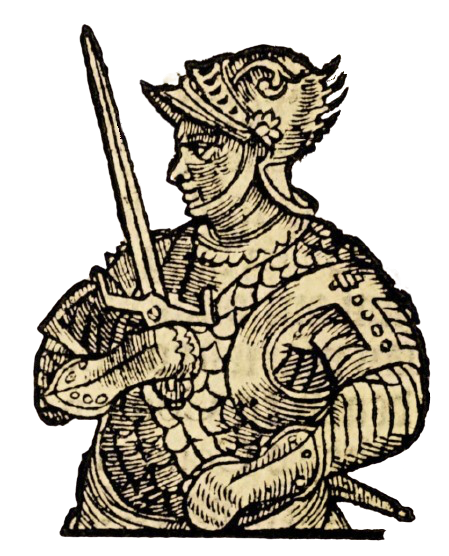
- A fanciful illustration of Aeddan ap Blegywryd from the Historie of Cambria (1584)

King of Gwynedd
- Reign: 1005–1018
- Predecessor: Cynan ap Hywel
- Successor: Llywelyn ap Seisyll
- Died: 1018
- Issue: 4 sons

Aeddan ap Blegywryd (died 1018) was a King of Gwynedd in medieval Wales. He became ruler in 1005 but the circumstances of his accession are unclear as he does not seem to have been closely related to his predecessor, Cynan ap Hywel. Aeddan ap Blegywryd was defeated in battle in 1018 and was killed, along with his four sons.

Idwal ap Meurig had been dispossessed of his lands in Gwynedd but recovered them in 993. However, in 1000, Aeddan ap Blegywryd wrested control of the whole of North Wales and Idwal's son, Iago, fled to Ireland.

At this time, Cynan ap Hywel was a King of Gwynedd, one of the kingdoms or principalities of medieval Wales, ruling from 999 to 1005. After he died in 1005, the throne of Gwynedd fell to Aeddan ap Blegywryd, who was apparently out of the direct line of succession. It is not known whether or not Aeddan seized the throne by force, but his lack of connection to the ruling family of Gwynedd suggests that he did. Around this time, Iago died in Ireland, but over a period of some years, his son Cynan was helped by Irish Danes to attempt to recover the principality of North Wales. In these efforts he was unsuccessful.

In 1018, Aeddan ap Blegywryd was challenged for leadership by Llywelyn ap Seisyll, whose ancestry is unknown. A battle took place and Aeddan ap Blegywryd was defeated, being killed along with four of his sons.

== Sources ==
- Powel, David (1584). The historie of Cambria, now called Wales: a part of the most famous Yland of Brytaine, written in the Brytish language aboue two hundreth yeares past. Translated by Llwyd, Humphrey. London: Rafe Newberrie and Henrie Denham. IA historieofcambri00cara.

Regnal titles
| Preceded by Cynan ap Hywel | Kingdom of Gwynedd; 1005–1018 | Succeeded by Llywelyn ap Seisyll |
