= Subdivisions of Wales =

Administrative and non-administrative areas of Wales

The subdivisions of Wales constitute a hierarchy of administrative divisions and non-administrative ceremonial areas.

For the purposes of local government, the country is divided into principal areas, of either counties or county boroughs, and communities. The current system is the result of incremental reform which has its origins in legislation enacted in 1972 and 1994.

== Administrative ==
=== Principal areas ===
There are 22 principal areas of Wales. They were established on 1 April 1996 by the Local Government (Wales) Act 1994 (1994 c. 19). Eleven are styled "counties", including the cities of Cardiff and Swansea, and eleven are styled "county boroughs", including the cities of Newport and Wrexham.

The location of each council headquarters is indicated by a yellow marker. County boroughs are marked by a dagger (†).

Blaenau Gwent †; Bridgend (Pen-y-bont ar Ogwr) †; Caerphilly (Caerffili) †; Cardiff (Caerdydd); Carmarthenshire (Sir Gaerfyrddin); Ceredigion; Conwy †; Denbighshire (Sir Ddinbych); Flintshire (Sir y Fflint); Gwynedd; Isle of Anglesey (Ynys Môn); Merthyr Tydfil (Merthyr Tudful) †; Monmouthshire (Sir Fynwy); Neath Port Talbot (Castell-nedd Port Talbot) †; Newport (Casnewydd) †; Pembrokeshire (Sir Benfro); Powys; Rhondda Cynon Taf †; Swansea (Abertawe); Torfaen (Tor-faen) †; Vale of Glamorgan (Bro Morgannwg) †; Wrexham (Wrecsam) †
Areas marked † are county boroughs, while unmarked areas are counties. Welsh-language forms are given alongside the English where they differ.

=== Name changes ===
Some of the principal areas use different names to those given in the Local Government (Wales) Act 1994. In each case the council renamed the area immediately, with the changes taking effect on 2 April 1996. The changes were:

- Conwy from "Aberconwy and Colwyn"
- Isle of Anglesey from "Anglesey"
- Gwynedd from "Caernarfonshire and Merionethshire"
- Ceredigion from "Cardiganshire"

Other smaller changes were also made, such as:

- Neath Port Talbot from "Neath and Port Talbot"

=== Communities ===
At the lowest level of administrative subdivision in Wales are the communities, into which each principal area is subdivided. They may have elected community councils which perform a number of roles, such as providing local facilities, and representing their communities to larger local government bodies. Community councils are the equivalent of English parish councils. A community council may call itself a "town council" if it so wishes. The councils of three communities with city status – Bangor, St Asaph, and St Davids – are known as "city councils". Communities which are too small to have a council may have a community meeting instead: an example of direct democracy. The communities in the urban areas of the cities of Cardiff, Swansea and Newport do not have community councils.

== Non-administrative ==
=== Preserved counties ===
For ceremonial purposes of Lieutenancy and Shrievalty, Wales is divided into eight preserved counties. These were based on the counties (created by the Local Government Act 1972) which were used for local government and other purposes between 1974 and 1996.

There are eight preserved counties:

- Clwyd
- Dyfed
- Mid Glamorgan
- South Glamorgan
- West Glamorgan
- Gwent
- Gwynedd
- Powys

== Historic ==
=== Historic counties ===
The historic counties of Wales are ancient subdivisions of Wales, used for various functions for several hundred years. Pembrokeshire was formed as a county palatine in 1138. In the south east, Norman advancement led to the creation of marcher lordships, such as Glamorgan, which served as semi-autonomous administrative divisions, although these were not counties in the true sense as they lacked the formal structure. Some towns within these areas did, however, receive charters which outlined rights and duties in much the same way as a borough. Counties in the strict sense first appeared with the establishment of Cardiganshire and Carmarthenshire in the 1240s. In 1284 the Principality of Gwynedd was divided into three counties: Anglesey, Caernarvonshire and Merionethshire. Before the end of the century, Flintshire had also become a county, and thus nearly half the territory of Wales was under the rule of the English Crown. While the arrangement did not officially bring the marcher lordships in the South directly under the King's control, many such lordships were held by the King personally, although some remained under the semi-autonomous control of powerful local families. The formation of counties was completed under the Laws in Wales Act 1535, which created Montgomeryshire, Denbighshire, Radnorshire, Brecknockshire and Monmouthshire, many from existing marcher lordships now recreated as counties proper.

These 13 counties were the main administrative subdivisions of Wales from 1536 until the implementation in 1974 of the Local Government Act 1972, although the definition and role of the smaller county boroughs within the counties during that period saw considerable change, as it did across the United Kingdom.

== Regions ==
=== Regional partnership areas ===
Map of the four CJCs in Wales: North Wales CJC Mid Wales CJC South West Wales CJC South East Wales CJC

Wales is subdivided into four regional areas for its Corporate Joint Committees and its conterminous regional economic growth deals. City deals have been agreed for the Cardiff Capital Region and Swansea Bay City Region, which cover south-east and south-west Wales respectively, and growth deals have been agreed for Mid Wales (Growing Mid Wales) and North Wales (Ambition North Wales). There are four equivalent CJCs which may oversee the deals, and they also cover Mid Wales, North Wales, South East Wales, and South West Wales. The CJC's were established by The Local Government and Elections (Wales) Act 2021. CJCs have powers relating to economic well-being, strategic planning and the development of regional transport policies.

== Other subdivisions ==
=== Service areas ===
==== Police services ====
There are four police forces in Wales: Dyfed-Powys Police, Gwent Police, North Wales Police and South Wales Police.

1. North Wales Police; 2. Dyfed-Powys Police; 3. South Wales Police; 4. Gwent Police

==== Fire and rescue services ====
There are three fire and rescue services in Wales, established in 1996: Mid and West Wales Fire and Rescue Service, North Wales Fire and Rescue Service and South Wales Fire and Rescue Service.

1. North Wales Fire and Rescue Service; 2. Mid and West Wales Fire and Rescue Service; 3. South Wales Fire and Rescue Service

==== Health boards ====
There are seven local health boards in Wales.

1. Betsi Cadwaladr University Health Board; 2. Powys Teaching Health Board; 3. Hywel Dda University Health Board; 4. Aneurin Bevan University Health Board; 5. Cwm Taf Morgannwg University Health Board; 6. Swansea Bay University Health Board; 7. Cardiff and Vale University Health Board

==== Trunk road agents ====
Trunk road agents are partnerships between two or more local authorities for the purposes of managing, maintaining, and improving the network of trunk roads (including any motorways) in their respective areas. Each trunk road agent can employ Welsh Government traffic officers. There are two agents, covering North and Mid Wales and South Wales.

basic	North and Mid Wales Trunk Road Agent South Wales Trunk Road Agent

=== International Territorial Level ===
Wales is divided into statistical regions by the UK's Office for National Statistics, using the International Territorial Level geocode standard since 2021. Before Brexit, as part of the European Union and Eurostat, the system used was Nomenclature of Territorial Units for Statistics (NUTS). Wales is a level 1 ITL region alongside Scotland, Northern Ireland and the 9 statistical regions of England, with the code "TLL". It is subdivided into two ITL 2 regions, which are themselves divided into twelve ITL 3 regions.

ITL 1	Code	ITL 2	Code	ITL 3	Code
Wales	TLL	West Wales and the Valleys	TLL1	Isle of Anglesey	TLL11
		West Wales and the Valleys	TLL1	Gwynedd	TLL12
		West Wales and the Valleys	TLL1	Conwy and Denbighshire	TLL13
		West Wales and the Valleys	TLL1	South West Wales (Ceredigion, Carmarthenshire, Pembrokeshire)	TLL14
		West Wales and the Valleys	TLL1	Central Valleys (Merthyr Tydfil, Rhondda Cynon Taff)	TLL15
		West Wales and the Valleys	TLL1	Gwent Valleys (Blaenau Gwent, Caerphilly, Torfaen)	TLL16
		West Wales and the Valleys	TLL1	Bridgend and Neath Port Talbot	TLL17
		West Wales and the Valleys	TLL1	Swansea	TLL18
		East Wales	TLL2	Monmouthshire and Newport	TLL21
		East Wales	TLL2	Cardiff and Vale of Glamorgan	TLL22
		East Wales	TLL2	Flintshire and Wrexham	TLL23
		East Wales	TLL2	Powys	TLL24

=== Electoral ===
Wales is divided into various electoral districts:

- UK Parliament constituencies in Wales
- Senedd constituencies and electoral regions
- List of electoral wards in Wales

== Settlement-based ==
=== Cities ===
There are seven cities in total in Wales: in addition to the four principal areas with city status (Cardiff, Swansea, Newport and Wrexham), the communities of Bangor, St Davids and St Asaph also have the status. City status is granted by letters patent.

- Bangor – time indeterminate
- Cardiff – 1905
- Swansea – 1969
- St Davids – 1994
- Newport – 2002
- St Asaph – 2012
- Wrexham – 2022

St Asaph, as the seat of a bishopric, was historically referred to as a city, and was described as such in the 1911 Encyclopædia Britannica. The status was, however, not officially recognised for many years. When city status was restored to St Davids in 1994, St Asaph town council submitted a petition for the same purpose. The petition was refused as, unlike St Davids, there was no evidence of any charter or letters patent in the past conferring the status. Applications for city status in competitions in 2000 and 2002 were unsuccessful. However, city status was finally granted to St Asaph in 2012 as part of the Queen's Diamond Jubilee celebrations: St Asaph was selected "to recognise its wealth of history, its cultural contribution and its metropolitan status as a centre for technology, commerce and business". Wrexham was awarded city status as part of the Queen's Platinum Jubilee in September 2022.

== See also ==
- Subdivisions of England
