= Mid and West Wales =

Region of Wales

Coordinates: 52.398°N 3.513°W

Common definition of Mid and (South) West Wales, containing the 6 Mid and South-western local authorities of Wales: Carmarthenshire, Ceredigion, Neath Port Talbot, Pembrokeshire, Powys, and Swansea. The two common definitions of Mid Wales and South West Wales.

Mid and West Wales or Mid and South West Wales is a geographic and statistical region of Wales that is sometimes used, consisting broadly of the preserved counties of Dyfed and Powys, sometimes Swansea and sometimes parts of Gwynedd. Since 2025, the Office for National Statistics for its International Territorial Level classification, has used a "Mid and South West Wales" ITL2 region comprising Mid Wales and South West Wales (with Neath Port Talbot and Swansea as separate ITL3 regions). It is also used sometimes as replacement for the regions of Mid Wales and South West Wales or West Wales in certain scenarios.

There is a Mid and West Wales Fire and Rescue Service and a Dyfed-Powys Police service.

There was also an electoral region for the Senedd with the same name, which was used, in parallel with the smaller constituencies, to elect top-up members under the Additional Member System from 1999 to 2026. A European Parliament constituency existed from 1979 until 1999.

== Other definitions of Mid and (South) West Wales ==
The area covered by Mid and West Wales Fire and Rescue Service

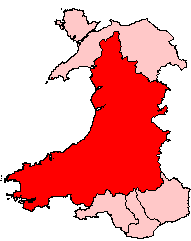
Former Mid and West Wales electoral region (1999–2007)

Mid and West Wales electoral region (2007-present)

The area covered by Dyfed-Powys Police Service

== See also ==
- Mid and West Wales Fire and Rescue Service
- United Kingdom general election results in Mid and West Wales
