= West Wales =

Geographical region of Wales

Coordinates: 52.434°N 4.275°W

A common definition of West Wales, covering Carmarthenshire, Ceredigion and Pembrokeshire; other definitions of the region exist

West Wales (Welsh: Gorllewin Cymru) is a region of Wales. There are several definitions on what comprises the region, including one historically comprised the Welsh principality of Deheubarth and another including Swansea and Neath Port Talbot, but excluding parts of South West Wales. The West Wales and the Valleys' NUTS (Note: This stands for Nomenclature of Territorial Units for Statistics. The acronym is derived from the French: Nomenclature des Unités Territoriales Statistiques.) area also includes more westerly parts of North Wales and the South Wales Valleys. The preserved county of Dyfed covers what is generally considered to be West Wales; between 1974 and 1996; it was a county, with a county council and six district councils.

== Definitions ==
There are several definitions of "West Wales":

- Pembrokeshire, Carmarthenshire and Ceredigion: this historically comprised the Welsh principality of Deheubarth This is also the area covered by the West Wales Regional Partnership Board, comprising councils, health sectors and NHS Wales, on matters relating to the area covered by Hywel Dda University Health Board.
- Pembrokeshire, Carmarthenshire, Neath Port Talbot and Swansea; this is used by Visit Wales, and covers a similar area as South West Wales, excluding Ceredigion.
- Pembrokeshire and Carmarthenshire (excluding Llanelli): this used by the Welsh Development Agency before the mid 1990s.
- Pembrokeshire, Carmarthenshire, Swansea, Neath Port Talbot and Bridgend County Borough: this has been used by the Welsh Development Agency from the mid-1990s.

There is also a West Wales and the Valleys NUTS (Note: Now the International Territorial Level.) statistical region. This includes South West Wales, Mid and West Wales or Mid and South West Wales, and North West Wales.

== Historic use ==
The term West Wales was applied to the Kingdom of Cornwall during the Anglo-Saxon invasion of Britain and the period of the Heptarchy. The Old English word Wealas, a Germanic term for inhabitants of the Western Roman Empire which the Anglo-Saxons came to apply especially to the Britons, gave its name to Wales and is also the origin of the second syllable in the name Cornwall.

== Main settlements ==
The main cities and towns commonly included in the term ‘'West Wales'’ are:

- Aberystwyth
- Carmarthen
- Llanelli
- St David’s

and sometimes:

- Neath
- Port Talbot
- Swansea.

== Railways ==
National Rail lines:

- Cambrian Line
- Heart of Wales Line
- West Wales Line.

Heritage railways:

- Gwili Railway
- Llanelli and Mynydd Mawr Railway
- Teifi Valley Railway
- Vale of Rheidol Railway.

== See also ==
- Geography of Wales
- Kingdom of Dyfed
- Mid Wales
- North Wales
- Principality of Deheubarth
- South Wales
- South West Wales
- Traws Link Cymru
- West Wales Raiders
- Little England beyond Wales.
