= Stevenson Leisure UK =

- Formerly: The Welsh Pub Company, Stevenson Leisure Wales
- Company type: Private company
- Industry: Hospitality industry
- Founded: 1992
- Defunct: 2015
- Fate: Acquired after financial decline
- Successor: Ravenscroft Leisure Holdings
- Area served: England and Wales

Stevenson Leisure UK was a British holding company that owned and managed various small organisations including cafés, public houses, hotels, and holiday homes. The company saw a significant decline in revenue starting in 2012 and was acquired in 2015.

Until 2014 the organisation also operated a chain of grocery/mini supermarket style stores however these were closed according to a statement from their management due to a "decline in the requirement of smaller stores in rural areas as online shopping is the favoured option of modern customers".

== History ==
Founded in 1992 as The Welsh Pub Company and grew after acquiring several public houses in the Pembrokeshire county of south west Wales. By 1994 a total of 16 public houses had been acquired and in 1996 the organisation began to expand into opening cafés and restaurants in many areas across Pembrokeshire.

In 2001 The Welsh Pub Company was purchased for £2.2 million by the American entrepreneur James D Marshal, who also paid the founders an estimated further £1.8m for all the real estate involved with the company. A new company was then founded as Stevenson Leisure Wales in 2001, following the purchase of £3 million worth of shares in Strategic Management and Public Relations UK, gaining them majority control over the company.

This was followed by a complete buyout in 2006 and merger of both Stevenson Leisure Wales and SMPR, the new organisation was named Stevenson Management and PR UK, later changed to Stevenson management after concerns the initialism SMPR was identical to the original initialism of the former name, Strategic Management and Public Relations. The organisation now continues to operate a number of small business across England.

In 2012 the organisation entered a dramatic financial decline and was forced to withdraw shares in a number of its majority interests, including the newly founded SunTEc sustainable energy in which Stevenson Management UK had invested a considerable sum. In January 2015 the organisation announced they had received and accepted an offer of £3.1 million from Ravenscroft Leisure Holdings involving a complete takeover of the company.
