= Corporate joint committee =

Local government body in Wales

Map of the four CJCs in Wales: North Wales CJC Mid Wales CJC South East Wales CJC South West Wales CJC

A corporate joint committee (CJC; Welsh: cyd-bwyllgorau corfforedig) is a type of local government institution introduced in Wales by the Local Government and Elections (Wales) Act 2021.

== History ==
The Local Government and Elections (Wales) Act 2021 became law in January 2021. It contained provisions to reduce the voting age from 18 to 16 for local elections in Wales and to extend the franchise to include eligible foreign nationals. It extended the term of local councillors from four years to five years. The law allows local councils to decide to continue to hold elections under first past the post system or to switch to the single transferable vote system.

The Local Government and Elections (Wales) Act 2021 created a framework for joint regional coordination between local authorities through the formation of corporate joint committees. Four corporate joint committees covering all of Wales, were established by statutory instruments in April 2021.

== Structure ==
Each committee is made up the leaders of the principal councils within its areas and chairs of national park authorities. They must appoint a chief executive, a finance officer and a monitoring officer. They are corporate bodies which can employ staff, hold assets and have dedicated budgets, just like any of its member councils.

== Powers ==
Corporate joint committees utilise powers already held by its member councils, such as:

- economic well-being
- strategic planning
- regional transport policy
- preparation of Strategic Development Plans
- preparation of Regional Transport Plans

The Government of the United Kingdom and the Welsh Government have considered devolving more powers to the committees.

== List of corporate joint committees ==
In April 2021, four corporate joint committees were created covering all of Wales:

Corporate joint committee	Map	Principal councils	URL
Mid Wales Corporate Joint Committee		Ceredigion; Powys	
North Wales Corporate Joint Committee		Anglesey; Conwy; Denbighshire; Flintshire; Gwynedd; Wrexham	
South East Wales Corporate Joint Committee		Blaenau Gwent; Bridgend; Caerphilly; Cardiff; Merthyr Tydfil; Monmouthshire; Newport; Rhondda Cynon Taf; Torfaen; Vale of Glamorgan	
South West Wales Corporate Joint Committee		Carmarthenshire; Neath Port Talbot; Pembrokeshire; Swansea	

== See also ==
- Local government in Wales
- Regions of Wales
- Regional economy in Wales
- History of local government in Wales
- Trunk road agent
- Partnership Council for Wales, a body which brings together Welsh ministers and council leaders
- Strategic authority, devolved authorities in England
- Strategic development planning authority - now-defunct equivalent bodies in Scotland
