= South East Wales =

Region of Wales

Coordinates: 51.541°N 3.070°W

Map of a common definition of South East Wales, made up of ten local authorities.

South East Wales is a geographic and statistical region of Wales generally corresponding to the preserved counties of Mid Glamorgan, South Glamorgan and Gwent. Highly urbanised, it includes the cities of Cardiff and Newport as well as large towns in the South Wales Valleys.

Since 2025, the Office for National Statistics for its International Territorial Level classification, has used a "South East Wales" ITL2 region comprising the ten counties.

== Usage and definition ==
The term South East Wales is used by the Welsh Government.

In the Wales Spatial Plan, South East Wales is defined for statistical purposes as comprising the local authorities of Vale of Glamorgan, Rhondda Cynon Taf, Merthyr Tydfil, Caerphilly, Cardiff, Newport, Blaenau Gwent, Torfaen, Monmouthshire and Bridgend (i.e. the preserved counties of Mid Glamorgan, South Glamorgan and Gwent). This area has a population of about 1,430,000 (2007 estimate), just under half the total population of Wales.

The South East Wales Biodiversity Records Centre definition of South East Wales includes the whole of the ancient counties of Glamorgan and Monmouthshire, an area which has a population of approximately 2 million (2007 estimate).

The Wales Spatial Plan, a national planning policy document revised in 2008, states that the area "largely had a hand and fingers pattern of urban development over the last 150 years, reflecting its major role in the industrial revolution and the rapid expansion of the iron, coal and steel industries initially in the Heads of the Valleys, then within the South Wales Valleys, then on the coastal plain."

The promotion of tourism in South East Wales is the responsibility of Capital Region Tourism, one of four regional tourism partnerships across Wales.

In March 2017, ten local authorities in the region formed the Cardiff Capital Region, following the ratification of a regional city deal.

In April 2021, a South West Wales Corporate Joint Committee was formed to allow the ten local councils in the region to collaborate in areas relating to economic well-being, strategic planning and the development of regional transport policies.

Since 2025, the Office for National Statistics for its International Territorial Level classification, has used a "North Wales" ITL2 region comprising the ten counties, or specifically the four ITL3 regions of Central Valleys and Bridgend, Gwent Valleys, Monmouthshire and Newport, and Cardiff and Vale of Glamorgan.

== Principal areas ==
The population, density and areas are estimates for 2024 from the Office for National Statistics.

Principal area	Created	Population	Density (/km^{2})	Area (km^{2})	Style
Cardiff	1996 (Note: re-instated as a principal administrative authority after a gap)	383,919	2,724	141	City and county
Rhondda Cynon Taf	1996	242,844	573	424	County borough
Caerphilly	1996	176,865	638	277	County borough
Newport	1996	167,899	882	190	County borough/City
Bridgend	1996	147,530	588	251	County borough
Vale of Glamorgan	1996	135,743	410	331	County borough
Monmouthshire	1996	94,930	112	849	County
Torfaen	1996	94,119	749	126	County borough
Blaenau Gwent	1996	67,873	624	109	County borough
Merthyr Tydfil	1996	58,972	529	111	County borough
South East Wales	2017	1,570,694	559	2,810	Region

== Transport ==
The M4 motorway runs through the region, connecting it with South Wales and London. The A470 road connects Cardiff on the south coast to Llandudno on the north coast.

Mainline rail services run through South East Wales on the South Wales Main Line towards Bristol and London. Other national rail services run from Cardiff and Newport to Birmingham and Nottingham on the Gloucester to Newport Line and to Manchester on the Welsh Marches Line. An urban rail network centred on Cardiff operates in the region and is known as Valley Lines.

Cardiff Airport is the only international airport in Wales.

== See also ==
- South Wales
- South Wales Valleys
- South West Wales
- North East Wales
