= Local government in Wales =

System of state administration on a local level in Wales

Local government in Wales is primarily undertaken by the twenty-two principal councils, who govern their respective principal area (county or county borough). The councils are unitary authorities, meaning they are responsible for providing local government services within their principal area, including education, social work, environmental protection, and most highway maintenance. The principal areas are divided into communities, most of which have an elected community council. The services provided by community councils vary, but they will typically maintain public spaces and facilities. Local councils in Wales are elected; the most recent local elections in Wales took place in 2022, and the next are due to take place in 2027.

== Governance ==
Local government is generally supervised by the (devolved) Welsh Ministers, who allocate funding of the majority of local government yearly revenue and capital settlements. The Government of Wales Act 2006 gave the Welsh Ministers the responsibility of setting up a scheme on how they are to propose and exercise their functions for the promotion and sustainability of Welsh local government.

=== Principal councils ===
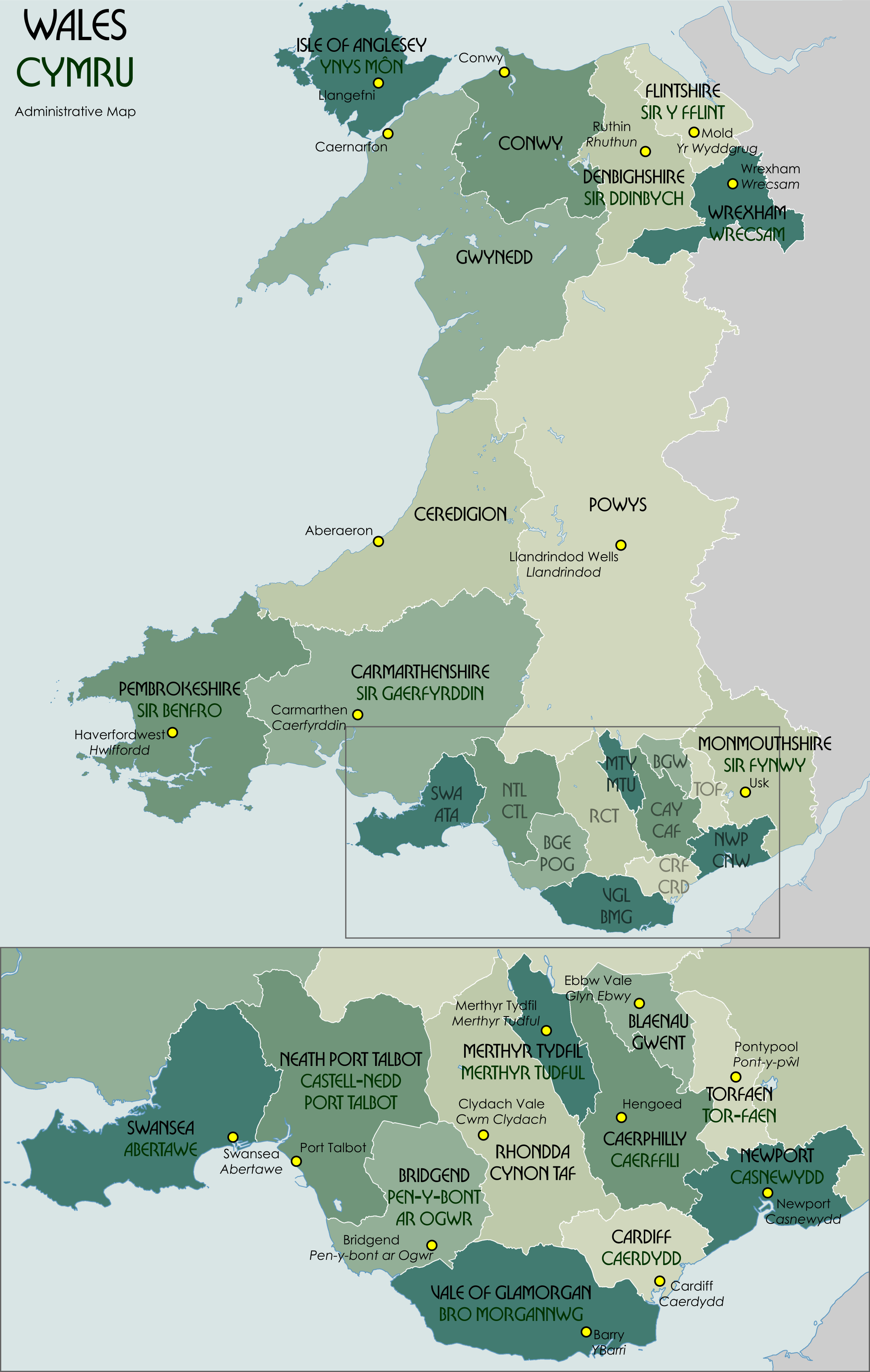
The principal areas of Wales

Like councils throughout the UK, Welsh councils are composed of elected councillors and local government elections normally take place every four years. The Wales Act 2017 prevents local government elections from taking place in the same year as elections to the Senedd, meaning the May 2021 local elections were postponed to May 2022. There are currently 22 principal areas (styled as a county or a county borough) in Wales, with the current configuration established in the Local Government (Wales) Act 1994, enacted on 1 April 1996, while the framework was established earlier in the Local Government Act 1972. Like community councils, they are composed of councillors.

Councils are required by law to hold annual general meetings, including after their election. In this meeting the council's chair or presiding member would be elected. Some councils also elect an individual to perform civic and ceremonial duties, usually known as a mayor and deputy mayor, with some styled as lord mayor.

Council decisions may be taken by the entire council, some legally defined committees (e.g. scrutiny, audit, licensing, planning and governance committees), or by the council's executive, largely made up of a majority of councillors. All principal councils in Wales have an executive leader and cabinet, although directly elected mayor model can be adopted by a council if there is public support through a referendum. Some decisions are required by law to be voted on by the entire council, such as the council budget and the amount of council tax. Most committees must be "politically balanced", proportionally representative of the council's political make up. Councils in Wales cannot operate a "committee system" as done in England.

All principal councils have to prepare and agree on a council constitution by law. It would also have to be kept up to date, published electronically, and revised when amended.

==== Responsibilities ====
The principal councils of Wales, have responsibility and deliver over 700 local government services. These include:

- Education – e.g. School transport and adult learning
- Housing – e.g. Provide accommodation for people in need and maintain social housing
- Social Care/Services – e.g. to protect and care for children, disabled and elderly people
- Highways and Transport – maintain local roads and manage traffic flow
- Waste Management – Waste collection and recycling
- Leisure and Cultural Services – e.g. libraries, leisure services and arts venues
- Consumer Protection – enforce trading standards and licensing taxis
- Environmental Health and Services – e.g. monitoring food safety in local pubs and restaurants, control local pollution
- Planning – manage local development and building safety
- Economic Development – attract new businesses and encourage tourism
- Emergency Planning – e.g. for floods or terrorist attacks

==== List of principal councils ====
The 22 principal councils of Wales are:

- Blaenau Gwent County Borough Council
- Bridgend County Borough Council
- Caerphilly County Borough Council
- Cardiff Council
- Carmarthenshire County Council
- Ceredigion County Council
- Conwy County Borough Council
- Denbighshire County Council
- Flintshire County Council
- Gwynedd Council
- Isle of Anglesey County Council
- Merthyr Tydfil County Borough Council
- Monmouthshire County Council
- Neath Port Talbot County Borough Council
- Newport City Council
- Pembrokeshire County Council
- Powys County Council
- Rhondda Cynon Taf County Borough Council
- City and County of Swansea Council
- Torfaen County Borough Council
- Vale of Glamorgan Council
- Wrexham County Borough Council

=== Community councils ===
At the lowest level of administrative subdivision in Wales are the communities, into which each principal area is subdivided. They may have elected community councils which perform a number of roles, such as providing local facilities, and representing their communities to larger local government bodies. Community councils are the equivalent of English parish councils. A community council may call itself a "town council" if it so wishes. The councils of three communities with city status – Bangor, St Asaph, and St Davids – are known as "city councils". Communities which are too small to have a council may have a community meeting instead: an example of direct democracy. The communities in the urban areas of the cities of Cardiff, Swansea and Newport do not have community councils.

Every part of Wales is covered by a community. There are 878 communities in Wales, however only 734 communities have a community council (also styled as a "town council" for some communities). The current configuration of communities was established in the Local Government (Wales) Act 1994, while the framework was established earlier in the Local Government Act 1972. Like principal councils, they are made up of councillors.

Before 1974, Wales had civil parishes, like in England, until they were replaced with communities. The communities initially followed the boundaries of the civil parishes they replaced.

=== Elections ===
Council elections in Wales are held every five years. Councils are not allowed to have more regular elections where a third of their members are elected instead. By-elections can occur for councils if a seat is made vacant, such as following resignation, however by-elections cannot be held within 6 months of a council-wide election.

Each council, both principal and community, are divided into electoral wards, which are decided by the Local Democracy and Boundary Commission for Wales. Some wards may be represented by more than one member, and therefore are called "multi-member" wards.

Councils can choose between running their elections with the first-past-the-post voting (FPTP) system or the single transferable vote (STV) system. First-past-the-post has been used as the sole voting system to elect councils in Wales since their establishment in the late 19th century.

Anyone over 16 and a legal resident of Wales can vote in local government elections, when registered to vote.

==== Electoral wards ====
The principal council areas' boundaries are made from a collection of electoral wards. Each unitary authority has roughly 40 electoral wards within them on average. There are 762 electoral wards in Wales.

As of 2021, the average resident population in an electoral ward in Wales was around 4 000. More populated wards are usually in larger urban areas. If boundary changes are made to electoral wards they are usually enacted on the first Thursday in May each year, in line with local government elections.

== Other local government ==
=== Fire and rescue authorities ===
Three fire and rescue authorities were established in Wales in 1996: Mid and West Wales Fire Authority, North Wales Fire Authority and South Wales Fire Authority. These are considered to be "local government" by the Welsh Government.

The fire authorities' powers and duties were set out in the Fire and Rescue Services Act 2004 (Part 2). Their core responsibilities are:

- promoting fire safety
- fire-fighting
- road traffic accident response
- handling other prescribed emergencies

Map of the fire authority areas of Wales
1. North Wales Fire Authority; 2. Mid and West Wales Fire Authority; 3. South Wales Fire Authority

=== National park authorities ===
There are three national park authorities in Wales, covering the country's three national parks. They are Bannau Brycheiniog National Park Authority (Brecon Beacons), Eryri National Park Authority (Snowdonia) and Pembrokeshire Coast National Park Authority. These are considered to be "local government" by the Welsh Government.

The national park authorities' responsibilities are:

- conserving and enhancing the cultural heritage, local wildlife and natural beauty of their respective national parks.
- the promotion of opportunities that allow for increased public enjoyment and understanding of the national parks' special qualities.

Map of the national park authority areas of Wales
1. Eryri National Park Authority (Snowdonia); 2. Bannau Brycheiniog National Park Authority (Brecon Beacons); 3. Pembrokeshire Coast National Park Authority

== Regional governance ==
There are various forms of strategic partnerships covering regions of Wales, which bring together members of various public services. These include members of the principal councils, national park authorities, fire authorities, health boards, and town and community councils. As well as Corporate Joint Committees.

=== Corporate Joint Committees ===
Map of the four CJCs in Wales: North Wales CJC Mid Wales CJC South East Wales CJC South West Wales CJC

The Local Government and Elections (Wales) Act 2021 allowed for the formation of corporate joint committees (CJCs) made up of two or more principal areas. CJCs have powers relating to economic well-being, strategic planning and the development of regional transport policies. There are four CJCs, covering Mid Wales, North Wales, South East Wales, and South West Wales. These are considered to be "local government" by the Welsh Government.

The joint committee's areas are conterminous with the partnership economic areas established by the same councils as part of city deals and growth deals, which they were later given the responsibility to oversee. City deals have been agreed for the Cardiff Capital Region and Swansea Bay City Region, which cover south-east and south-west Wales respectively, and growth deals have been agreed for Mid Wales (Growing Mid Wales) and North Wales (Ambition North Wales).

In Wales, there are various strategic partnerships comprising members of multiple public services, such as local authorities, health board, fire and rescue authorities, national park authorities, and town and community councils.

=== Other regional bodies ===
Other regional partnerships include regional economic boards (for city/growth deals or Ambition boards), Regional Partnership Boards, Adults' and Children's Safeguarding Partnerships, Community Safety Partnerships, Public Service Boards, Regional Housing Support Collaborative Groups and Area Planning Boards (relating to substance misuse).

==== Public Service Boards ====
A public service board (PSB) is a statutory board established in each principal area, as part of the Well-being of Future Generations (Wales) Act 2015. However, some PSB have merged to span multiple principal areas. Their main purpose is to improve the collaboration across the public services in a principal area.

There are four members of each board that are required by law, being members from the local authority, local health board, Natural Resources Wales and the fire and rescue authority. The board can statutory invite other public representatives such as the Police and crime commissioner, a force's chief constable, probation services or a voluntary sector representative.

There are currently fifteen public service boards, of varying overlapping degrees of integration, in Wales, they are:

- Gwent PSB (merged PSB; of also the following individual PSBs)
  - Blaenau Gwent PSB
  - Caerphilly PSB
  - Monmouthshire PSB
  - Newport PSB
  - Torfaen PSB
- Cwm Taf PSB
  - Rhondda Cynon Taf PSB
  - Merthyr Tydfil PSB
- Conwy and Denbighshire PSB
  - Conwy PSB
  - Denbighshire PSB
- Anglesey and Gwynedd (PSB collaboration on well-being plans)
  - Anglesey PSB
  - Gwynedd PSB

=== Regional Partnership Boards ===
Regional Partnership Boards (RPBs) were established by the Social Services and Well-being (Wales) Act 2014. They are made up of members of health boards, local authorities and the third sector. This can include a member of the local health board, a carer, a member of the public, a registered social landlord, a third-sector worker for a local authority or health board, and members of the local authority, such as one elected member, the Director of Social Services, a housing representative and an education representative. Their responsibilities are to produce regional population assessments and a regional area plan, provide a regional annual report and demonstrate how citizens have engaged and co-produced in the plans.

There are seven RPBs:

- Cardiff and Vale RPB
- Cwm Taf Morgannwg RPB
- Gwent RPB
- West Wales RPB
- North Wales RPB
- West Glamorgan RPB
- Powys RPB

=== Trunk road agents ===
Trunk road agents are partnerships between two or more local authorities for the purposes of managing, maintaining, and improving the network of trunk roads (including any motorways) in their respective areas. Each trunk road agent can employ Welsh Government traffic officers. There are two agents, covering North and Mid Wales and South Wales.

== Collaborative bodies ==
=== Partnership Council for Wales ===
The Partnership Council for Wales (PCfW), (Welsh: Cyngor Partneriaeth Cymru), was established under the Government of Wales Act 2006 (section 72) and encourages co-operation between the Welsh Government and local governments. The council's membership includes Welsh Government cabinet members, such as the first minister, and local government leaders, such as the leaders of principal, community, and town councils, and other public service representatives. Their meetings have representatives from organisations such as Wales TUC, Wales Council for Voluntary Action and other partners, as observers, like the Auditor General for Wales. The PCfW is responsible to encourage collaboration and dialogue on local government matters, and provide collective political accountability than can improve the outcomes for citizens.

=== Other ===
- Democracy and Boundary Commission Cymru – Responsible for the amount of electoral wards in each principal area, and the amount of councillors which are to represent each ward.

== History ==
Modern local government in Wales emerged during the late 19th century, when administrative counties and county boroughs were established in 1889. Urban and rural districts were formed in 1894. These were replaced in 1974 by eight two-tier counties and thirty-seven districts, which were in turn replaced by the present principal areas in 1996.

=== Reform proposals ===
==== Williams Commission ====
In April 2013, it was announced that a major review was to be undertaken into local government organisation in Wales, with a Commission on Public Service Governance and Delivery being established, to be chaired by Sir Paul Williams. First Minister Carwyn Jones said: "Since public sector budgets are likely to continue to tighten, and demand pressures grow, there is a clear need to examine how services can be sustained and standards of performance raised, so that people in Wales can continue to receive and influence the public services they need and value."

The Commission reported on 20 January 2014. It recommended that the number of councils be reduced, through mergers rather than through boundary changes, from 22 to 10, 11 or 12; and suggested that the cost of merging the councils would be met through savings made within about two years.

Carwyn Jones, first minister of Wales, stated that the report "addresses many [of the] issues [...] [as] the need for public services is outstripping the resources available to provide them", and that he's "always been clear that the status quo is not an option" and that change is essential and has to be done "so that our public services can become more efficient, effective, accessible and responsive".

Janet Finch-Saunders AM, shadow minister for local government, said "What matters to the vast majority of hardworking families is not the intricate structures of local government, but knowing that services will be delivered in an efficient and cost effective way [...] We believe that public services are best delivered locally so taxpayers can hold local representatives to account".

Rhodri Glyn Thomas, for Plaid Cymru, commented that evidence provided to the Williams Commission "show[ed] that if the people of Wales are going to get the services they need and deserve then there has to be a radical improvement in [delivery of] public services".

==== Draft Local Government (Wales) Bill ====
In response to recommendations made by the Williams Commission, the Welsh Government published a draft local government bill in November 2015. The draft bill contained two proposals, one for eight local authorities and one for nine local authorities. The difference between the two proposals is related to North Wales (two or three local authorities). The bill did not propose names for the local authorities, only listing them by number as a combination of existing principal areas. Powys was not affected by either proposal. The changes were planned to take effect in April 2020.

===== Eight local authorities model =====
Proposed 8 local authorities model

Proposed local authority	Proposed area
Area 1	Anglesey, Gwynedd, Conwy
Area 2	Denbighshire, Flintshire, Wrexham
Area 3	Ceredigion, Pembrokeshire, Carmarthenshire
Area 4	Swansea, Neath Port Talbot
Area 5	Bridgend, Rhondda Cynon Taff, Merthyr Tydfil
Area 6	Cardiff, Vale of Glamorgan
Area 7	Monmouthshire, Blaenau Gwent, Caerphilly, Torfaen and Newport
Powys	Powys

===== Nine local authorities model =====
Proposed 9 local authorities model

Proposed local authority	Proposed area
Area 1	Anglesey, Gwynedd
Area 2	Conwy, Denbighshire
Area 3	Flintshire, Wrexham
Area 4	Ceredigion, Pembrokeshire, Carmarthenshire
Area 5	Swansea, Neath Port Talbot
Area 6	Bridgend, Rhondda Cynon Taff, Merthyr Tydfil
Area 7	Cardiff, Vale of Glamorgan
Area 8	Monmouthshire, Blaenau Gwent, Caerphilly, Torfaen and Newport
Powys	Powys

==== 2016 redrafting and abandonment ====
Following the 2016 assembly elections, Carwyn Jones, first minister of Wales, announced that the proposals for local government reform would be taken "back to the drawing board" and that a new consensus on how to reform local government in Wales would be sought. The merger plans were formally dropped in January 2017, when the Welsh Government instead began a consultation on wider reform of local governance arrangements. The number of councils are to remain as they currently are, unless two or more local authorities wish to pursue a voluntary merger.

==== 2017 white paper ====
A white paper titled "Reforming Local Government: Resilient and Renewed" was published in January 2017. It proposed the formation of regional bodies to encourage better collaboration between existing local authorities and a possible change in the electoral system used in local elections from "first past the post" to the "Single transferable vote" system.

==== 2018 green paper ====
A new green paper, "Strengthening Local Government: Delivering for People", was published in 2018. The paper makes the case for a reduction of the number of local authorities from 22 to 10 and suggested three possible approaches, a system of voluntary mergers, a phased approach with authorities merging in either 2022 or 2026 or a comprehensive system of mergers to occur in 2022.

Proposed 10 authority model

Proposed local authority	Proposed area
Area 1	Anglesey, Gwynedd
Area 2	Conwy, Denbighshire
Area 3	Flintshire, Wrexham
Area 4	Powys
Area 5	Ceredigion, Pembrokeshire, Carmarthenshire
Area 6	Swansea, Neath Port Talbot
Area 7	Bridgend, Rhondda Cynon Taff, Merthyr Tydfil
Area 8	Cardiff, Vale of Glamorgan
Area 9	Caerphilly, Newport
Area 10	Blaenau Gwent, Monmouthshire, Torfaen

==== Local Government and Elections (Wales) Act 2021 ====
A bill was introduced by the Welsh Government in November 2019 to reform local government in Wales. The bill contains provisions to reduce the voting age from 18 to 16 for local elections in Wales and will extend the franchise to include eligible foreign nationals. It extends the term of local councillors from four years to five years. The bill will allow local councils to decide to continue to hold elections under first past the post system or to switch to the single transferable vote system. The bill does not include provisions to restructure local councils but does contain mechanisms that can allow for two or more authorities to merge on a voluntary basis. It also creates a framework for joint regional coordination between local authorities through the formation of "Corporate Joint Committees". The bill received Royal Assent in January 2021 and four Corporate Joint Committees covering all of Wales, were established the following month by statutory instruments.

== Mayors ==
There are some mayors in Wales, however they are ceremonial posts with no governing role.

=== Directly-elected mayors ===
Principal councils in Wales can consider introducing a directly-elected mayor, like those in England. However, no Welsh council has introduced the role, with Ceredigion voters rejecting the idea in a 2004 referendum. For a council to adopt the model, either the public in the local authority's area must start a petition, which then must pass a threshold to trigger a local referendum, or the council announces it wishes to adopt such a system, but must call a referendum to approve such system. If such a referendum passes in favour of a directly-elected mayor, then a subsequent election is held to elect such mayor, who would then create a cabinet in the council. A directly-elected mayor is an additional member to the existing number of councillors usually elected in local elections.

== See also ==
- List of political parties in Wales
- List of Welsh principal areas
- List of Welsh areas by percentage of Welsh-speakers
- Welsh Government
- Geography of Wales
- List of communities in Wales
- List of electoral wards in Wales
- ISO 3166-2:GB, subdivision codes for the United Kingdom
- Local government in England
- Local government in Northern Ireland
- Local government in Scotland
- Political make-up of local councils in the United Kingdom#Wales
- Regions of Wales
