= South East Wales Corporate Joint Committee =

Local government institution in Wales

South East Wales Corporate Joint Committee Cyd-bwyllgor Corfforedig De-ddwyrain Cymru (Welsh)
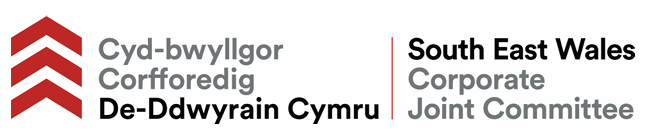

- Area covered by the South East Wales Corporate Joint Committee

Type
- Type: Corporate Joint Committee of South East Wales

History
- Founded: 1 April 2021

Leadership
- Chair: Mary Ann Brocklesby

Elections
- Voting system: Indirect election

Meeting place
- Sbarc-Spark, Maindy Road, Cardiff, CF24 4HQ

Website
- South East Wales CJC

The South East Wales Corporate Joint Committee (Welsh: Cyd-bwyllgor Corfforedig De-ddwyrain Cymru) is the Corporate Joint Committee for South East Wales that was established in April 2021 by statutory instruments made under the Local Government and Elections (Wales) Act 2021. It is an indirectly elected body made up of leaders of principal councils and national park authorities in the region.

== Powers ==
Corporate Joint Committees have powers relating to economic well-being, strategic planning and the development of regional transport policies. They are corporate bodies which can employ staff, hold assets and have dedicated budgets.

== Principal areas ==
The South East Wales Corporate Joint Committee covers the ten principal areas of Vale of Glamorgan, Rhondda Cynon Taf, Merthyr Tydfil, Caerphilly, Cardiff, Newport, Blaenau Gwent, Torfaen, Monmouthshire and Bridgend. The CJC's area is coterminous with that of the Cardiff Capital Region.

== Members ==
South East Wales Corporate Joint Committee is an indirectly elected body made up of the leaders of the principal councils and national park authorities in the region. By law, CJCs must appoint a chief executive, a finance officer and a monitoring officer.

As of May 2026, the membership of the committee is as follows:

Name	Position within nominating authority	Nominating authority
Steve Thomas	Leader of the Council	Blaenau Gwent County Borough Council
John Spanswick	Leader of the Council	Bridgend County Borough Council
Jamie Pritchard	Leader of the Council	Caerphilly County Borough Council
Chris Weaver	Leader of the Council	Cardiff Council
Brent Carter	Leader of the Council	Merthyr Tydfil County Borough Council
Mary Ann Brocklesby	Leader of the Council	Monmouthshire County Council
Dimitri Batrouni	Leader of the Council	Newport City Council
Andrew Morgan	Leader of the Council	Rhondda Cynon Taf County Borough Council
Anthony Hunt	Leader of the Council	Torfaen County Borough Council
Lis Burnett	Leader of the Council	Vale of Glamorgan Council
Julian Steadman	Chair of Planning	Bannau Brycheiniog National Park Authority

== See also ==
- Cardiff Capital Region
- South Wales Trunk Road Agent
