= Partnership Council for Wales =

Welsh local government body

- Cyngor Partneriaeth Cymru
- Predecessor: Council for Wales and Monmouthshire
- Formation: 25 July 2006
- Purpose: Local government representation
- Origins: Government of Wales Act 2006
- Region served: Wales
- Chair: Siân Gwenllian; Minister for Local Government
- Website: https://www.gov.wales/partnership-council-wales

The Partnership Council for Wales (PCfW; Welsh: Cyngor Partneriaeth Cymru) is a statutory body established by Section 72 of the Government of Wales Act 2006 to facilitate co-operation between the Welsh Government and local government in Wales.

== Role and responsibilities ==
The Government of Wales Act 2006 empowers the partnership council to:

- give advice to the Welsh Ministers about matters affecting the exercise of any of their functions,
- make representations to the Welsh Ministers about any matters affecting, or of concern to, those involved in local government in Wales, and
- give advice to those involved in local government in Wales.

== Membership ==
Members of the partnership council are appointed by the Welsh Government and include, Welsh Ministers, Deputy Welsh Ministers and the members of local authorities in Wales which include representatives from each of the 22 principal councils in Wales, community councils, national park authorities, police and crime commissioners, fire authorities and NHS Wales. Organisations described as "public service reform partners" also participate in the partnership council as observers. The partnership council is chaired by the Minister for Local Government. The partnership council has two sub-groups; the Distribution Sub-Group and the Finance Sub-Group

== Meetings ==
The partnership council usually meets three times a year. Meetings are held in person at either Tŷ Hywel or Crown Buildings or are held online.

== See also ==
- Council for Wales and Monmouthshire, an advisory body that existed between 1949 and 1966
- Welsh Local Government Association
