= Taith Joint Board =

The Taith Joint Board is a legally constituted joint committee of the six north Wales county authorities for the purpose of developing and implementing actions and strategies for transport in north Wales. It was formally established on 31 March 2004. Prior to that date it was an informal consortium of the six north Wales counties (Anglesey, Conwy County Borough, Denbighshire, Flintshire, Gwynedd, and Wrexham County Borough). Taith had originally been the Transport Sub-Committee of the North Wales Economic Forum and adopted the "Taith" name and style in 2002. Although Gwynedd is a member of Taith, the former Meirionnydd district of Gwynedd is included in the mid Wales "TraCC" transport consortium which covers Powys and Ceredigion also. The boundaries of the transport consortiums in Wales (though not the names) were formalised by "The Regional Transport Planning (Wales) Order" of the National Assembly for Wales in 2006. Apart from Taith and TraCC there are two other transport consortiums in Wales - SEWTA and SWWITCH

In early 2014 the Welsh transport minister, Edwina Hart, decided that the Welsh Government would not fund the regional transport consortiums after March 2014. There being no funding forthcoming from the local authorise the consortiums reverted to collaborative consultation groups ("talking shops").

== Aims and objectives ==
The aims of Taith are the development and adoption of a transport strategy and subsidiary strategies for the region embodying the following principles of extending the multi modal infrastructure of the Region, supporting sustainable improvements to the level of commercial and economic activity in the Region, enhancing the safety and quality of transport services and infrastructure within the Region, supporting a transport system meeting the needs of all the region's residents and promoting improvement to transport links and policy integration with other areas outside the region.

To achieve these aims, Taith undertook the development, review and implementation from time to time of a Regional Transportation Strategy in accordance with rules and requirements established by Welsh Assembly Government and agreed with the six county authorities. The then Welsh Assembly Government made available funding under its Transport Grant Programme to Taith for improving public transport infrastructure across north Wales. The programme for 2008 - 2009 was valued at £5.3 million. The Transport Grant system was replaced by a Regional Transport Plan system with funding allocations on a three-year rolling programme basis from 2010-2011.

== Ministerial Advisory Group "Phase Two Report on Transport" (July 2009) ==
The future of Taith and the other Regional Transport Consortiums (RTC) in Wales was called into question by the Ministerial Advisory Group Report of July 2009. This Group, appointed by and reporting to the Deputy First Minister and Transport Minister Ieuan Wyn Jones stated that "The organisational arrangements for transport are unnecessarily complicated and the regional transport consortia represent an unnecessary tier in the structure." (Report summary).

However the then Labour/Plaid Cymru coalition accepted only a few of the minor recommendations. The implication that the consortiums should be abolished was not accepted. The Labour Welsh Government in 2012 indicated that it expected the RTCs to take on administration of the revamped Bus Service Operator Grant from April 2013. (This in fact was done and by building a comprehensive database of bus services in north Wales, Taith was able to make substantial savings on BSOG expenditure by more closely matching operators claims to actual services operated). The RTCs continued to have a pivotal role in the Welsh Government smart card programme which administered the concessionary fare system for the over 60's and certain categories of people with disabilities until April 2014 when these responsibilities reverted to the county authorities. Welsh Government continues as the overall sponsor and funder of concessionary travel and associated smart cards.

== Effective closure ==
With the appointment of the new minister, Edwina Hart, the opinion of the Welsh Government turned decisively against the regional transport consortiums – despite the Williams Commission stating that 22 local authorities in Wales was far too many. In early 2014 the minister decided not to continue funding for them and that their functions would revert to the 22 county authorities. Taith Board concurred with decision and Taith effectively ceased operations on 30 June 2014. The staff were either made redundant or retained by Flintshire County Council for such limited continuing activities on a regional basis. The 2006 order was not revoked, Welsh Government simply withdrew funding which the constituent authorities did not replace. Thus, strictly speaking, Taith continues in existence, but has reverted to its pre-2004 status of a joint consultative forum for the six north Wales county authorities. It has ceased to have any operational functions.
