= Mid Wales Corporate Joint Committee =

Local government institution in Wales

Mid Wales Corporate Joint Committee Cyd-Bwyllgor Corfforedig y Canolbarth (Welsh)
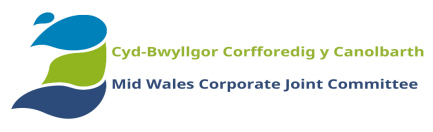

- Area covered by the Mid Wales Corporate Joint Committee

Type
- Type: Corporate Joint Committee of Mid Wales

History
- Founded: 1 April 2021

Leadership
- Chair: Jake Berriman

Elections
- Voting system: Indirect election

Meeting place
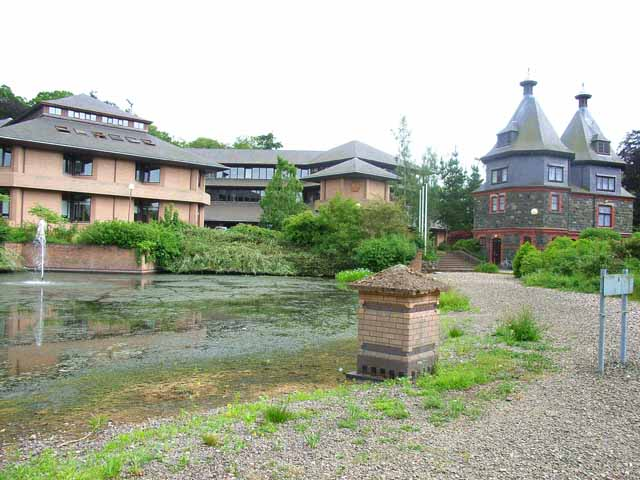
- County Hall, Llandrindod Wells, LD1 5LG

Website
- Mid Wales CJC

The Mid Wales Corporate Joint Committee (Welsh: Cyd-Bwyllgor Corfforedig y Canolbarth) is the Corporate Joint Committee for Mid Wales that was established in April 2021 by statutory instruments made under the Local Government and Elections (Wales) Act 2021. It is an indirectly elected body made up of leaders of principal councils and national park authorities in the region.

== Powers ==
Corporate Joint Committees have powers relating to economic well-being, strategic planning and the development of regional transport policies. They are corporate bodies which can employ staff, hold assets and have dedicated budgets.

The authority is responsible for the development of the regional transport plan for the region.

The Mid Wales Growth Deal sits outside the committee.

== Principal areas ==
The Mid Wales Corporate Joint Committee covers the two principal areas of Ceredigion and Powys.

== Members ==
The Mid Wales Corporate Joint Committee is an indirectly elected body made up of the leaders of the principal councils and national park authorities in the region. By law, CJCs must appoint a chief executive, a finance officer and a monitoring officer.

As of January 2026, the membership of the committee is as follows:

Name	Position within nominating authority	Nominating authority
Bryan Davies	Leader of the Council	Ceredigion County Council
Jake Berriman	Leader of the Council	Powys County Council
Gareth Ratcliffe	Vice-chairman	Bannau Brycheiniog National Park Authority

=== Leadership ===
Jake Berriman, leader of Powys County Council is chair of the Mid Wales CJC.

=== Sub-committees ===
The Mid West Wales CJC has the following subcommittees:

- Economic Well-Being Regional Economic Development (Mid Wales Growth Deal) Sub-Committee
- Governance and Audit Sub-Committee
- Overview and Scrutiny Sub-Committee
- Regional Transport Planning Sub-Committee
- Standards Sub-Committee
- Strategic Development Planning Sub-Committee

== See also ==
- Mid Wales Growth Deal
- North and Mid Wales Trunk Road Agent
