= South West Wales Corporate Joint Committee =

Local government institution in Wales

South West Wales Corporate Joint Committee Cyd-bwyllgor Corfforedig y De-orllewin Cymru (Welsh)
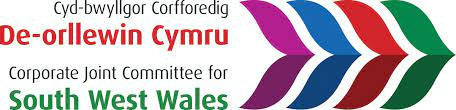

- Area covered by the South West Wales Corporate Joint Committee

Type
- Type: Corporate Joint Committee of South West Wales

History
- Founded: 1 April 2021

Leadership
- Chair: Rob Stewart
- Vice-chair: Steve Hunt

Elections
- Voting system: Indirect election

Meeting place
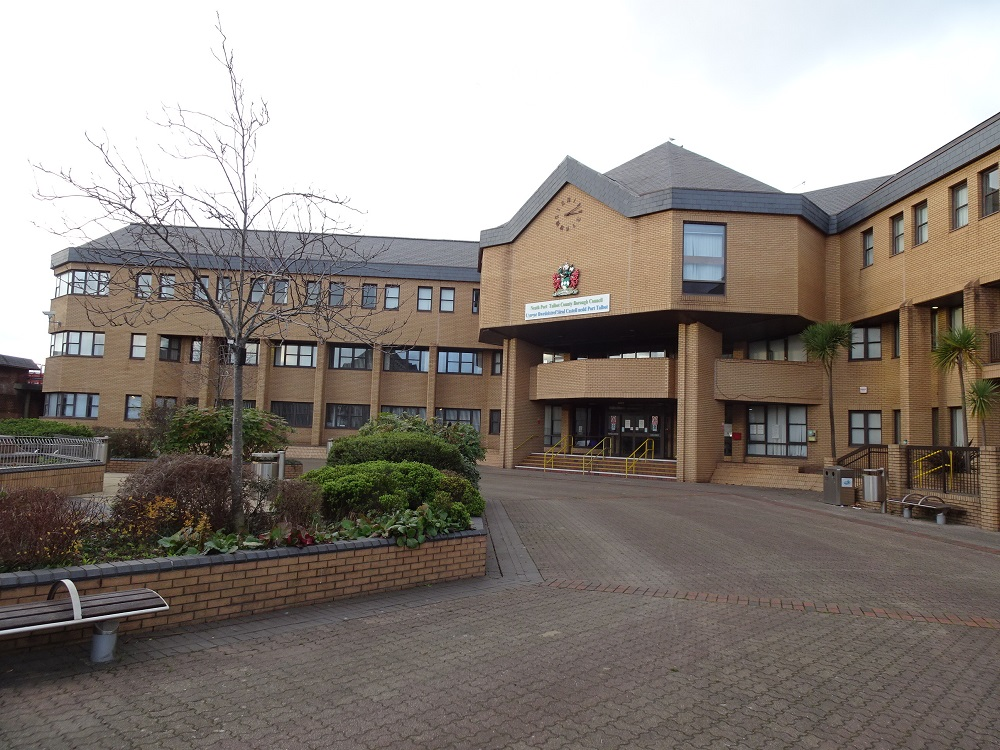
- Civic Centre, Port Talbot, SA13 1PJ

Website
- http://www.cjcsouthwest.wales

The South West Wales Corporate Joint Committee (Welsh: Cyd-bwyllgor Corfforedig y De-orllewin Cymru) is the Corporate Joint Committee for South West Wales that was established in April 2021 by statutory instruments made under the Local Government and Elections (Wales) Act 2021. It is an indirectly elected body made up of leaders of principal councils and national park authorities in the region.

== Powers ==
Corporate joint committees have powers relating to economic well-being, strategic planning and the development of regional transport policies. They are corporate bodies which can employ staff, hold assets and have dedicated budgets.

The CJC adopted the name "Rhwydwaith De-orllewin Cymru" as the brand name for its integrated transport network.

== Principal areas ==
The South West Wales Corporate Joint Committee covers the four principal areas of Carmarthenshire, Neath Port Talbot, Pembrokeshire and Swansea. The CJC's area is coterminous with that of the Swansea Bay City Region.

== Members ==
The South West Wales Corporate Joint Committee is an indirectly elected body made up of the leaders of the principal councils and national park authorities in the region. By law, CJCs must appoint a chief executive, a finance officer and a monitoring officer.

As of May 2026, the membership of the committee is as follows:

Name	Position within nominating authority	Nominating authority
Linda Evans	Leader of the Council	Carmarthenshire County Council
Steve Hunt	Leader of the Council	Neath Port Talbot County Borough Council
David Simpson	Leader of the Council	Pembrokeshire County Council
Rob Stewart	Leader of the Council	City and County of Swansea Council
Liz Bickerton	Representative	Pembrokeshire Coast National Park Authority

=== Leadership ===
Rob Stewart, leader of City and County of Swansea Council is chair of the West Wales CJC, and Darren Price, leader of Carmarthenshire County Council, is vice-chair.

=== Sub-committees ===
The South West Wales CJC has the following subcommittees:

- Economic Well Being and Regional Economic Development Sub-Committee
- Energy Sub-Committee
- Governance and Audit Sub-Committee
- Overview and Scrutiny Sub-Committee
- Regional Transport Sub-Committee
- Strategic Planning Sub-Committee

== See also ==
- Swansea Bay City Region
- South Wales Trunk Road Agent
- South West Wales Integrated Transport Consortium
