= Geography of Wales =

- Relief map of Wales

- Continent: Europe
- Region: British Isles
- Area
  - Total: 21,218 km^{2} (8,192 sq mi)
- Highest point: Snowdon (Welsh: Yr Wyddfa) 1,085 m (3,560 ft)
- Longest river: River Severn (Welsh: Afon Hafren) 354 km (220 mi)
- Largest lake: Llyn Tegid (Bala Lake); 4.8 km^{2} (1.9 sq mi)
- Climate: Temperate

Wales is a country that is part of the United Kingdom and whose physical geography is characterised by a varied coastline and a largely upland interior. It is bordered by England to its east, the Irish Sea to its north and west, and the Bristol Channel to its south. It has a total area of 2,064,100 hectares (5,101,000 acres) and is about 170 mi (274 km) from north to south and at least 60 mi (97 km) wide. It comprises 8.35 percent of the land of the United Kingdom. It has a number of offshore islands, by far the largest of which is Anglesey. The mainland coastline, including Anglesey, is about 1,680 mi (2,704 km) in length. As of 2014, Wales had a population of about 3,092,000; Cardiff is the capital and largest city and is situated in the urbanised area of South East Wales.

Wales has a complex geological history which has left it a largely mountainous country. The coastal plain is narrow in the north and west of the country but wider in the south, where the Vale of Glamorgan has some of the best agricultural land. Exploitation of the South Wales Coalfield during the Industrial Revolution resulted in the development of an urban economy in the South Wales Valleys, and the expansion of the port cities of Newport, Cardiff and Swansea for the export of coal. The smaller North Wales Coalfield was also developed at this time, but elsewhere in the country, the landscape is rural and communities are small, the economy being largely dependent on agriculture and tourism. The climate is influenced by the proximity of the country to the Atlantic Ocean and the prevailing westerly winds; thus it tends to be mild, cloudy, wet and windy.

== Physical geography ==
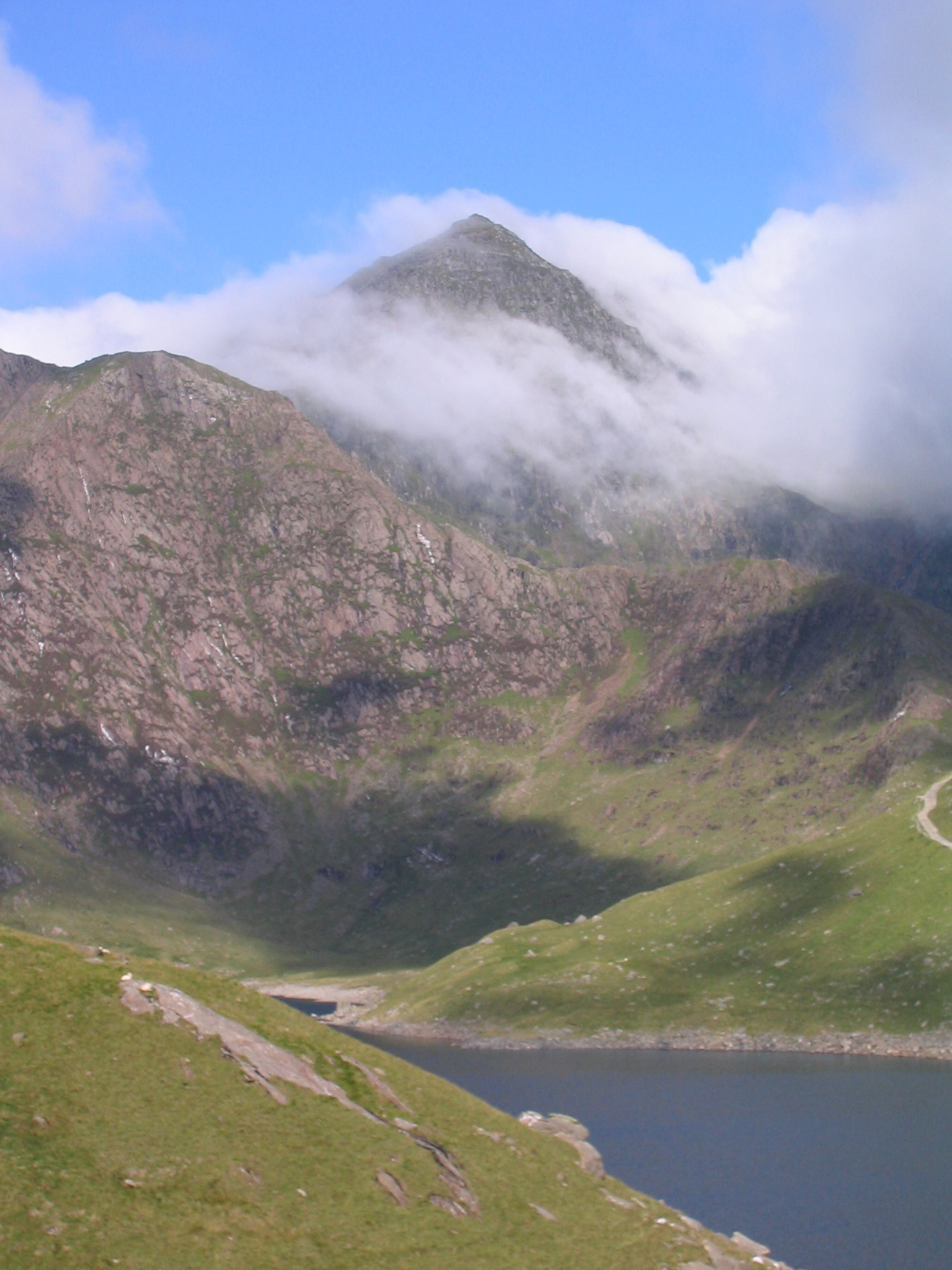
The summit of Snowdon, the highest mountain in Wales

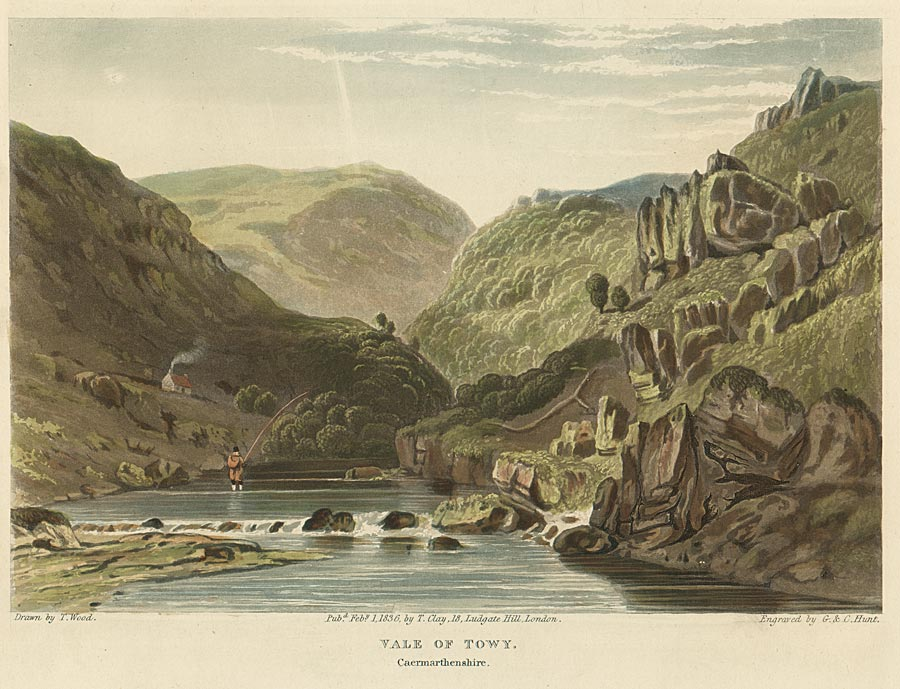
Depiction of the Vale of Towy, Carmarthenshire

Wales is located on the western side of central southern Great Britain. To the north and west is the Irish Sea, and to the south is the Bristol Channel. The English counties of Cheshire, Shropshire, Herefordshire and Gloucestershire lie to the east. Much of the border with England roughly follows the line of the ancient earthwork known as Offa's Dyke. The large island of Anglesey lies off the northwest coast, separated from mainland Wales by the Menai Strait, and there are a number of smaller islands.

Most of Wales is mountainous. Snowdonia (Welsh: Eryri) in the northwest has the highest mountains, with Snowdon (Yr Wyddfa) at 1,085 m (3,560 ft) being the highest peak. To the south of the main range lie the Arenig Group, Cadair Idris and the Berwyn Mountains. In the northeast of Wales, between the Clwyd Valley and the Dee Estuary, lies the Clwydian Range. The 14 (or possibly 15) peaks over 3,000 feet (914 m), all in Snowdonia, are known collectively as the Welsh 3000s.

The Cambrian Mountains run from northeast to southwest and occupy most of the central part of the country. These are more rounded and undulating, clad in moorland and rough, tussocky grassland. In the south of the country are the Brecon Beacons in central Powys, the Black Mountains (Y Mynyddoedd Duon) spread across parts of Powys and Monmouthshire in southeast Wales and, confusingly, Black Mountain (Y Mynydd Du), which lies further west on the border between Carmarthenshire and Powys.

The Welsh lowland zone consists of the north coastal plain, the island of Anglesey, part of the Llŷn Peninsula, a narrow strip of coast along Cardigan Bay, much of Pembrokeshire and southern Carmarthenshire, the Gower Peninsula and the Vale of Glamorgan. The main rivers are the River Dee, part of which forms the boundary between Wales and England, the River Clwyd and the River Conwy, which all flow northwards into Liverpool Bay and the Irish Sea. Further round the coast, the Rivers Mawddach, Dovey, Rheidol, Ystwyth and Teifi flow westwards into Cardigan Bay, and the rivers Towy, Taff, Usk and Wye flow southwards into the Bristol Channel. Parts of the River Severn form the boundary between Wales and England.

The length of the coast of mainland Wales is about 1,370 mi (2,205 km), and adding to this the coasts of the Isle of Anglesey and Holy Island, the total is about 1,680 mi (2,704 km). Cardigan Bay is the largest bay in the country and Llyn Tegid (Bala Lake) the largest lake at 4.7 km^{2} (1.8 mi^{2}). Other large lakes include Llyn Trawsfynydd at 1.8 mi^{2} (4.7 km^{2}), Lake Vyrnwy at 1.7 mi^{2} (4.4 km^{2}), Llyn Brenig at 1.4 mi^{2} (3.6 km^{2}), Llyn Celyn at 1.2 mi^{2} (3.1 km^{2}) and Llyn Alaw at 1.2 mi^{2} (3.1 km^{2}). Bala Lake lies in a glacial valley blocked by a terminal moraine, but the other lakes are reservoirs created by impounding rivers, to provide drinking water, hydroelectric schemes or flood defences, and many are also used recreationally.

== Geology ==
Geologic map of Wales

The geology of Wales is complex and varied. The earliest outcropping rocks are from the Precambrian era, some 700 Mya, and are found in Anglesey, the Llŷn peninsula, southwestern Pembrokeshire and in places near the English border. During the Lower Palaeozoic, as seas periodically flooded the land and retreated again, thousands of metres of sedimentary and volcanic rocks accumulated in a marine basin known as the Welsh Basin. Rocks found in a quarry near to the village Llangynog, Carmarthenshire, in 1977 contain some of the Earth's oldest fossils which date from the Ediacaran period, 564 million years ago, when Wales was part of the micro-continent Avalonia.

During the early and middle Ordovician period (485 to 460 Mya), volcanic activity increased. One large volcanic system, which was centred around what is now Snowdon, emitted an estimated 60 cubic kilometres (14 cu mi) of debris. Another volcano formed Rhobell Fawr near Dolgellau. During this period, great accumulations of sand, gravel and mud were deposited further south in Wales, and these gradually consolidated. Some of the volcanic ash fell in the sea and formed great banks, where unstable masses sometimes slid into deeper water, creating submarine avalanches. This caused great turbidity in the sea, after which the particles began to settle out according to particle size. The strata thus formed are called turbidites, and these are common in central Wales, being particularly obvious in the sea cliffs around Aberystwyth.

By the beginning of the Devonian period (420 Mya) the sea was retreating from the Welsh Basin as the land was thrust up by the collision of land masses, forming a new range of mountains, the Welsh Caledonides. The Old Red Sandstone represents debris from their erosion. Elsewhere the strata were compressed and deformed, and in places, the clay minerals recrystallised, developing a grain that allowed parallel cleavage, making it easy to split the rocks into thin flat sheets of stone known as slate. In the early part of the Carboniferous period, reinvasion of southern and northern parts of Wales by the sea resulted in depositions of limestone, and extensive swamps in South Wales gave rise to peat deposits and the eventual formation of coal measures. Erosion of nearby upland areas resulted in the formation of sandstones and mudstones in the later part of the period. Southwestern Wales, in particular, was affected by the Variscan orogeny, a period when continental collisions further south caused complex folding and fracturing of the strata.

During the Permian, Triassic and Jurassic (300 to 150 Mya), further episodes of desertification, subsidence and uplift occurred and Wales was alternately inundated by the sea and raised above it. By the Cretaceous (140 to 70 Mya), Wales was permanently above sea level and in the Pleistocene (2.5 Mya to recent), it underwent several exceptionally cold periods, the ice ages. The mountains we see today largely assumed their present shape during the last ice age, the Devensian glaciation.

In the mid 19th century, two prominent geologists, Roderick Murchison and Adam Sedgwick, used their studies of the geology of Wales to establish certain principles of stratigraphy and palaeontology. From the Latin name for Wales, Cambria (derived from Cymru), was derived the name of the earliest geological period of the Paleozoic era, the Cambrian. After much dispute, the next two periods of the Paleozoic era, the Ordovician and Silurian, were named after pre-Roman Celtic tribes of Wales, the Ordovices and Silures.

== Climate ==
Wales has a maritime climate, the predominant winds being southwesterlies and westerlies blowing in from the Atlantic Ocean. This means that the weather in Wales is in general mild, cloudy, wet and windy. The country's wide geographic variations cause localised differences in amounts of sunshine, rainfall and temperature. Rainfall in Wales varies widely, with the highest average annual totals in Snowdonia and the Brecon Beacons, and the lowest near the coast and in the east, close to the English border. Throughout Wales, the winter months are significantly wetter than the summer ones. Snow is comparatively rare near sea level in Wales, but much more frequent over the hills, and the uplands experience harsher conditions in winter than the more low-lying parts.

The mean annual temperatures in Wales are about 11 °C (52 °F) on the coast and 9.5 °C (49 °F) in low-lying inland areas. It becomes cooler at higher altitudes, with a mean decrease in annual temperatures of approximately 0.5 °C (0.9 °F) for each 100 metres (330 feet) of increased altitude. Consequently, the higher parts of Snowdonia experience mean annual temperatures of 5 °C (41 °F). At nights, the coldest conditions occur when there is little wind and no cloud cover, especially when the ground is snow-clad; the lowest temperature recorded in Wales was in conditions of this sort at Rhayader on New Year's Day, 1940, when the temperature fell to −23.3 °C (−9.9 °F). Occasionally, the coastal area of North Wales experiences some of the warmest winter conditions in the United Kingdom, with temperatures up to 18 °C (64 °F); these result from a Foehn wind, a south-westerly airflow warming up as it descends from the mountains of Snowdonia.

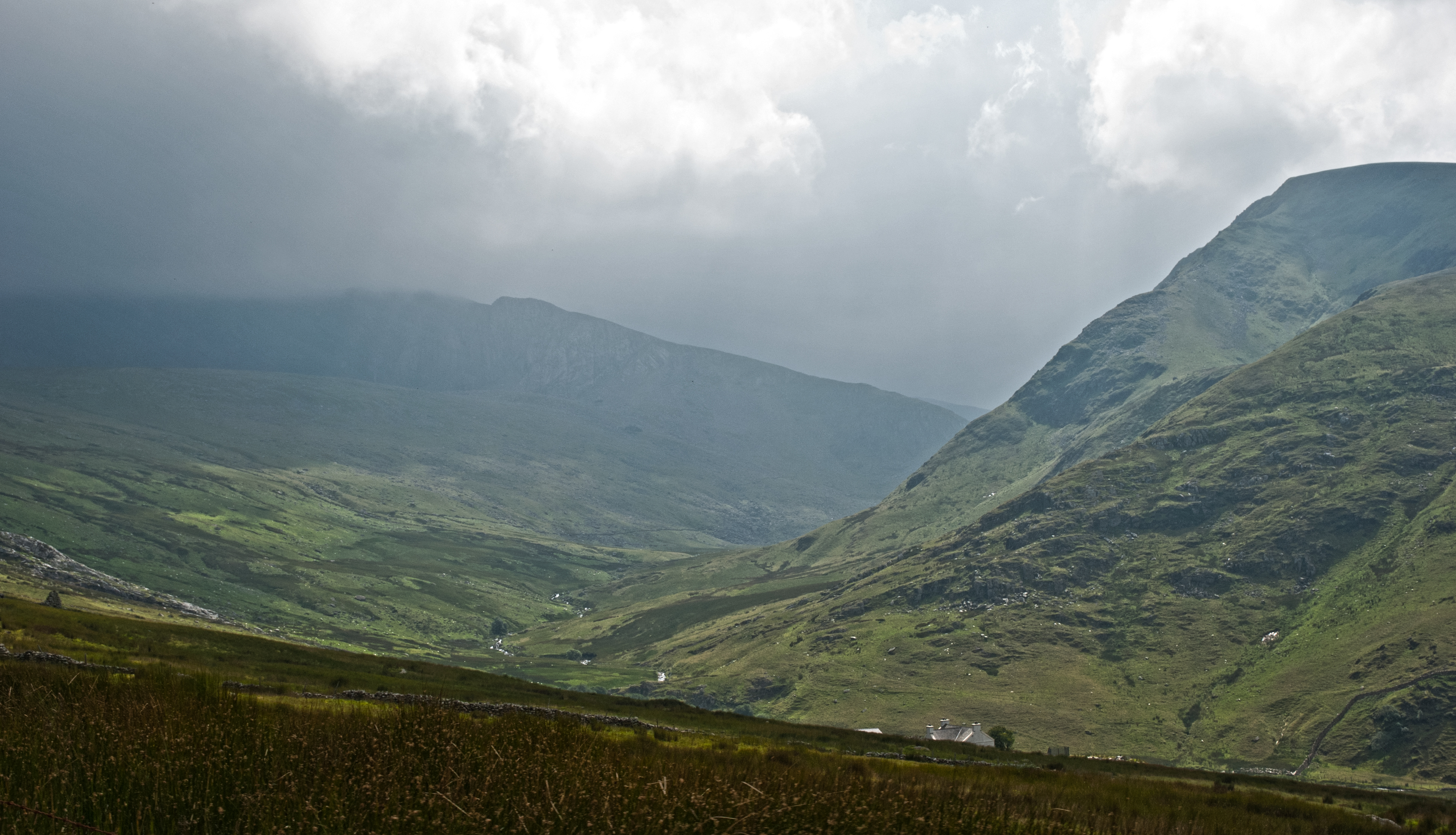
Rain coming in from the west in Snowdonia

Rainfall in Wales is mostly as a result of the arrival of Atlantic low pressure systems and is heaviest between October and January over the whole country. The driest months are usually April, May and June, and Wales experiences fewer summer thunderstorms than England. Rainfall varies across the country with the highest records being from the greatest elevations. Snowdonia experiences total annual rainfalls exceeding 3,000 mm (118 in) whereas coastal regions of Wales and the English border may have less than 1,000 mm (39 in). The combination of mountainous areas and Atlantic lows can produce large quantities of rain and sometimes results in flooding. The amount of snowfall varies with altitude and enormously from year to year. In the lowlands, the number of days with lying snow may vary from zero to thirty or more, with an average of about twenty in Snowdonia.

Wales is one of the windier parts of the United Kingdom. The strongest winds are usually associated with Atlantic depressions; as one of these arrives, the winds usually start in the southwest, before veering to the west and then to the northwest as the system passes by. The southwest of Pembrokeshire experiences the most gale-force winds. The highest wind speed ever recorded in Wales at a lowland site was gusts of 108 knots (200 km/h; 124 mph) at Rhoose, in the Vale of Glamorgan, on 28 October 1989.

== Land use ==
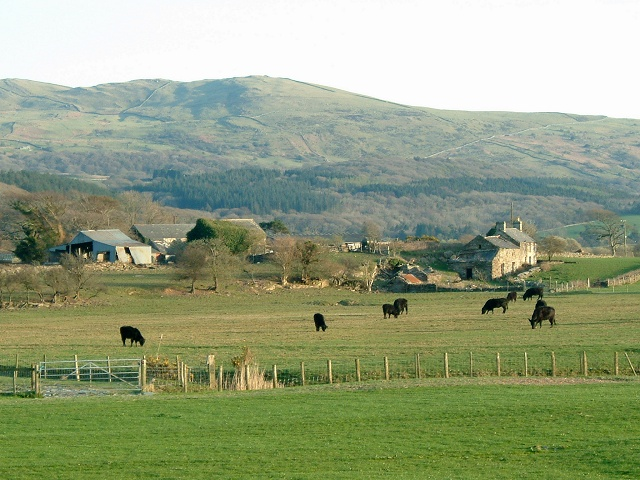
Hill farm with Welsh Black cattle

The total terrestrial surface of Wales is 2,064,100 hectares (5,101,000 acres). The area of land used for agriculture and forestry in the country in 2013 was 1,712,845 hectares (4,232,530 acres). Of this 79,461 hectares (196,350 acres) was used for arable cropping and fallow, 1,449 hectares (3,580 acres) for horticulture, and 1,405,156 hectares (3,472,220 acres) was used for grazing. Woodland occupied 63,366 hectares (156,580 acres) and 10,126 hectares (25,020 acres) was unclassified land. In addition, there were 180,305 hectares (445,540 acres) of common rough grazing, giving a total area of all the land used for agriculture purposes, including common land, of 1,739,863 hectares (4,299,300 acres).

In order of area planted, the arable crops grown in Wales were: foods for stock-feeding, spring barley, wheat, maize, winter barley, other cereals for combining, oilseed rape, potatoes and other crops. The grassland was predominantly permanent pasture, with only 10% of the grassland being under five years old. Compared with other parts of the United Kingdom, Wales has the smallest percentage of arable land (6%), and a considerably smaller area of rough grazing and hill land than Scotland (27% against 62%).

== Natural resources ==
Vast quantities of coal were mined in Wales during the Industrial Revolution and the earlier part of the twentieth century, after which coal stocks dwindled and the remaining pits became uneconomical as foreign coal became available at low prices. The last deep pit in Wales closed in 2008.

Ironstone outcrops along the northern edge of the South Wales Coalfield were extensively worked for the production of iron and were important in the initiation of the Industrial Revolution in South Wales.

Lead, silver and to a lesser extent zinc were mined in the upland areas of the rivers Ystwyth and Rheidol and in the headwaters of the River Severn for centuries and smaller deposits were also mined at Pentre Halkyn in Flintshire during the Roman occupation of Britain. Copper was a major export from Parys Mountain on Anglesey which was, at its height, the largest copper mine in the world.

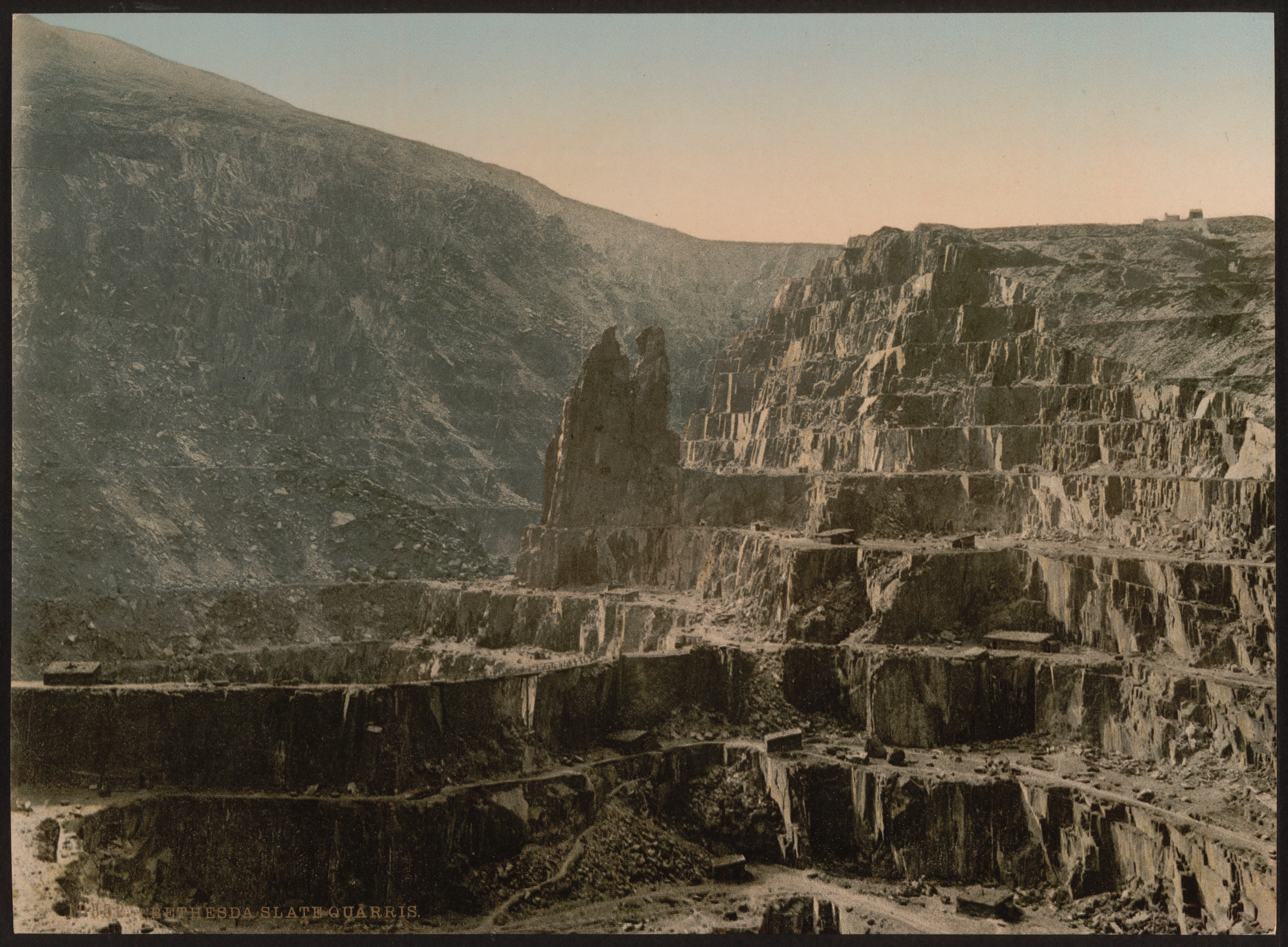
Penrhyn Quarry in about 1900

Slate quarrying has been a major industry in North Wales. The Cilgwyn Quarry was being worked in the 12th century, but later Blaenau Ffestiniog became the centre of production.

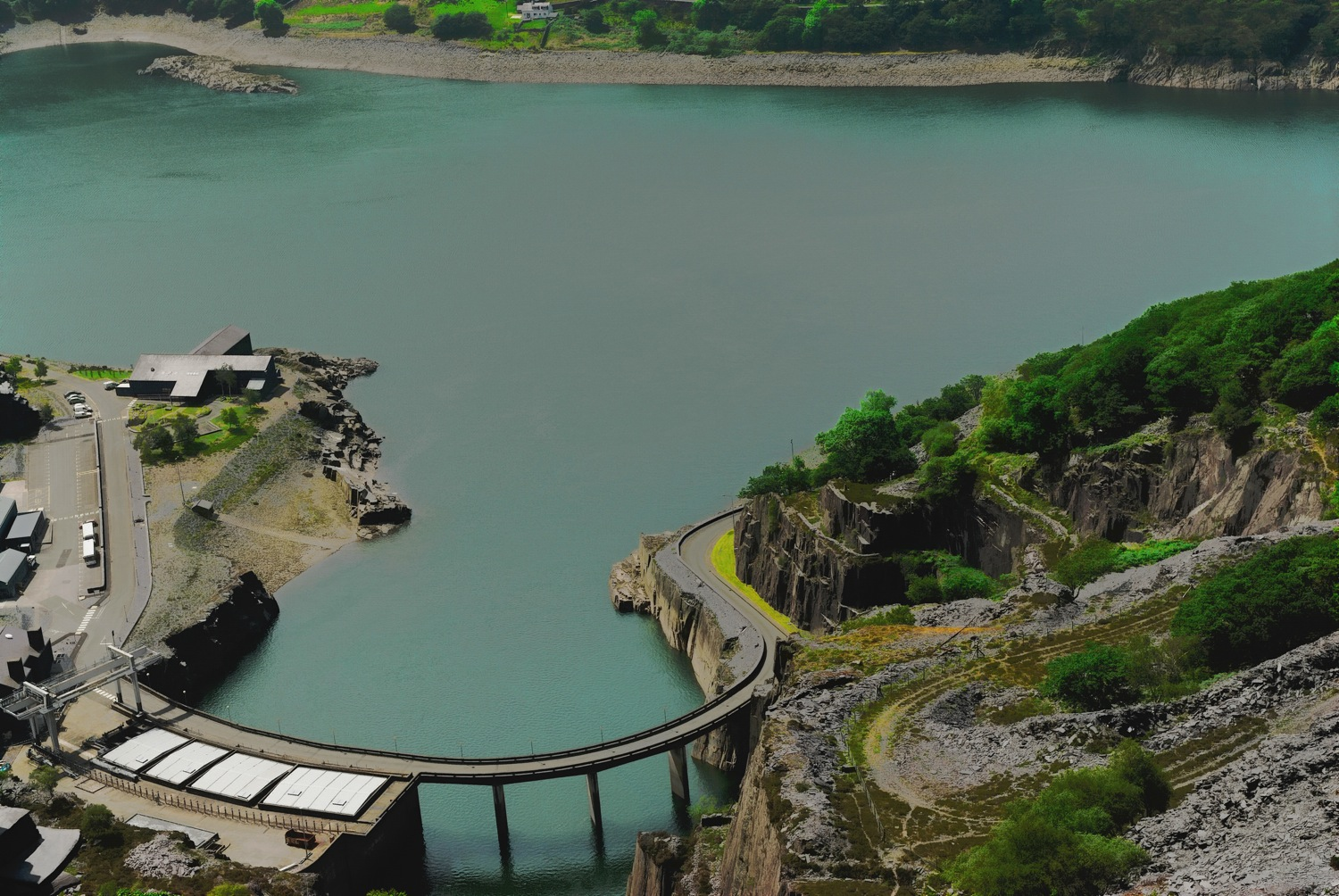
The Dinorwig Power Station lower reservoir, a 1,800 MW pumped-storage hydroelectric scheme, one of the largest such schemes in Europe

With its mountainous terrain and ample rainfall, water is one of Wales's most abundant resources. The country has many man-made reservoirs and exports water to England as well as generating power through hydroelectric schemes.

Wind is another resource that Wales has in abundance. Gwynt y Môr is one of several offshore wind farms off the coast of the North Wales mainland and Anglesey, and is the second largest such wind farm in the world.

== Political geography ==
=== Border between Wales and England ===
The modern border between Wales and England was largely defined by the Laws in Wales Acts 1535 and 1542, based on the boundaries of medieval Marcher lordships. According to the Welsh historian John Davies:

Thus was created the border between Wales and England, a border which has survived until today. It did not follow the old line of Offa's Dyke nor the eastern boundary of the Welsh dioceses; it excluded districts such as Oswestry and Ewias, where the Welsh language would continue to be spoken for centuries, districts which it would not be wholly fanciful to consider as Cambria irredenta. Yet, as the purpose of the statute was to incorporate Wales into England, the location of the Welsh border was irrelevant to the purposes of its framers.

The boundary has never been confirmed by referendum or reviewed by a Boundary Commission. The boundary line very roughly follows Offa's Dyke from south to north as far as a point about 40 miles (64 km) from the northern coast, but then swings further east. It has a number of anomalies, but some were ironed out by the Counties (Detached Parts) Act 1844. For instance, it separates Knighton from its railway station, and divides the village of Llanymynech where a pub straddles the line.

=== Local government ===
Wales is divided into 22 unitary authorities, which are responsible for the provision of all local government services, including education, social work, environmental and road services. Below these in some areas there are community councils, which cover specific areas within a council area. The unitary authority areas are known as "principal areas". The King appoints Lords Lieutenant to represent him in the eight preserved counties of Wales.

In the Office for National Statistics Area Classification, local authorities are clustered into groups based in the six main census dimensions (demographic, household composition, housing, socio-economic, employment and industry sector). Most of the local authorities in mid and west Wales are classified as part of the 'Coastal and Countryside' supergroup. Most of the south Wales authorities, Flintshire and Wrexham are in the 'Mining and Manufacturing' supergroup; Cardiff is part of the 'Cities and Services' supergroup and the Vale of Glamorgan is part of 'Prospering UK'.

== Social geography ==
A number of historians of Wales have questioned the notion of a single, cohesive Welsh identity. For example, in 1921, Alfred Zimmern, the inaugural professor of international relations at the University of Wales, Aberystwyth, argued that there was "not one Wales, but three": archetypal 'Welsh Wales', industrial or 'American Wales', and upper-class 'English Wales'. Each represented different parts of the country and different traditions. In 1985, political analyst Dennis Balsom proposed a similar 'Three Wales model'. Balsom's regions were the Welsh-speaking heartland of the north and west, Y Fro Gymraeg; a consciously Welsh but not Welsh-speaking 'Welsh Wales' in the South Wales Valleys and a more ambivalent 'British Wales' making up the remainder, largely in the east and along the south coast. The division reflects, broadly, the areas where Plaid Cymru, Labour, and the Conservatives and Liberal Democrats respectively enjoyed the most political support.

Topography has traditionally limited integration between North and South Wales, with the two halves virtually functioning as separate economic and social units in the preindustrial era, with successive British Government transport policy doing little to rectify this. Today, the main road and rail links run east-west, although there was once a north-south rail link that pressure groups are attempting to reinstate. By the interwar years, industry in South Wales was increasingly linked to Avonside and the English Midlands, and that in north Wales to Merseyside.

Liverpool was often called "the capital of north Wales" in the late 19th and early 20th centuries. With 20,000 Welsh-born people living on either side of the Mersey in 1901, the city had an array of Welsh chapels and cultural institutions; hosted the National Eisteddfod in 1884, 1900 and 1929 and gave rise to several leading figures in Welsh life in the 20th century. The Liverpool Daily Post became, effectively, the daily newspaper for north Wales. The decline of Liverpool after the Second World War and changing patterns of Welsh migration caused the Welsh presence to diminish. In the 1960s, the flooding of the Tryweryn Valley to provide the city with water soured relations with many people in Wales.

The North Welsh are sometimes referred to, in Wenglish, as Gogs (from the Welsh gogledd, "north") and the south Welsh as Hwntws (from tu hwnt roughly meaning 'far away over there' or 'beyond'). There are differences in the Welsh vocabulary between the north and south; for instance, the south Welsh word for now is nawr whereas the north Welsh is rŵan.

The more urbanised south, containing cities such as Cardiff, Newport and Swansea, was historically home to the coal and steel industries. It contrasts with the mostly rural north, where agriculture and slate quarrying were the main industries. Although the M4 corridor brings wealth into South Wales, particularly Cardiff, there is no pronounced economic divide between north and south unlike in England; there is, for example, a high level of poverty in the postindustrial South Wales Valleys.

== Demography ==
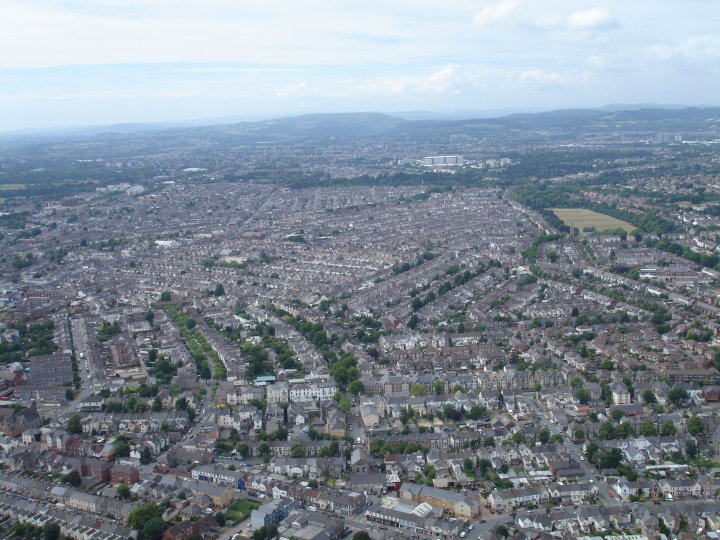
Cardiff is the most densely populated area in Wales

The estimated population of Wales in 2019 was about 3,152,879, an increase of 14,248 on the previous year. The main population and industrial areas in Wales are in South Wales, specifically Cardiff, Swansea and Newport and the adjoining South Wales Valleys. Cardiff is the capital city and had a population of around 346,000 at the 2011 census. This was followed by the unitary authorities of Swansea (239,000), Rhondda Cynon Taf (234,400), Carmarthenshire (183,800), Caerphilly (178,800), Flintshire (152,500), Newport (145,700), Neath Port Talbot (139,800), Bridgend (139,200) and Wrexham (134,800). Cardiff was the most heavily populated area in Wales with 2,482 people per square kilometre (6,428 per sq mile) while Powys had just 26.

A high proportion of the Welsh population lives in smaller settlements: nearly 20% live in villages of less than 1,500 persons compared with 10% in England. Wales also has a relatively low proportion of its population in large settlements: only 26% live in urban areas with a population over 100,000; in comparison, nearly 40% of the English population live in urban areas larger than the largest in Wales. Another feature of the settlement pattern in Wales is the share of the population living in the sparsest rural areas: 15% compared with only 1.5% in England.

== Communications ==
Communications within Wales are influenced by the topography and the mountainous nature of the country: the main rail and road routes between South and North Wales loop to the east and pass largely through England. The only motorway corridor in Wales is the M4 motorway from London to South Wales, entering the country over the Second Severn Crossing, passing close to Newport, Cardiff and Swansea and extending as far west as the Pont Abraham services before continuing northwest as the A48 to Carmarthen. The M48 motorway parallels the M4 between Aust and Magor via Chepstow. The A40 is a major trunk road connecting London to Fishguard via Brecon and Carmarthen. The A487 coast road links Cardigan with Aberystwyth, and the A44 links Aberystwyth with Rhayader, Leominster and Worcester. The main trunk road in North Wales is the A55 dual carriageway road from Chester past St Asaph and Abergele, continuing along the coast to Bangor, crossing Anglesey and terminating at Holyhead. The A483 runs from Swansea to Chester passing Llandovery, Llandrindod Wells, Oswestry (in England) and Wrexham.

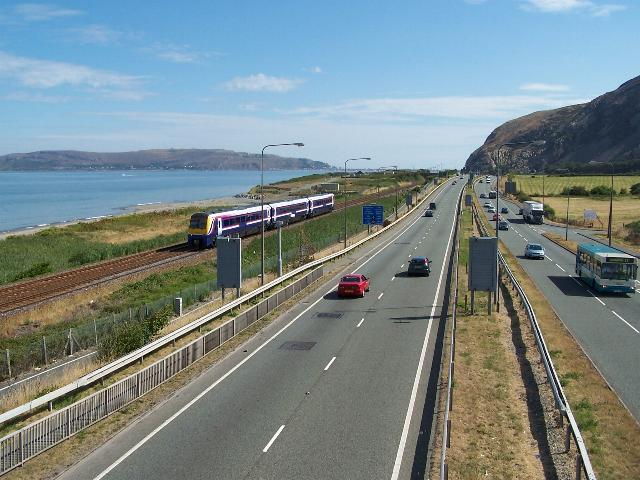
The A55 running alongside the North Wales Coast Line

The South Wales Main Line links London Paddington with Swansea, entering Wales through the Severn Tunnel. Other main line services from the Midlands and the North of England join this at Newport. Branch lines serve the South Wales Valleys, Barry, and destinations beyond Swansea which include the ferry terminals at Fishguard and Pembroke Dock. The Heart of Wales Line links Llanelli with Craven Arms in Shropshire. The Cambrian Line crosses the centre of Wales, with trains from Shrewsbury to Welshpool, Aberystwyth and Pwllheli. The North Wales Coast Line links Crewe and Chester to Bangor and Holyhead, from where there is a ferry service to Ireland. Passengers can change at Shotton for the Borderlands Line, which links Wrexham with Bidston on the Wirral Peninsula, and at Conwy for the Conwy Valley Line to Blaenau Festiniog. The Shrewsbury–Chester line between Chester and Shrewsbury in England, passes through Wrexham, Chirk and Ruabon in Wales.

Cardiff Airport is the only airport in Wales which offers international scheduled flights. Destinations available include other parts of the United Kingdom, Ireland and parts of continental Europe. The airport is also used for charter flights on a seasonal basis. In 2018, around 1.6 million passengers used the airport. Several ferry services operate between Welsh ports and Ireland: Holyhead to Dublin; Fishguard to Rosslare; Pembroke Dock to Rosslare; and Swansea to Cork.

== Protected areas ==
The three national parks of Wales

Wales has three designated national parks. Snowdonia National Park in northwestern Wales was established in 1951 as the third national park in Britain, following the Peak District and the Lake District. It covers 827 square miles (2,140 km^{2}) of the mountains of Snowdonia and has 37 miles (60 km) of coastline. The Pembrokeshire Coast National Park was established the following year to protect the spectacular coastal scenery of West Wales. It includes Caldey Island, the Daugleddau estuary and the Preseli Hills, as well as the entire length of the Pembrokeshire Coast Path. The Brecon Beacons National Park was established five years later and extends across the southern part of Powys, the northwestern part of Monmouthshire, parts of eastern Carmarthenshire and the northern parts of several South Wales Valleys county boroughs. In each case, the national park authority acts as a special purpose local authority and exercises planning control over residential and industrial development in the park. The authorities have a duty to conserve the natural beauty of the area, and to promote opportunities for members of the public to enjoy and appreciate the park's special qualities.

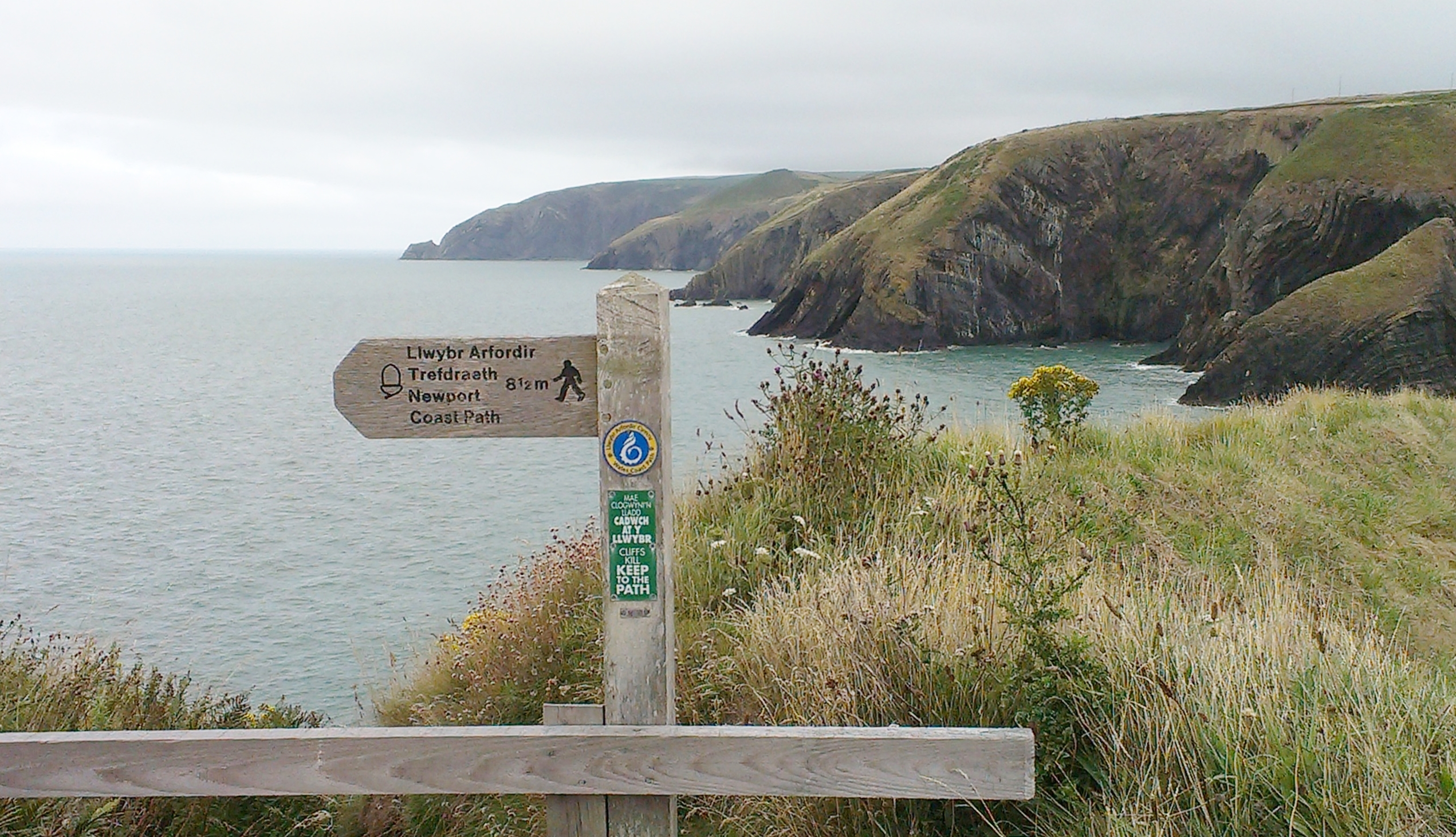
The Pembrokeshire Coast Path near Ceibwr Bay

Wales also has five Areas of Outstanding Natural Beauty. These differ from National Parks in that the local authorities have a duty to conserve and enhance the natural beauty of the landscape but do not have an obligation to promote the enjoyment of the public. Partnerships established to administer AONBs do not have control over planning, responsibility for which remains with the constituent local authorities. In 1956, the Gower Peninsula became the first designated AONB in Britain. Other AONBs are: the coast of Anglesey; the Llŷn Peninsula; the Clwydian Range and Dee Valley; and the Wye Valley, part of which is in England.

Wales has many waterfalls, including some of the most striking in the United Kingdom. One such is the 240 ft (73 m) Pistyll Rhaeadr near the village of Llanrhaeadr-ym-Mochnant. It is formed as a mountain stream drops over a cliff and changes character to a lowland river, the Afon Rhaeadr. The site was designated by the Countryside Council for Wales as the 1000th Site of Special Scientific Interest in Wales, because of its importance to an understanding of Welsh geomorphology. The 19th-century English author George Borrow remarked of the waterfall, "I never saw water falling so gracefully, so much like thin, beautiful threads, as here."

== See also ==
=== Wales ===
- Regions of Wales
- Geology of Wales
- Coastline of Wales
- List of Blue Flag Beaches of Wales
- List of islands of Wales
- Little England beyond Wales

=== Other ===
- Geography of the United Kingdom
- Geography of England
- Geography of Scotland
- Geography of Ireland
