= North Wales Corporate Joint Committee =

Local government institution in Wales

North Wales Corporate Joint Committee Cyd-bwyllgor Corfforedig Gogledd Cymru (Welsh)

- Area covered by the North Wales Corporate Joint Committee

Type
- Type: Corporate Joint Committee of North Wales

History
- Founded: 1 April 2021

Leadership
- Chair: Mark Pritchard
- Vice-chair: Jason McLellan

Elections
- Voting system: Indirect election

Meeting place
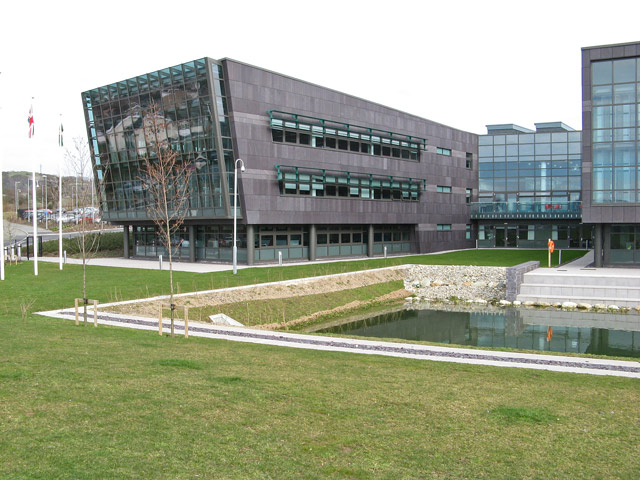
- Government Buildings, Sarn Mynach, Llandudno Junction, LL31 9RZ

Website
- North Wales CJC

The North Wales Corporate Joint Committee (Welsh: Cyd-bwyllgor Corfforedig Gogledd Cymru) is the Corporate Joint Committee for North Wales that was established in April 2021 by statutory instruments made under the Local Government and Elections (Wales) Act 2021. It is an indirectly elected body made up of leaders of principal councils and national park authorities in the region.

== Powers ==
Corporate Joint Committees have powers relating to economic well-being, strategic planning and the development of regional transport policies. They are corporate bodies which can employ staff, hold assets and have dedicated budgets. In December 2021, it was agreed that Ambition North Wales would be absorbed into the North Wales CJC, with a subcommittee being formed allow the North Wales CJC to carry out the statutory functions of an Economic Ambition Board.

== Principal areas ==
The North Wales Corporate Joint Committee covers the six principal areas of the Isle of Anglesey, Conwy County Borough, Denbighshire, Flintshire, Gwynedd, and Wrexham County Borough.

== Members ==
The North Wales Corporate Joint Committee is an indirectly elected body made up of the leaders of the principal councils and national park authorities in the region. By law, CJCs must appoint a chief executive, a finance officer and a monitoring officer.

As of April 2026, the membership of the committee is as follows:

Name	Position within nominating authority	Nominating authority
Gary Pritchard	Leader of the Council	Isle of Anglesey County Council
Julie Fallon	Leader of the Council	Conwy County Borough Council
Jason McLellan	Leader of the Council	Denbighshire County Council
Dave Hughes	Leader of the Council	Flintshire County Council
Nia Jeffreys	Leader of the Council	Cyngor Gwynedd
Mark Pritchard	Leader of the Council	Wrexham County Borough Council
Edgar Wyn Owen	Chair of National Park Authority	Eryri National Park Authority

=== Leadership ===
As of April 2026, Mark Pritchard, leader of Wrexham County Borough Council is chair of the North Wales CJC, and Jason McLellan, leader of Denbighshire County Council, is vice-chair.

== See also ==
- Ambition North Wales
- Betsi Cadwaladr University Health Board
- North Wales Police and Crime Commissioner
- North and Mid Wales Trunk Road Agent
