= South West Wales =

Region of Wales

Coordinates: 51°48′N 3°58′W

South West Wales used by various public and private sector organisations. Following the borders of the four south-western local authorities

South West Wales is one of the regions of Wales comprising the unitary authorities of Swansea, Neath Port Talbot, Carmarthenshire and Pembrokeshire.

== Definition ==
This definition is used by a number of government agencies and private organisations including:

- BBC
- Welsh Government
- South West Wales Economic Forum (SWWEF)
- South West Wales Integrated Transport Consortium (SWWITCH)
- South West Wales Tourism Partnership (SWWTP)
- Travel About Britain
- West Cheshire & North Wales Chamber of Commerce

A different definition is used in the EU Nomenclature of Territorial Units for Statistics, which refers to South West Wales as a subdivision of West Wales and the Valleys comprising Carmarthenshire, Ceredigion and Pembrokeshire.

== History ==
The area that is now considered to be South West Wales was established as Deheubarth by Hywel Dda in around the year 920. Although not a kingdom per se, it was ruled dynastically and fought over for centuries, until the conquest of Wales by Edward I, completed in 1283, when it was divided into the historic counties that exist today.

== Governance ==
South West Wales is made up of the four principal areas of Carmarthenshire, Neath Port Talbot, Pembrokeshire and Swansea.

The Swansea Bay City Region is a partnership between local authorities, businesses and other organisations.

In April 2021, a South West Wales Corporate Joint Committee was formed to allow the four local councils in the region to collaborate in areas relating to economic well-being, strategic planning and the development of regional transport policies.

== See also ==
- South Wales
- West Wales
- Swansea Bay City Region
- Mid Wales
- North West Wales
