= Mid and West Wales Fire and Rescue Service =

Fire and rescue service in Wales

- Gwasanaeth Tân ac Achub Canolbarth a Gorllewin Cymru (Welsh)

Operational area
- Country: Wales
- Region: Mid & West Wales

Agency overview
- Established: 1996
- Employees: 1,400
- Chief Fire Officer: Craig Flannery

Facilities and equipment
- Stations: 58

Website
- www.mawwfire.gov.uk

The Mid and West Wales Fire and Rescue Service (Welsh: Gwasanaeth Tân ac Achub Canolbarth a Gorllewin Cymru) is the fire and rescue service covering the Welsh principal areas of Carmarthenshire, Ceredigion, Neath Port Talbot, Pembrokeshire, Powys and Swansea.

== History ==
The service was created in 1996 by the Local Government (Wales) Act 1994 which reformed Welsh local government. It was created by a merger of the earlier Dyfed, Powys and West Glamorgan fire brigades.

Since October 2017, the service has shared its control room with South Wales Fire and Rescue Service and South Wales Police at the police headquarters, an arrangement that is expected to save £1 million annually across both fire and rescue services.

== Coverage ==
The Mid and West Wales Fire and Rescue Service is the largest fire service by area in England and Wales, covering a predominantly rural area of 4,500 square miles (11,700 km^{2}) and the third largest in the United Kingdom after the Scottish and Northern Ireland fire services. It has 57 fire stations, and around 1,400 staff.

The fire authority which administers the service is a joint-board, made up of councillors appointed from Carmarthenshire, Ceredigion, Neath Port Talbot, Pembrokeshire, Powys and Swansea councils.

=== Volunteer station ===
The service has a volunteer fire station (Borth Volunteer Fire Unit) under Ceredigion Command.

== See also ==
- List of British firefighters killed in the line of duty
