= Mid Wales =

Geographic region of Wales

Coordinates: 52°24′N 3°30′W

Map of a common definition of Mid Wales following the boundaries of Ceredigion and Powys (in Red), with Meirionnydd (part of Gwynedd), sometimes considered Mid Wales and coloured in pale red

Two principal areas of Wales commonly defined to be Mid Wales, for regional economy

Mid Wales (Welsh: Canolbarth Cymru or simply Y Canolbarth, meaning "the midlands"), or Central Wales, is a region of Wales, encompassing its midlands, in-between North Wales and South Wales. The Mid Wales Regional Committee of the Senedd covered the unitary authority areas of Ceredigion and Powys and the area of Gwynedd that had previously been the district of Meirionnydd. A similar definition is used by the BBC. The Wales Spatial Plan defines a region known as "Central Wales" which covers Ceredigion and Powys.

Mid Wales is dominated by the Cambrian Mountains, including the Green Desert of Wales. The region is sparsely populated, with an economy dependent on farming and small businesses.

== Major settlements ==
- Aberaeron
- Aberdyfi
- Aberporth
- Aberystwyth
- Bala
- Barmouth
- Borth
- Brecon
- Builth Wells
- Caersws
- Cardigan
- Crickhowell
- Dolgellau
- Fairbourne
- Harlech
- Hay-on-Wye
- Knighton
- Lampeter
- Llandrindod Wells
- Llandysul
- Llanidloes
- Llanwrtyd
- Machynlleth
- Montgomery
- New Quay
- Newcastle Emlyn
- Newtown
- Rhayader
- Tregaron
- Tywyn
- Welshpool
- Ystradgynlais

== Railway lines ==
=== Main lines ===
- Heart of Wales line
- Cambrian Line
- Welsh Marches line

=== Heritage lines ===
- Talyllyn Railway
- Welshpool & Llanfair Light Railway
- Vale of Rheidol Railway
- Cambrian Heritage Railways
- Brecon Mountain Railway
- Fairbourne Railway
- Corris Railway

== Politics ==
The parliamentary constituencies used for the UK Parliament in Mid Wales are Brecon, Radnor and Cwm Tawe, Ceredigion Preseli, Montgomeryshire and Glyndŵr and parts of Dwyfor Meirionnydd

The region is represented in the Senedd within an electoral region known as Mid and West Wales. This includes Senedd constituencies such as Brecon and Radnorshire, Ceredigion, Dwyfor Meirionnydd, and Montgomeryshire.

In April 2021, a Mid Wales Corporate Joint Committee was formed to allow the two local councils in the region to collaborate in areas relating to economic well-being, strategic planning and the development of regional transport policies.

== Mid Wales Growth Deal ==
On 13 January 2022, the Mid Wales Growth Deal's Final Deal Agreement was signed between the Growing Mid Wales Board; containing representatives from Ceredigion County Council and Powys County Council, and the UK and Welsh Governments. The deal involves the commitment of £110 million of funding from the two governments, with additional funding provided by other public and private sectors over the span of 10 years. The deal aims to increase investment in the region to £400 million by 2032, support an increase in gross value added of between £570 million and £700 million in the region's economy, and create between 1,100 and 1,400 jobs in Mid Wales.

== See also ==
- Breconshire
- Geography of Wales
- Geology of Wales
- Mid Wales Football League
- Montgomery, Powys
- Montgomeryshire
- North Wales
- Radnorshire
- South Wales
- West Wales
