= South West Wales Integrated Transport Consortium =

Regional Transport Consortium for South West Wales

The South West Wales Integrated Transport Consortium (SWWITCH) is an alliance of four unitary authorities in south west Wales: Pembrokeshire, Swansea, Neath Port Talbot and Carmarthenshire. It is one of four transport consortia (SEWTA, SWWITCH, Taith Joint Board and TraCC) supported by the Welsh Government.

SWWITCH was founded in 1998, in response to the perceived success of South Wales Integrated Fast Transit (SWIFT) and Transport Integration in the Gwent Economic Region (TIGER).

== Ministerial Advisory Group "Phase Two Report on Transport" (July 2009) ==
The future of SWWITCH and the other Regional Transport Consortiums in Wales was called into question by the Ministerial Advisory Group Report of July 2009. This Group, appointed by and reporting to the Deputy First Minister and Transport Minister Ieuan Wyn Jones stated that "The organisational arrangements for transport are unnecessarily complicated and the regional transport consortia represent an unnecessary tier in the structure." (Report summary).(http://wales.gov.uk/docs/det/publications/090715ministerialadvisorygroupphase2reportontransport.pdf). The report was not accepted initially but operational funding was withdrawn from the regional transport consortiums effective April 2014. All public transport functions reverted to the county authorities.
