= National park authority =

UK authority that manages a national park

A national park authority is a special term used in Great Britain for legal bodies charged with maintaining a national park of which, as of October 2021, there are ten in England, three in Wales and two in Scotland. The powers and duties of all such authorities are similar, but their work varies depending on where they are situated.

National park authorities were set up by the Environment Act 1995.

== Role ==
The primary purpose of the national park authorities set out in law is to foster the economic and social wellbeing of the communities within the park.

The national park authorities are the local planning authority for the park. The district-level council normally takes on that role outside the national parks.

== Composition ==
The makeup of the park authorities is decided by central government. Half of the members are normally from the local authorities whose areas are within the park, and the other half are appointed directly by the Minister. The ministerial appointees may be from parish councils or persons with expertise relevant to the park.

== List of national park authorities ==
=== England ===
- Peak District National Park Authority
- Lake District National Park Authority
- Dartmoor National Park Authority
- North York Moors National Park Authority
- Yorkshire Dales National Park Authority
- Exmoor National Park Authority
- Northumberland National Park Authority
- Broads Authority
- New Forest National Park Authority
- South Downs National Park Authority

=== Wales ===
- Eryri National Park Authority
- Pembrokeshire Coast National Park Authority
- Bannau Brycheiniog National Park Authority

=== Scotland ===
- Loch Lomond and The Trossachs National Park Authority
- Cairngorms National Park Authority

== See also ==
- National parks of the United Kingdom
- Association of National Park Authorities
