= Geography of the United Kingdom =

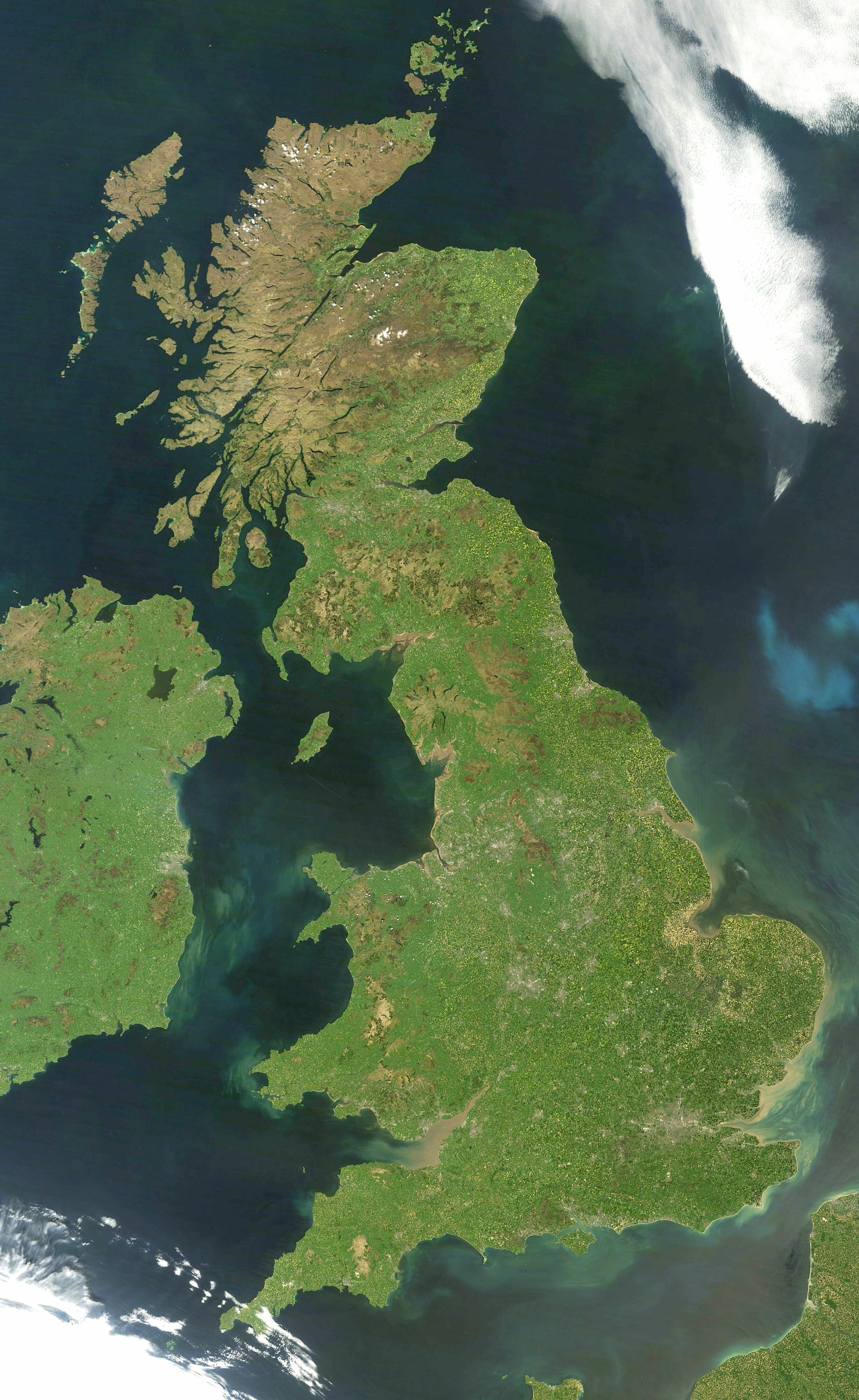
- Continent: Europe
- Region: Northwestern Europe
- Coordinates: 54°0′N 2°30′W
- Area: Ranked 78th
  - Total: 244,376 km^{2} (94,354 sq mi)
  - Land: 99.3%
  - Water: 0.7%
- Coastline: 12,429 km (7,723 mi)
- Borders: 499 km (310 mi) land border with Republic of Ireland
- Highest point: Ben Nevis 1,345 m (4,413 ft)
- Lowest point: The Fens −4 m (−13 ft)
- Longest river: River Severn 354 km (220 mi)
- Largest lake: Lough Neagh 392 km^{2} (151 sq mi)
- Climate: Temperate, with some areas of Scotland being Tundra, and Subarctic
- Terrain: Mountainous area to the north and west, lowland area to the south and east.
- Natural resources: Coal, oil (continental shelf of the North Sea), natural gas, tin, limestone, iron, salt, clay, lead
- Natural hazards: Storms, floods
- Environmental issues: Biodiversity loss, sulphur dioxide emissions from power plants, some rivers are contaminated by agricultural waste, wastewater into the sea
- Exclusive economic zone: In Europe: 773,676 km^{2} (298,718 mi^{2}); All overseas territories: 6,805,586 km^{2} (2,627,651 mi^{2})

References
- (Note: ONS Standard Area Measurement, 'area to mean high water'. Excludes the three Crown Dependencies (768 km^{2} or 297 sq mi) and the 14 overseas territories (1,742,857 km^{2} or 672,921 sq mi).)

The United Kingdom is a country located off the north-western coast of continental Europe. It comprises England, Scotland, Wales and Northern Ireland. With a total area of approximately 244,376 square kilometres (94,354 sq mi), the UK occupies the major part of the British Isles archipelago and includes the island of Great Britain, the north-eastern one-sixth of the island of Ireland and many smaller surrounding islands. It is the world's 7th largest island country. The mainland areas lie between latitudes 49°N and 59°N (the Shetland Islands reach to nearly 61°N), and longitudes 8°W to 2°E. The Royal Observatory, Greenwich, in south-east London, is the defining point of the Prime Meridian.

The UK lies between the North Atlantic and the North Sea, and comes within 35 km (22 mi) of the north-west coast of France, from which it is separated by the English Channel. It shares a 499 km (310 mi) international land boundary with the Republic of Ireland. The Channel Tunnel bored beneath the English Channel now links the UK with France.

The British Overseas Territories and Crown Dependencies are covered in their own respective articles (see below).

== Area ==
The total area of the United Kingdom according to the Office for National Statistics is 244,376 square kilometres (94,354 sq mi), comprising the island of Great Britain, the northeastern one-sixth of the island of Ireland (Northern Ireland) and many smaller islands. This makes it the 7th largest island country in the world. England is the largest country of the United Kingdom, at 130,462 square kilometres (50,372 sq mi) accounting for just over half the total area of the UK. Scotland at 78,801 square kilometres (30,425 sq mi), is second largest, accounting for about a third of the area of the UK. Wales and Northern Ireland are much smaller, covering 20,783 and 14,330 square kilometres (8,024 and 5,533 sq mi) respectively.

The area of the countries of the United Kingdom is set out in the table below. Information about the area of England, the largest country, is also broken down by region.

Rank	Name	Area
1	England ∟ South West ∟ East of England ∟ South East ∟ East Midlands ∟ Yorkshire and the Humber ∟ North West ∟ West Midlands ∟ North East ∟ London	132,938 km^{2} 23,837 km^{2} 19,120 km^{2} 19,096 km^{2} 15,627 km^{2} 15,420 km^{2} 14,165 km^{2} 12,998 km^{2} 8,592 km^{2} 1,572 km^{2}
2	Scotland	80,239 km^{2}
3	Wales	21,225 km^{2}
4	Northern Ireland	14,130 km^{2}
	United Kingdom	248,532 km^{2}
	Overseas territories	1,727,570 km^{2}

The British Antarctic Territory, which covers an area of 1,709,400 km^{2} (660,000 sq mi) is geographically the largest of the British Overseas Territories followed by the Falkland Islands which covers an area of 12,173 km^{2} (4,700 sq mi). The remaining twelve overseas territories cover an area 5,997 km^{2} (2,315 sq mi).

Other countries with very similar land areas to the United Kingdom include Guinea (slightly larger), Uganda, Ghana and Romania (all slightly smaller). The UK is the world's 80th largest country by land area and the 10th largest in Europe (if European Russia is included).

== Physical geography ==
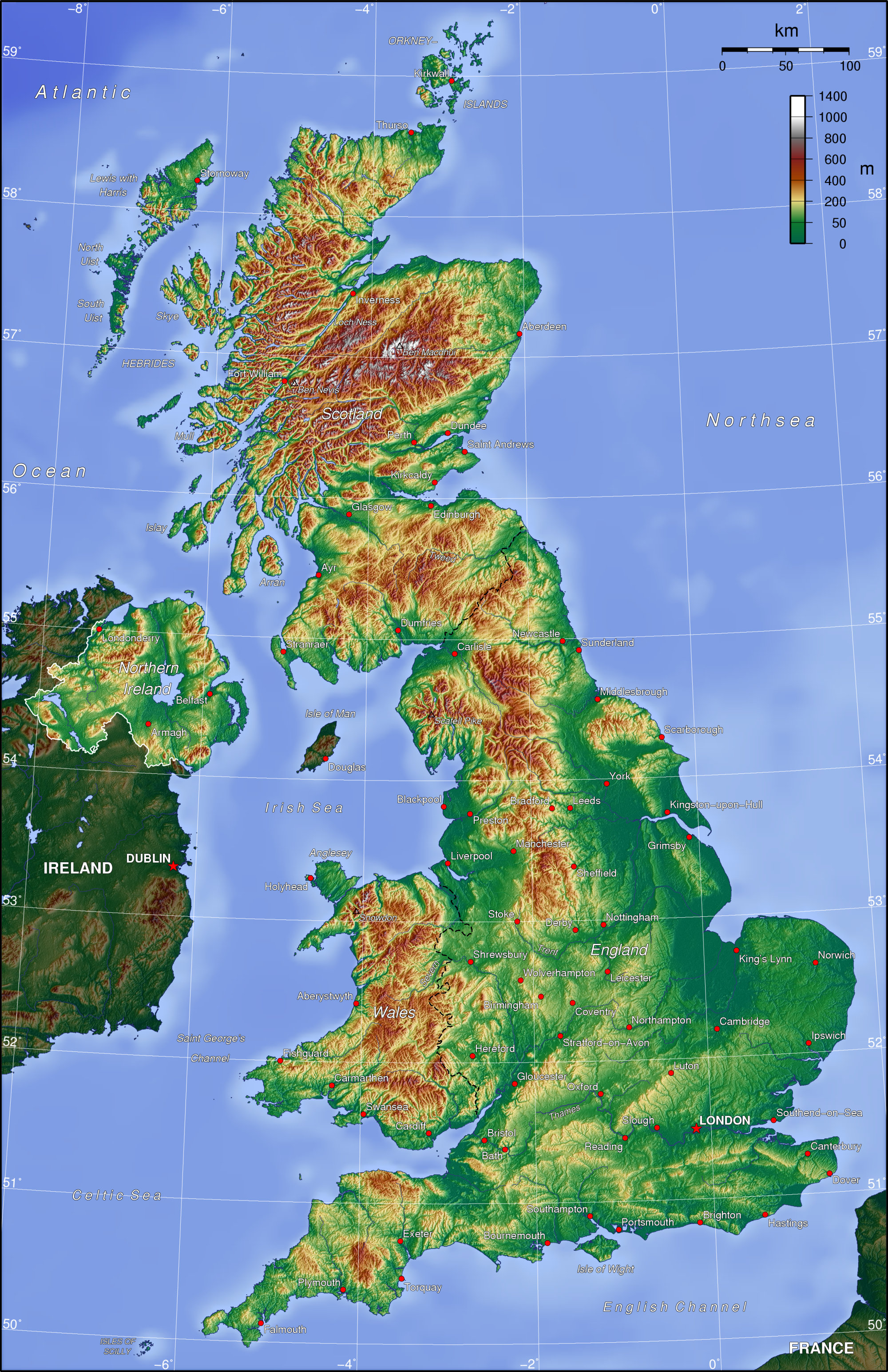
UK's topography

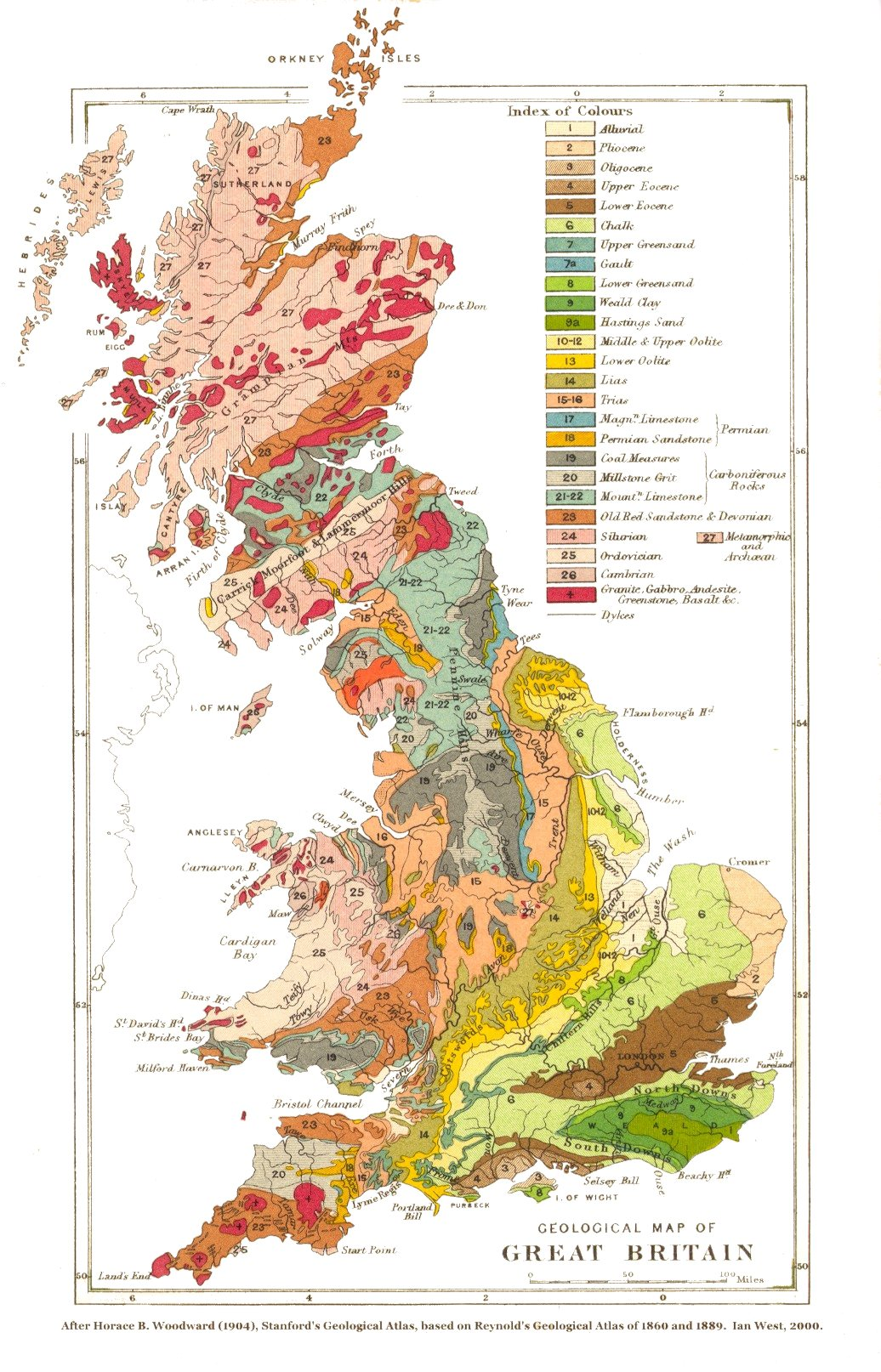
As this geological map of Great Britain demonstrates, the geology of the UK is varied and complex.

The physical geography of the UK varies greatly. England consists of mostly lowland terrain, with upland or mountainous terrain only found north-west of the Tees–Exe line. The upland areas include the Lake District, the Pennines, North York Moors, Exmoor and Dartmoor. The lowland areas are typically traversed by ranges of low hills, frequently composed of chalk, and flat plains. Scotland is the most mountainous country in the UK and its physical geography is distinguished by the Highland Boundary Fault which traverses the Scottish mainland from Helensburgh to Stonehaven. The faultline separates the two distinctively different regions of the Highlands to the north and west, and the Lowlands to the south and east. The Highlands are predominantly mountainous, containing the majority of Scotland's mountainous landscape, while the Lowlands contain flatter land, especially across the Central Lowlands, with upland and mountainous terrain located at the Southern Uplands. Wales is mostly mountainous, though south Wales is less mountainous than north and mid Wales. Northern Ireland consists of mostly hilly landscape and its geography includes the Mourne Mountains as well as Lough Neagh, at 388 square kilometres (150 sq mi), the largest body of water in the UK.

The overall geomorphology of the UK was shaped by a combination of forces including tectonics and climate change, in particular glaciation in northern and western areas.

The tallest mountain in the UK (and British Isles) is Ben Nevis, in the Grampian Mountains, Scotland. The longest river is the River Severn which flows from Wales into England. The largest lake by surface area is Lough Neagh in Northern Ireland, though Scotland's Loch Ness has the largest volume.

=== Geology ===
The geology of the UK is complex and diverse, a result of it being subject to a variety of plate tectonic processes over a very extended period of time. Changing latitude and sea levels have been important factors in the nature of sedimentary sequences, whilst successive continental collisions have affected its geological structure with major faulting and folding being a legacy of each orogeny (mountain-building period), often associated with volcanic activity and the metamorphism of existing rock sequences. As a result of this eventful geological history, the UK shows a rich variety of landscapes.

==== Precambrian ====
The oldest rocks in the British Isles are the Lewisian gneisses, metamorphic rocks found in the far north-west of Scotland and in the Hebrides (with a few small outcrops elsewhere), which date from at least 2,700 Ma (Ma = million years ago). South and east of the gneisses are a complex mixture of rocks forming the North West Highlands and Grampian Highlands in Scotland. These are essentially the remains of folded sedimentary rocks that were deposited between 1,000 Ma and 670 Ma over the gneiss on what was then the floor of the Iapetus Ocean.

==== Paleozoic ====
At 520 Ma, what is now Great Britain was split between two continents; the north of Scotland was located on the continent of Laurentia at about 20° south of the equator, while the rest of the country was on the continent of Gondwana near the Antarctic Circle. In Gondwana, England and Wales were largely submerged under a shallow sea studded with volcanic islands. The remains of these islands underlie much of central England with small outcrops visible in many places.

About 500 Ma southern Britain, the east coast of North America and south-east Newfoundland broke away from Gondwana to form the continent of Avalonia, which by 440 Ma had drifted to about 30° south. During this period north Wales was subject to volcanic activity. The remains of these volcanoes are still visible, one example of which is Rhobell Fawr dating from 510 Ma. Large quantities of volcanic lava and ash known as the Borrowdale Volcanics covered the Lake District and this can still be seen in the form of mountains such as Helvellyn and Scafell Pike.

Between 425 and 400 Ma Avalonia had joined with the continent of Baltica, and the combined landmass collided with Laurentia at about 20° south, joining the southern and northern halves of Great Britain together. The resulting Caledonian Orogeny produced an Alpine-style mountain range in much of north and west Britain.

The collision between continents continued during the Devonian period, producing uplift and subsequent erosion, resulting in the deposition of numerous sedimentary rock layers in lowlands and seas. The Old Red Sandstone and the contemporary volcanics and marine sediments found in Devon originated from these processes.

Around 360 Ma Great Britain was lying at the equator, covered by the warm shallow waters of the Rheic Ocean, during which time the Carboniferous Limestone was deposited, as found in the Mendip Hills and the Peak District of Derbyshire. Later, river deltas formed and the sediments deposited were colonised by swamps and rain forest. It was in this environment that the Coal Measures were formed, the source of the majority of Britain's extensive coal reserves.

Around 280 Ma the Variscan orogeny mountain-building period occurred, again due to collision of continental plates, causing major deformation in south-west England. The general region of Variscan folding was south of an east–west line roughly from south Pembrokeshire to Kent. Towards the end of this period granite was formed beneath the overlying rocks of Devon and Cornwall, now exposed at Dartmoor and Bodmin Moor.

By the end of the Carboniferous period the various continents of the Earth had fused to form the super-continent of Pangaea. Britain was located in the interior of Pangea where it was subject to a hot arid desert climate with frequent flash floods leaving deposits that formed beds of red sedimentary rock.

==== Mesozoic ====
As Pangaea drifted during the Triassic, Great Britain moved away from the equator until it was between 20° and 30° north. The remnants of the Variscan uplands in France to the south were eroded down, resulting in layers of the New Red Sandstone being deposited across central England.

Pangaea began to break up at the start of the Jurassic period. Sea levels rose and Britain drifted on the Eurasian Plate to between 31° and 40° north. Much of Britain was under water again, and sedimentary rocks were deposited and can now be found underlying much of England from the Cleveland Hills of Yorkshire to the Jurassic Coast in Dorset. These include sandstones, greensands, oolitic limestone of the Cotswold Hills, corallian limestone of the Vale of White Horse and the Isle of Portland. The burial of algae and bacteria below the mud of the seafloor during this time resulted in the formation of North Sea oil and natural gas.

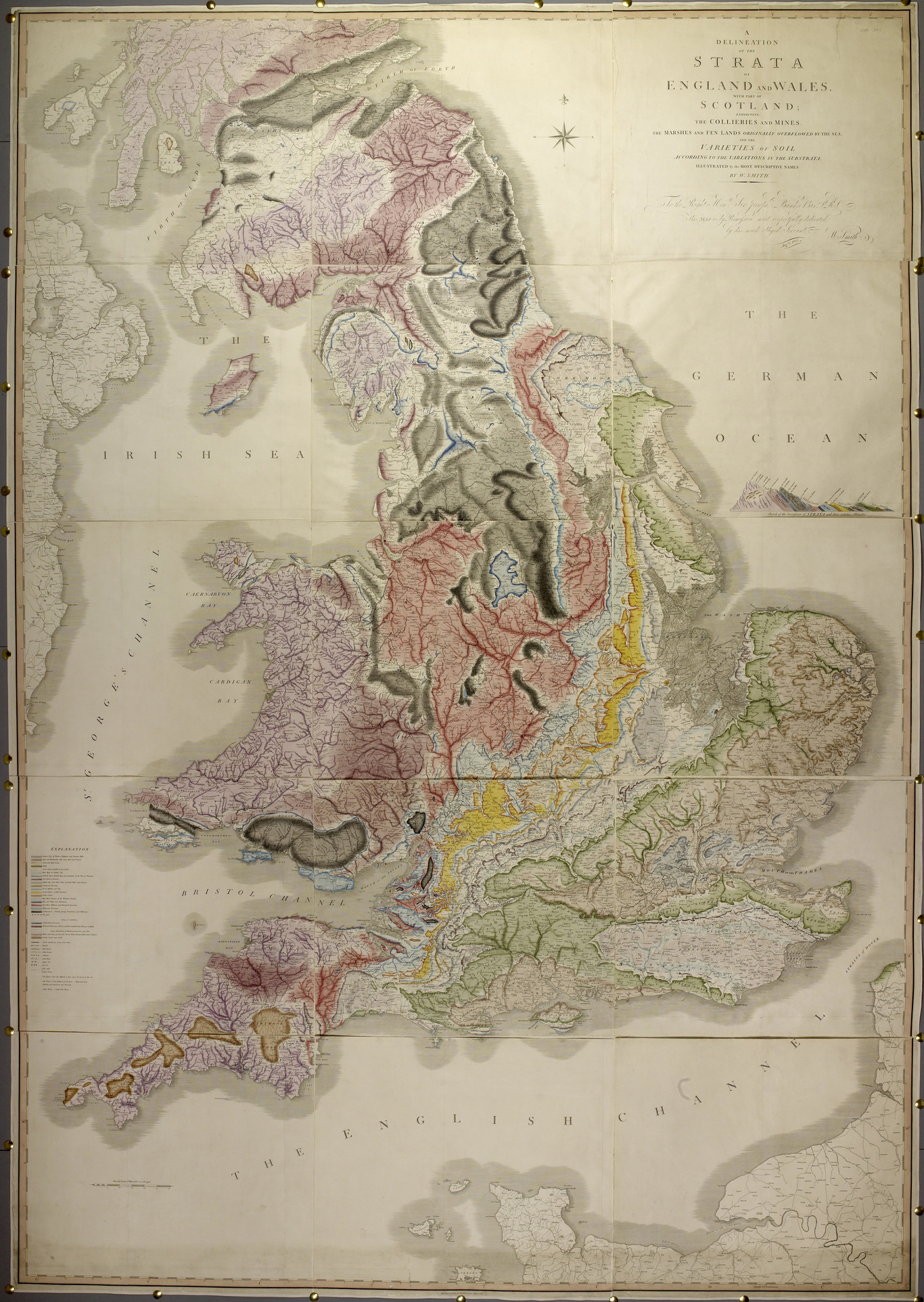
1815 geological by William Smith

The modern continents having formed, the Cretaceous saw the formation of the Atlantic Ocean, gradually separating northern Scotland from North America. The land underwent a series of uplifts to form a fertile plain. After 20 million years or so, the seas started to flood the land again until much of Britain was again below the sea, though sea levels frequently changed. Chalk and flints were deposited over much of Great Britain, now notably exposed at the White Cliffs of Dover and the Seven Sisters, and also forming Salisbury Plain.

==== Cenozoic ====
Between 63 and 52 Ma, the last volcanic rocks in Great Britain were formed. The major eruptions at this time produced the Antrim Plateau, the basaltic columns of the Giant's Causeway and Lundy Island in the Bristol Channel.

The Alpine Orogeny that took place in Europe about 50 Ma, was responsible for the folding of strata in southern England, producing the London Basin syncline, the Weald-Artois Anticline to the south, the North Downs, South Downs and Chiltern Hills.

During the period the North Sea formed, Britain was uplifted. Some of this uplift was along old lines of weakness left from the Caledonian and Variscan Orogenies long before. The uplifted areas were then eroded, and further sediments, such as the London Clay, were deposited over southern England.

The major changes during the last 2 million years were brought about by several recent ice ages. The most severe was the Anglian Glaciation, with ice up to 1,000 m (3,300 ft) thick that reached as far south as London and Bristol. This took place between about 478,000 to 424,000 years ago, and was responsible for the diversion of the River Thames onto its present course. During the most recent Devensian glaciation, which ended a mere 10,000 years ago, the icesheet reached south to Wolverhampton and Cardiff. Among the features left behind by the ice are the fjords of the west coast of Scotland, the U-shaped valleys of the Lake District and erratics (blocks of rock) that have been transported from the Oslo region of Norway and deposited on the coast of Yorkshire.

Amongst the most significant geological features created during the last twelve thousand years are the peat deposits of Scotland, and of coastal and upland areas of England and Wales.

At the present time Scotland is continuing to rise as a result of the weight of Devensian ice being lifted. Southern and eastern England is sinking, generally estimated at 1 mm (1/25 in) per year, with the London area sinking at double the speed partly due to the continuing compaction of the recent clay deposits.

=== Mountains and hills ===
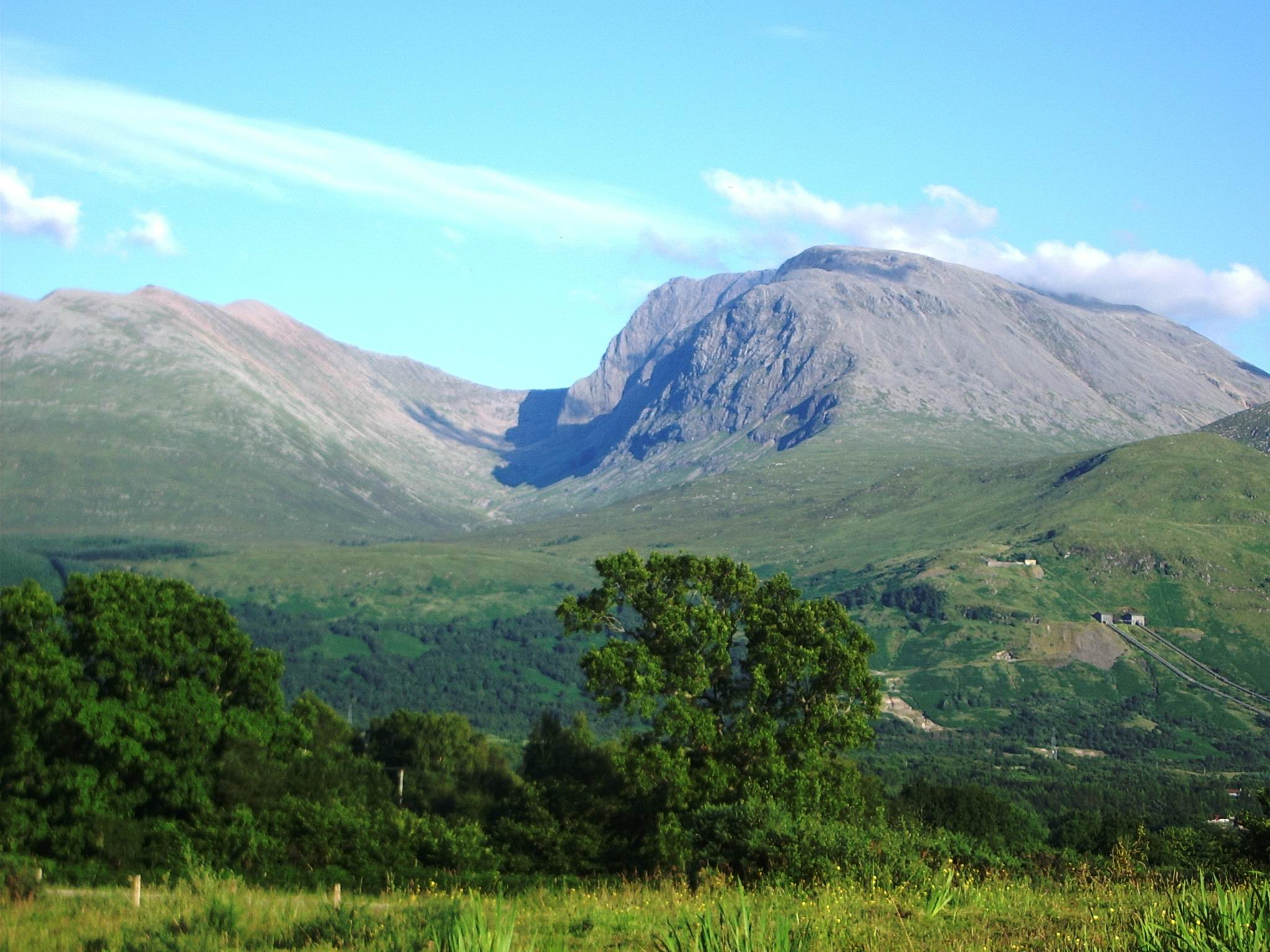
At 1,345 metres (4,413 ft), Ben Nevis is the highest peak in the UK.

The ten tallest mountains in the UK are all found in Scotland. The highest peaks in each part of the UK are:

- Scotland: Ben Nevis, 1,345 metres (4,413 ft)
- Wales: Snowdon (Yr Wyddfa), (Snowdonia), 1,085 metres (3,560 ft)
- England: Scafell Pike (Cumbrian Mountains), 978 metres (3,209 ft)
- Northern Ireland: Slieve Donard (Mourne Mountains), 852 metres (2,795 ft)

The ranges of mountains and hills in the UK include:

- Scotland: Cairngorms, Scottish Highlands, Southern Uplands, Grampian Mountains, Monadhliath Mountains, Ochil Hills, Campsie Fells, Cuillin
- Wales: Brecon Beacons (Bannau Brycheiniog), Cambrian Mountains (Mynyddoedd Cambria), Clwydian Hills (Bryniau Clwyd), Snowdonia (Eryri), Black Mountains (Y Mynyddoedd Duon), Preseli Hills (Y Preseli)
- England: Cheviot Hills, Chilterns, Cotswolds, Dartmoor, Lincolnshire Wolds, Exmoor, Lake District, Malvern Hills, Mendip Hills, North Downs, Peak District, Pennines, South Downs, Shropshire Hills, Yorkshire Wolds
- Northern Ireland: Mourne Mountains, Antrim Plateau, Sperrin Mountains

The lowest point of the UK is in the Fens of East Anglia, in England, parts of which lie up to 4 metres (13 ft) below sea level.

=== Rivers and lakes ===
Main articles

- List of lakes and lochs in the United Kingdom;
- List of rivers of the United Kingdom;
- List of waterfalls of the United Kingdom.

The longest river in the UK is the River Severn (220 mi; 350 km) which flows through both Wales and England.

The longest rivers in the UK contained fully within each of its constituent nations are:

- England: River Thames (215 mi; 346 km)
- Scotland: River Tay (117 mi; 188 km)
- Northern Ireland: River Bann (76 mi; 122 km)
- Wales: River Usk (78 mi; 126 km)

The largest lakes (by surface area) in the UK by country are:

- Northern Ireland: Lough Neagh (147.39 mi^{2}; 381.7 km^{2})
- Scotland: Loch Lomond (27.46 mi^{2}; 71.1 km^{2})
- England: Windermere (5.69 mi^{2}; 14.7 km^{2})
- Wales: Llyn Tegid (Bala Lake) (1.87 mi^{2}; 4.8 km^{2})

The deepest lake in the UK is Loch Morar with a maximum depth of 309 metres (1,014 ft); Loch Ness is second at 228 metres (748 ft) deep. The deepest lake in England is Wastwater which achieves a depth of 79 metres (259 ft).

Loch Ness is the UK's largest lake in terms of volume.

=== Artificial waterways ===
As a result of its industrial history, the United Kingdom has an extensive system of canals, mostly built in the early years of the Industrial Revolution, before the rise of competition from the railways. The United Kingdom also has numerous dams and reservoirs to store water for drinking and industry. The generation of hydroelectric power is rather limited, supplying less than 2% of British electricity, mainly from the Scottish Highlands.

=== Coastline ===
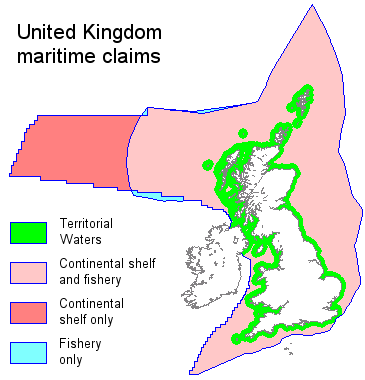
United Kingdom maritime claims

The UK has a coastline which measures about 12,429 km (7,723 mi). The heavy indentation of the coastline helps to ensure that no location is more than 125 km (78 mi) from tidal waters.

The UK claims jurisdiction over the continental shelf, as defined in continental shelf orders or in accordance with agreed upon boundaries, an exclusive fishing zone of 200 nmi (370.4 km; 230.2 mi), and territorial sea of 12 nmi (22.2 km; 13.8 mi).

The UK has an Exclusive Economic Zone of 773,676 km^{2} (298,718 mi^{2}) in Europe. However, if all crown dependencies and overseas territories are included then the total EEZ is 6,805,586 km^{2} (2,627,651 mi^{2}) which is the 5th largest in the world.

==== Inlets ====
- Cardigan Bay
- Lyme Bay
- Bristol Channel
- Thames Estuary
- Morecambe Bay
- Solway Firth
- The Wash
- Humber Estuary
- Firth of Forth
- Firth of Tay
- Moray Firth
- Firth of Clyde
- Firth of Lorn

==== Headlands ====
The geology of the United Kingdom is such that there are many headlands along its coast. A list of headlands of the United Kingdom details many of them.

=== Tidal flats ===
A recent global remote sensing analysis suggested that there were 2,697 km^{2} (1,041 sq mi) of tidal flats in the United Kingdom, making it the 12th ranking country in terms of how much tidal flat occurs there.

=== Islands ===
In total, it is estimated that the UK is made up of over one thousand small islands, the majority located off the north and west coasts of Scotland. About 130 of these are inhabited according to the 2001 census.

The largest island in the UK is Great Britain. The largest islands by constituent country are Lewis and Harris in Scotland at 841 sq mi (2,180 km^{2}), Wales' Anglesey at 276 sq mi (710 km^{2}), the Isle of Wight in England at 147 sq mi (380 km^{2}), and Rathlin Island in Northern Ireland at roughly 6 sq mi (16 km^{2});

=== Climate ===
The climate of the UK is generally temperate, although significant local variation occurs, particularly as a result of altitude and distance from the coast. In general the south of the country is warmer than the north, and the west wetter than the east. Due to the warming influence of the Gulf Stream, the UK is significantly warmer than some other locations at a similar latitude, such as Newfoundland.

The prevailing winds are southwesterly, from the North Atlantic Current. More than 50% of the days are overcast. There are few natural hazards, although there can be strong winds and floods, especially in winter.

Average annual rainfall varies from over 3,000 mm (118.1 in) in the Scottish Highlands down to 553 mm (21.8 in) in Cambridge. The county of Essex is one of the driest in the UK, with an average annual rainfall of around 600 mm (23.6 in), although it typically rains on over 100 days per year. In some years rainfall in Essex can be below 450 mm (17.7 in), less than the average annual rainfall in Jerusalem and Beirut.

The highest temperature recorded in the UK was 40.3 °C (104.5 °F) at Coningsby in Lincolnshire, on 20 July 2022. The lowest was −27.2 °C (−17.0 °F) recorded at Braemar in the Grampian Mountains, Scotland, on 11 February 1895 and 10 January 1982 and Altnaharra, also in Scotland, on 30 December 1995.

== Human geography ==
Largest cities or towns in the United Kingdom (England and Wales: 2011 census built-up area; Scotland: 2016 estimates settlement; Northern Ireland: 2001 census urban area)
Rank	Name	Urban area	Pop.	Rank	Name	Urban area	Pop.
1	London	Greater London	9,787,426	11	Bristol	Bristol	617,280
2	Manchester	Greater Manchester	2,553,379	12	Edinburgh	Edinburgh	512,150
3	Birmingham	West Midlands	2,440,986	13	Leicester	Leicester	508,916
4	Leeds	West Yorkshire	1,777,934	14	Belfast	Belfast	483,418
5	Glasgow	Greater Glasgow	985,290	15	Brighton	Brighton & Hove	474,485
6	Liverpool	Liverpool	864,122	16	Bournemouth	South East Dorset	466,266
7	Southampton	South Hampshire	855,569	17	Cardiff	Cardiff	390,214
8	Newcastle upon Tyne	Tyneside	774,891	18	Middlesbrough	Teesside	376,633
9	Nottingham	Nottingham	729,977	19	Stoke-on-Trent	Stoke-on-Trent	372,775
10	Sheffield	Sheffield	685,368	20	Coventry	Coventry	359,262

=== Political geography ===
The United Kingdom is made up of four countries: England, Northern Ireland, Scotland and Wales.

==== Government ====
The United Kingdom as a whole is governed by the Parliament of the United Kingdom. The Parliament of the United Kingdom, based at the Palace of Westminster in London, only legislates for Scotland, Wales and Northern Ireland on reserved matters, such as national security, broadcasting and currency, as Scotland, Wales and Northern Ireland have devolved governments and legislatures – the Scottish Parliament, Senedd (Welsh Parliament) and Northern Ireland Assembly respectively. The devolved governments and legislatures can make laws in a number of areas, such as culture, education

The Scottish Parliament has been described as "one of the most powerful devolved parliaments in the world", and can legislate for Scotland in areas in which the Northern Ireland Assembly or Welsh Parliament cannot for their respective countries, such as in areas as the distribution of money from dormant bank accounts, policing, criminal investigations and private security, anti-social behaviour and public order, air gun licensing, consumer advocacy and advice, Pubs Code Regulations, Sunday trading, heating and cooling, policing of railways and railway property, public sector compensation, the Crown Estate, registration of births, deaths and places of worship, Registration of land, agricultural charges and debentures, bank holidays and marriage, family relationships, matters concerning children.

By contrast, England has no devolved system of government, that is, the Parliament of the United Kingdom makes laws for England, as well as for reserved matters in Northern Ireland, Scotland and Wales. England is governed by UK government ministers and legislated for by the UK parliament. The London region has a devolved assembly but proposals for elected Regional Assemblies in England were rejected in the first referendum covering North East England. (See Government of England.)

The UK (specifically, Northern Ireland) has an international land boundary with the Republic of Ireland of 499 km. There is also a boundary between the jurisdiction of France and the UK on the Channel Tunnel.

==== Local government ====
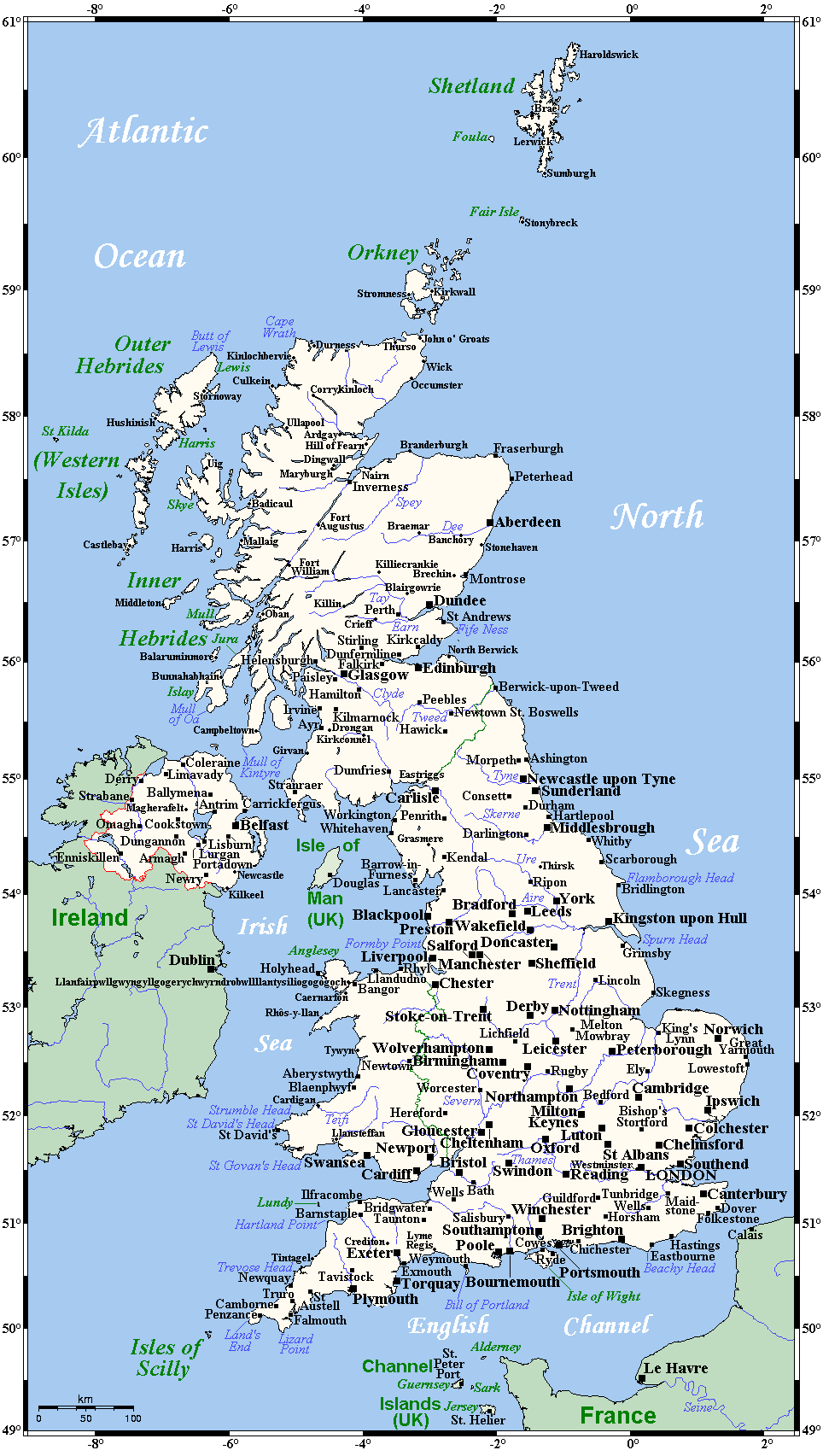
The United Kingdom's cities, other large centres, and selected smaller places

Each part of the UK is subdivided into further local governmental regions:

- England: Unitary Authorities, county councils, district councils, parish councils
- Wales: Principal areas, communities
- Scotland: Council areas, communities
- Northern Ireland: Districts

Historically the UK was divided into counties or shires: administrative areas through which all civil responsibilities of the government were passed. Each county or shire had a county town as its administrative centre Between 1889 (1890 in Scotland) and 1974, the political boundaries were based on the traditional counties, but due to changes in population centres, the traditional counties became impractical as local government areas in certain highly urbanised areas. The Local Government Act 1972 created a new system of administrative counties, designed to take account of the widely differing populations across different parts of the country.

In the 1990s further population growth led to more political changes on a local level. Unitary authorities were formed across the entirety of Scotland and Wales, and in larger cities in England. Many unpopular administrative counties were also abolished at this time, leading to a mixture of two-tier and single-purpose authorities. Further reorganisations are planned if and when regional assemblies in England are revisited in the future.

=== Economic geography ===
The economic geography of the UK reflects not only its current position in the global economy, but its long history both as a trading nation and an imperial power.

The UK led the Industrial Revolution and its highly urban character is a legacy of this, with all its major cities being current or former centres of various forms of manufacturing. However, this in turn was built on its exploitation of natural resources, especially coal and iron ore.

==== Primary industry ====
The UK's primary industry was once dominated by the coal industry, heavily concentrated in the north, the Midlands and south Wales. This is all but gone and the major primary industry is North Sea oil. Its activity is concentrated on the UK Continental Shelf to the north-east of Scotland.

==== Manufacturing ====
The UK's heavy manufacturing drove the industrial revolution. A map of the major UK cities gives a good picture of where this activity occurred, in particular Belfast, Birmingham, Glasgow, Liverpool, London, Manchester, Newcastle and Sheffield. Today there is no heavy manufacturing industry in which UK-based firms can be considered world leaders. However, areas of the UK still have a notable manufacturing base, including the Midlands which remains a strong manufacturing centre, and the North West which accounts for 60% of the United Kingdom's manufacturing output. More recently, high technology firms have concentrated largely along the M4 motorway, partly because of access to Heathrow Airport, but also because of agglomeration economies.

==== Finance and services ====
Once, every large city had a stock exchange. Now, the UK financial industry is concentrated overwhelmingly in the City of London and Canary Wharf, with back office and administrative operations often dispersed around the south of England. London is one of the world's great financial centres and is usually referred to as a world city. There is also a significant legal and ebusiness industry in Leeds.

==== Regional disparity ====
The effect of changing economic fortune has contributed to the creation of the so-called North–south divide, in which decaying industrial and ex-industrial areas of Northern England, Scotland and Wales contrast with the wealthy, finance and technology-led southern economy. This has led successive governments to develop regional policy to try to rectify the imbalance. However, this is not to say that the north–south divide is uniform; some of the worst pockets of deprivation can be found in London, whilst parts of Cheshire and North Yorkshire are very wealthy. Nor is the North–south divide limited to the economic sphere; cultural and political divisions weigh heavily too.

== Natural resources ==
=== Agriculture ===
Agriculture in the UK is intensive, highly mechanized, and efficient by European standards. It produces approximately 60% of the nation's food needs while employing about 1.4% of the labor force. In 2023, the agricultural sector contributed £13.7 billion to the UK economy, with England accounting for 73% of this output. The sector's workforce totaled 462,100 individuals, distributed as follows: 63% in England, 14% in Scotland, and 11% each in Northern Ireland and Wales.

The distribution of agricultural production value in 2023 was as follows:

- Livestock: 62% (£19.2 billion), with dairy (£6.0 billion) and beef (£3.9 billion) being the largest contributors.
- Crops: 38% (£12.0 billion), with cereals (£4.4 billion) and vegetables/flowers (£3.5 billion) leading the category.

=== Energy resources ===
The UK possesses a variety of geological resources, including coal, petroleum, natural gas, limestone, chalk, gypsum, silica, rock salt, china clay, iron ore, tin, silver, gold, and lead. Historically, these resources have underpinned the nation's industrial development. However, the contribution of primary energy production to the UK's GDP has seen a decline over the decades. In 2023, the energy to GDP ratio was 73 metric tons of oil equivalent per million British pounds, reflecting a decrease in energy production's share of the economy.

=== Renewable energy potential ===
Given its extensive coastline, the UK has significant potential for generating electricity from wave and tidal energy. Studies estimate that tidal stream energy could provide up to 11% of the UK's electricity demand, representing an installed capacity of 11.5 GW and contributing up to £17 billion to the economy by 2050. Additionally, the UK's wave energy potential is substantial, with an average wave energy density of 32.5 kilowatts per meter along its 12,429 km coastline. The theoretical annual wave energy potential is estimated at 3,538 terawatt-hours, which is approximately 11 times the nation's current electricity consumption.

Despite this potential, as of 2022, marine energy (including wave and tidal) contributed only 11 gigawatt-hours to the UK's electricity generation. This indicates that while the resources are abundant, their commercial exploitation remains limited.

Efforts are ongoing to harness these renewable energy sources. For instance, the Severn Estuary Commission has recommended the development of tidal energy lagoons to boost economic growth and provide renewable energy, emphasizing the need for government support to initiate such projects.

== Environment ==
=== Current issues ===
England is one of the most densely populated countries/regions in the world, and the most densely populated major nation in Europe. The high population density (especially in the southeast of England) coupled with a changing climate, is likely to put extreme pressure on the United Kingdom's water resources in the future.

The United Kingdom is reducing greenhouse gas emissions. It has met Kyoto Protocol target of a 12.5% reduction from 1999 levels and intends to meet the legally binding target of a 20% cut in emissions by 2010. By 2015, to recycle or compost at least 33% of household waste. Between 1998-99 and 1999–2000, household recycling increased from 8.8% to 10.3% respectively.

According to a 2018 survey for the World Wide Fund for Nature, the United Kingdom is one of the most nature-depleted countries in the world, coming in 189th place out of 218 countries.

=== International agreements ===
The United Kingdom is a party to many international agreements, including: Air Pollution, Air Pollution-Nitrogen Oxides, Air Pollution-Sulphur 94, Air Pollution-Volatile Organic Compounds, Antarctic-Environmental Protocol, Antarctic-Marine Living Resources, Antarctic Seals, Antarctic Treaty, Biodiversity, Climate Change, Climate Change-Kyoto Protocol, Desertification, Endangered Species, Environmental Modification, Hazardous Wastes, Law of the Sea, Marine Dumping, Marine Life Conservation, Nuclear Test Ban, Ozone Layer Protection, Ship Pollution, Tropical Timber 83, Tropical Timber 94, Wetlands and Whaling.

The UK has signed, but not ratified, the international agreement on Air Pollution-Persistent Organic Pollutants.

== Geography of dependent territories ==
Map of the UK, overseas territories and crown dependencies at the same geographic scale

=== Crown dependencies ===
- Geography of the Isle of Man
- Geography of the Channel Islands
  - Geography of Jersey
  - Geography of Guernsey
  - Geography of Alderney
  - Geography of Sark
  - Geography of Herm

=== Overseas territories ===
- Geography of Anguilla
- Geography of Bermuda
- Geography of the British Antarctic Territory
- Geography of the British Indian Ocean Territory
- Geography of the British Virgin Islands
- Geography of the Cayman Islands
- Geography of the Falkland Islands
- Geography of Gibraltar
- Geography of Montserrat
- Geography of the Pitcairn Islands
- Geography of Saint Helena, Ascension and Tristan da Cunha
- Geography of South Georgia and the South Sandwich Islands
- Geography of Akrotiri and Dhekelia
- Geography of the Turks and Caicos Islands

== See also ==
- British Overseas Territories
- Crown Dependencies
- City status in the United Kingdom
- Conservation in the United Kingdom
- Demographics of the United Kingdom
- Extreme points of the United Kingdom
- Centre points of the United Kingdom
- Geography of England
- Geography of Europe
- Geography of Ireland
- Geography of Scotland
- Geography of Wales
- List of caves in the United Kingdom
- List of conurbations in the United Kingdom
- List of places in the United Kingdom
- North–south divide in the United Kingdom
- Towns of the United Kingdom
- Transport in the United Kingdom
  - Rail transport in the United Kingdom
