= Geography of England =

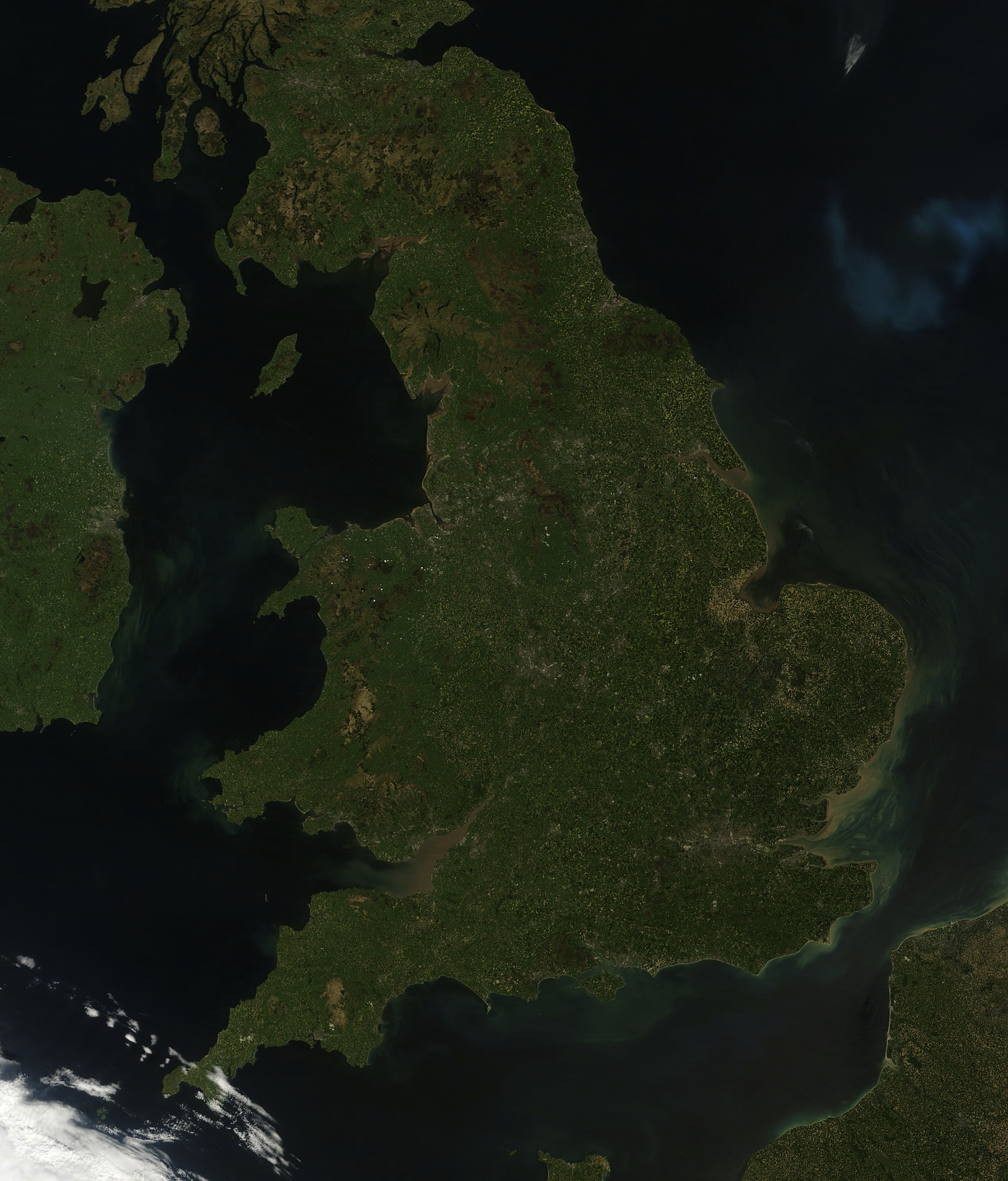
- Satellite image including England
- Continent: Europe
- Region: British Isles
- Area
  - Total: 132,932 km^{2} (51,325 sq mi)
- Coastline: 3,200 km (2,000 mi)
- Borders: Scotland 96 km (60 mi); Wales 257 km (160 mi)
- Highest point: Scafell Pike; 978 m (3,209 ft)
- Lowest point: Holme Fen, −2.75 m (−9 ft)
- Longest river: River Severn (shared with Wales); 354 km (220 mi); Longest river entirely within England is the River Thames. 346 km (215 mi)
- Largest lake: Windermere; 14.73 km^{2} (5.69 sq mi)
- Climate: Oceanic "British" climate with small areas of Subarctic climate
- Terrain: Mostly low hills and plains, especially in the south, Midlands and east. Upland or mountainous terrain prevails in the north and parts of the west.
- Natural resources: Iron, zinc, potash, silica sand, fish, timber, wildlife, petroleum, natural gas, hydropower, wind power, lead, tin, copper, china clay, arable land, and coal
- Natural hazards: European windstorms, floods, few and small tornadoes
- Environmental issues: climate change, rising sea levels, renewable energy, waste disposal, water pollution, population density

England comprises most of the central and southern two-thirds of the island of Great Britain, in addition to a number of small islands of which the largest is the Isle of Wight. England is bordered to the north by Scotland and to the west by Wales. It is closer to continental Europe than any other part of mainland Britain, divided from France only by a 33 km (21 mi) sea gap, the English Channel. The 50 km (31 mi) Channel Tunnel, near Folkestone, directly links England to mainland Europe. The England and France border is halfway along the tunnel.

Most of England consists of low hills and plains, with upland and mountainous terrain in the north and west. Uplands in the north include the Pennines, an upland chain dividing east and west, the Lake District, containing the highest mountains in the country, the Cheviot Hills across the Anglo-Scottish border, and the North York Moors near the North Sea. Uplands in the west include Dartmoor and Exmoor in the south west and the Shropshire Hills near Wales. The approximate dividing line between terrain types is often indicated by the Tees–Exe line. To the south of that line, there are larger areas of flatter land, including East Anglia and the Fens, although hilly areas include the Cotswolds, the Chilterns, and the North and South Downs.

England is mostly rural, agriculturally prosperous and has a number of ancient woodlands and forests, but not as many as those found in some parts of Europe due to thousands of years of intense agricultural, industrial development, and historical demands for timber severely deforested the nation. Large-scale clearing began in the Neolithic and Bronze Ages to establish the farming sectors that still define the rural landscape today, including a large network of ancient hedgerows.

The largest natural harbour in England is at Poole, on the south-central coast. Some regard it as the second largest harbour in the world, after Sydney, Australia, although this fact is disputed (see harbours for a list of other large natural harbours). England is rich in natural resources including coal, petroleum, natural gas, tin, limestone, iron ore, salt, clay, chalk, gypsum, lead, and silica. It contains the UK's busiest ports and trading networks. England's position in the North Sea has also made it a great source for renewable energy. It is home to the largest offshore wind farms in the world, led by the massive Dogger Bank Wind Farm and the operational Hornsea series.

== Geology ==
England's geology is largely sedimentary with a clear northwest to southeast younging trend punctuated by the Tees-Exe line. The more ancient, harder igneous and metamorphic rocks form a stark north and west core, contrasted by the soft, more recent sedimentary strata underlying the gentler lowland scenery of the South and East. England's topography, soil and economic history is determined by this pattern which divides the island into upland and lowland parts. The line between these two regions is made by an imaginary line running from the mouth of the River Tees in the north east, to the mouth of the River Exe in the south west. To the north of this line are the old basement rocks of Paleozoic and Proterozoic geological ages that have undergone major mountain building or orogenic activity and volcanic activity in the past. These ancient, hard rocks are resistant to erosion and form the upland areas of the Lake District and the Pennines. To the south and east of this line are the younger Mesozoic and Cenozoic sediments, including sandstones, thick clays and chalk downs, such as the White Cliffs of Dover.

From the ancient continental fragments to the latest glacial deposits the detailed geology of England has much to offer the intrepid geologist in search of clues to the Earth's history. Beginning in the Proterozoic Eon when ancient volcanic arcs laid down the crystalline basement rocks in the Malvern Hills and Shropshire, England during the Paleozoic Era was a part of the microcontinent of Avalonia prior to its collision with Laurentia. During the early Paleozoic, the waters of widespread tropical seas in what would become England covered the whole landmass with Carboniferous Limestone and Coal Measures in the north and centre of England. The succeeding Mesozoic era was characterised by desert conditions that created the sedimentary New Red Sandstone of the London and Dorset Basin which was eventually covered by shallow seas to create the Jurassic sediments and the vast Cretaceous chalk beds. The late Cenozoic Era saw the distant effect of the Alpine Orogeny creating the southern foldbelt of England and the Weald with the central London Basin. The Quaternary period was dominated by ice sheets that advanced from the north repeatedly covering much of the landmass in glacial drift.

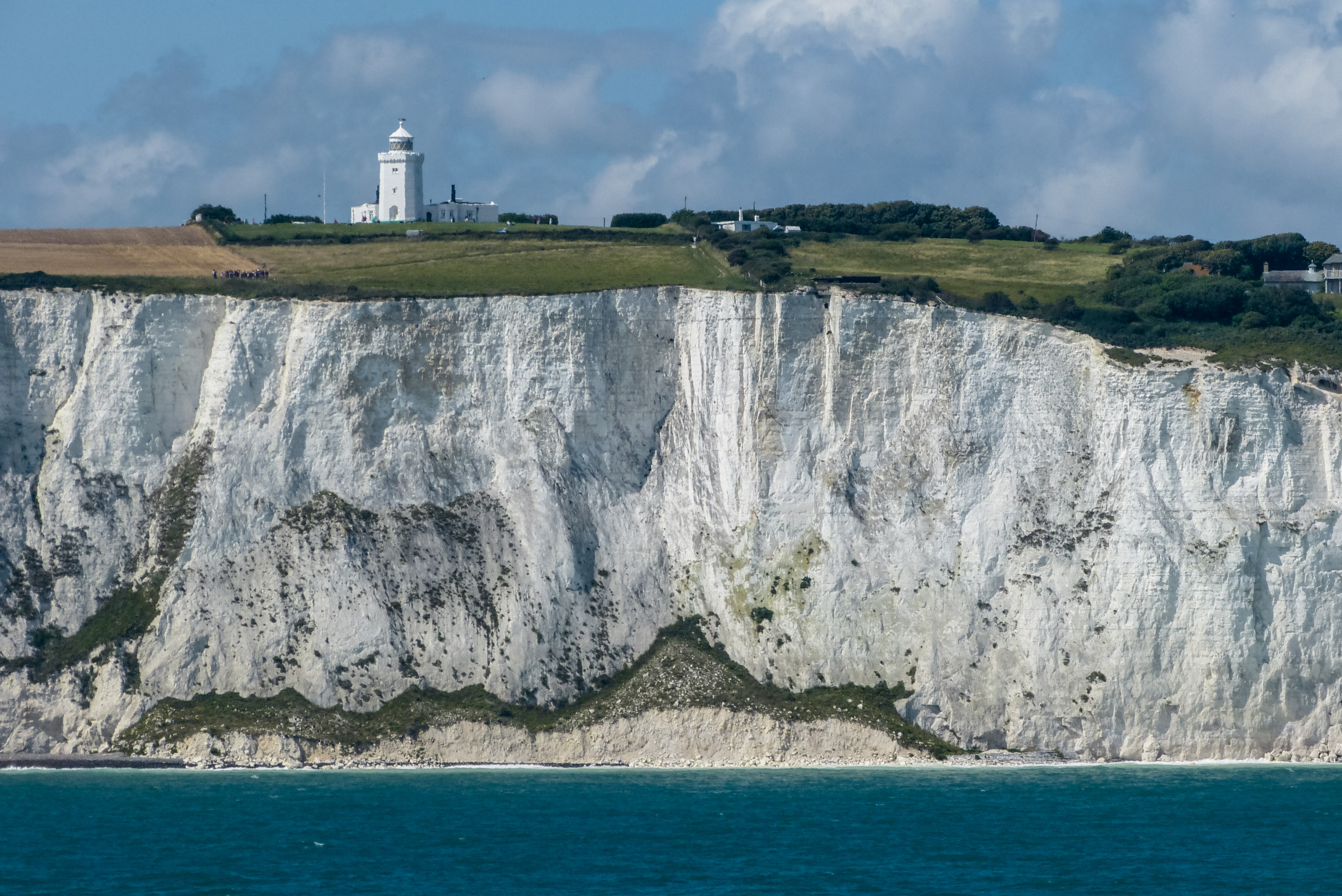
The White Cliffs of Dover, Kent, made of chalk of Cretaceous age

The English crust is approximately twenty-seven to thirty-five kilometres thick in crustal framework and terranes. Whereas Scotland was settled on the Laurentian tectonic plate, the entire territory of England and Wales was, in contrast, born as part of the Avalonia terrane. These two different sections of Great Britain were isolated by the ancient Iapetus Ocean, whose final subduction occurred about 420 million years ago. The two islands then collided along a structural plane known as the Iapetus Suture that spans across the Anglo-Scottish border from Solway Firth to Lindisfarne. These various tectonic features produced some of the most prominent geologies and classic stratigraphical sites throughout the country. The Pennines are the central backbone of northern England, largely built of Carboniferous Limestone and dramatic Millstone Grit. The Jurassic Coast of Dorset and East Devon along the south coast, offers near-continuous cliff exposures of Triassic, Jurassic and Cretaceous sediments and offers great scope for research by geologists from around the world. The London Basin to the east is a structural deep syncline of Paleogene sediment, largely of heavy London Clay, while the upland dome of the Lake District, dominated by Ordovician volcanic rocks, is deeply incisioned by Quaternary glacial erosion.

This wide range of strata that we work within has also produced valuable economic resources that have played a vital part in human history. The large coal and iron deposits of the Midlands, Yorkshire and North East supplied the raw materials that powered the great Industrial Revolution of the 18th and 19th centuries. Sedimentary strata yielded much of the building stone used for distinguishing features of Britain (from Cotswold Oolite to Portland Limestones) and it was within the violent igneous accreation of the extreme west that Cornwall became rich in the metals needed for centuries of mining for tin and copper out of the Cornubian batholith and for Lead-Zn deposits within the Pennine limestones.

Geological features

- Cheddar Gorge – the largest gorge in Great Britain
- Jurassic Coast – a UNESCO World Heritage Site
- Salisbury Plain
- Tees–Exe line
- Whin Sill
- London Basin
- Hampshire Basin
- London-Brabant Massif
- Dartmoor – one of a series of moors in the South West of England developing tors on a granitic batholith
- Lizard Complex – an ancient piece of oceanic crust, onshore (i.e. an Ophiolite).

Geological resources

- Coal
- North Sea oil
- Sand and Gravel
- China Clay
- Copper and Tin
- Stone
- North Sea gas
- Potash
- Onshore oil

and less abundantly,

- Geothermal energy

== Major towns and cities ==
York was once the capital of England.

London is, by far, the largest urban area in England and one of the largest and busiest cities in the world. Other cities, mainly in central and northern England, are of substantial size and influence. The list of England's largest cities or urban areas is open to debate because, although the normal meaning of city is "a continuously built-up urban area", this can be hard to define, particularly because administrative areas in England often do not correspond with the limits of urban development, and many towns and cities have, over the centuries, grown to form complex urban agglomerations.

The main English cities and towns are organised around wide clusters of countryside and green fields, and countryside is located within the cities themselves. Some English cities are located very near each other, but do not merge as one due to strict ''green belt'' planning laws and protected countryside. Despite the major English cities being quite dense due to the legacy of the Industrial Revoultion, they are very green with large urban parks. English cities are organised in such a way that they are dense with little or no urban sprawl taking place in England compared to other countries due to planning laws that prevent this from happening.

Rapid growth was observed in cities such as Manchester, Birmingham, and Leeds because of the availability of raw materials and transport facilities like canals and rail. However, the more ancient and older cities and towns of England are much more smaller. According to the ONS urban area populations for continuous built-up areas, these are the 15 largest conurbations (population figures from the 2001 census):

Urban area	Population (2001 Census)	Localities	Major localities
Greater London Urban Area	8,278,251	67	Croydon, Barnet, Ealing, Bromley
West Midlands Urban Area	2,440,986	22	Birmingham, Wolverhampton, Dudley, Walsall
Greater Manchester Urban Area	2,240,230	57	Manchester, Salford, Bolton, Stockport, Oldham
West Yorkshire Urban Area	1,499,465	26	Leeds, Bradford, Huddersfield, Wakefield
Tyneside	774,891	25	Newcastle upon Tyne, North Shields, South Shields, Gateshead, Jarrow
Liverpool Urban Area	816,216	8	Liverpool, St Helens, Bootle, Huyton-with-Roby
Nottingham Urban Area	666,358	15	Nottingham, Beeston and Stapleford, Carlton, Long Eaton
Sheffield Urban Area	640,720	7	Sheffield, Rotherham, Chapeltown, Mosborough/Highlane
Bristol Urban Area	551,066	7	Bristol, Kingswood, Mangotsfield, Stoke Gifford
Brighton/Worthing/Littlehampton	461,181	10	Brighton, Worthing, Hove, Littlehampton, Shoreham, Lancing
Portsmouth Urban Area	442,252	7	Portsmouth, Gosport, Waterlooville, Fareham
Leicester Urban Area	441,213	12	Leicester, Wigston, Oadby, Birstall
Bournemouth Urban Area	383,713	5	Bournemouth, Poole, Christchurch, New Milton
Reading/Wokingham Urban Area	369,804	5	Reading, Bracknell, Wokingham, Crowthorne
Teesside	365,323	7	Middlesbrough, Stockton-on-Tees, Redcar, Billingham

The largest cities in England are as follows (in alphabetical order):

- Birmingham
- Bradford
- Brighton & Hove
- Bristol
- Coventry
- Derby
- Kingston upon Hull
- Leeds
- Leicester
- Liverpool
- London
- Manchester
- Newcastle upon Tyne
- Norwich
- Nottingham
- Oxford
- Peterborough
- Plymouth
- Portsmouth
- Sheffield
- Southampton
- Stoke-on-Trent
- Sunderland
- Wolverhampton
- York

== Climate ==
Simonside Hills in Northumberland

England has a temperate climate, with plentiful rainfall all year round. It has a milder climate than many places at similar latitudes: for example Newfoundland in Canada, and Sakhalin in Russia. The seasons are quite variable in temperature; however temperatures rarely fall below −5 °C (23 °F) or rise above 30 °C (86 °F). The prevailing wind is from the south-west, frequently bringing mild and wet weather to England from the Atlantic Ocean. It is driest in the east and warmest in the south, which is closest to the European mainland. Snowfall can occur in winter and early spring, although it is not very common away from high ground.

Areas that receive the most rainfall lie within mountainous areas of the Northern England, where the terrain brings about significant orographic rainfall. These mountainous areas experience the entire onslaught of the prevalent south-westerly winds that bring moist air from the Atlantic, until such moisture is forced to rise by the elevation and condenses into rain. Unlike the lower and dry areas of eastern England, these areas of rugged west experience rainfall over two hundred days in the year. The Lake District’s Styhead is the wettest spot in the UK, with an annual rainfall of 4,590 mm (about 4.5 meters), as reported by the Met Office.

England elsewhere has warmer maximum and minimum temperatures throughout the year than the other countries of the UK, though Wales has milder minima from November to February, and Northern Ireland has warmer maxima from December to February. England is also sunnier throughout the year, but unlike Wales, Northern Ireland and Scotland, the sunniest month is July, totalling around 192.8 hours on average.

The highest temperature recorded in England is 40.3 °C (104.5 °F) on 19 July 2022 at Coningsby. The lowest temperature recorded in England is −26.1 °C (−15.0 °F) on 10 January 1982 at Edgmond, Shropshire. The climate of south-west England is rather distinct and somewhat milder than the rest of England. Crops, flowers and plants can be grown earlier there than in the rest of England and the UK. England mainly lies within hardiness zone 8, but the Pennines and Cumbrian Mountains lie in the colder zone 7, and south west England, the Irish Sea coast, South coast and London lie in the warmer zone 9. A very small area, the Isles of Scilly, lies in the warmest zone in the British Isles, zone 10 which is close to subtropical.

== Physical geography ==
=== Extreme points ===
Isles of Scilly

The extreme points of England are:

Location	Mainland only	Including islands
Northernmost point; Northernmost settlement; Southernmost point; Southernmost settlement; Westernmost point; Westernmost settlement; Easternmost point; Easternmost settlement	Marshall Meadows Bay, Northumberland at 55°48′N 2°02′W; Marshall Meadows, Northumberland at 55°48′N 2°02′W; Lizard Point, Cornwall at 49°57′N 5°12′W; Lizard, Cornwall at 49°57′N 5°12′W; Land's End, Cornwall at 50°04′N 5°43′W; Sennen Cove, Cornwall at 50°04′N 5°42′W; Lowestoft Ness, Suffolk at 52°28.87′N 1°45.77′E; Lowestoft, Suffolk at 52°28′N 1°45′E	Marshall Meadows Bay, Northumberland at 55°48′N 2°02′W; Marshall Meadows, Northumberland at 55°48′N 2°02′W; Western Rocks, Isles of Scilly at 49°51′N 6°24′W; St Agnes, Isles of Scilly at 49°53′N 6°20′W; Crim Rocks, Isles of Scilly at 49°53′N 6°27′W; St Agnes, Isles of Scilly at 49°53′N 6°21′W; Lowestoft Ness, Suffolk at 52°28.87′N 1°45.77′E; Lowestoft, Suffolk at 52°28′N 1°45′E

=== Topography, mountains and hills ===
Lake District

England is generally lower and flatter than the rest of the UK, but has two main divisions in its form – the lowland areas of the south, east, and midlands and the more rugged and upland areas of the north and west. East Anglia is the lowest area of England, having no high hills or mountains and hosting an area of the Fens, the lowest area of England. The highest area of England is the North West, which contains England's highest hills and mountains, including its highest – Scafell Pike. England is sometimes called a ''green and pleasant land'' due to its green landscape.

In England, a mountain is officially defined as land over 600 metres, so most fall in Northern England. Some hill and mountain chains in England are:

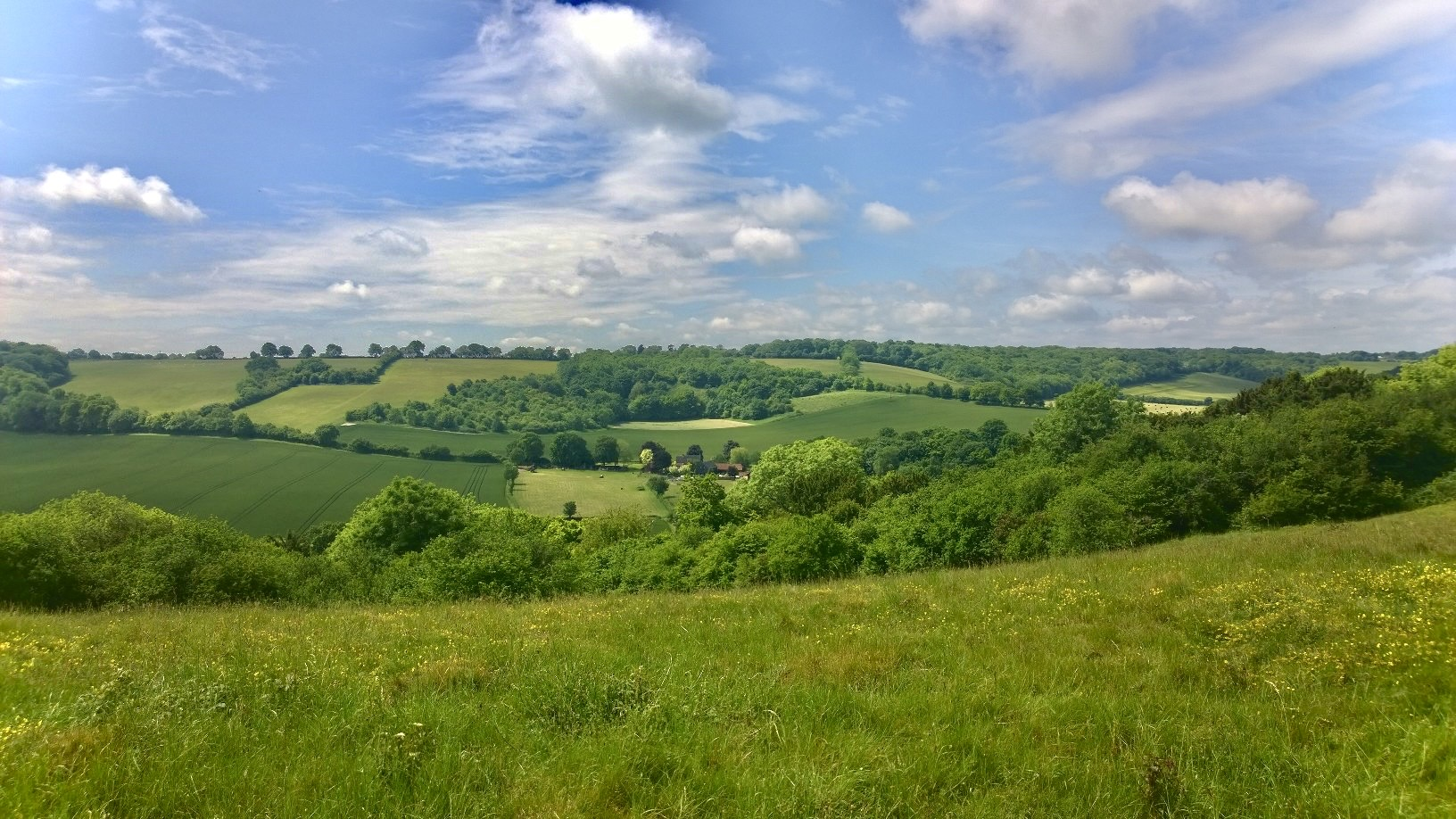
Chiltern Hills

- Lake District (Cumbrian Mountains) – the highest mountains in England, containing Scafell Pike.
- Shropshire Hills
  Cheviot Hills – sometimes considered as an extension of either the Southern Uplands in Scotland or the Pennines.
- Border Moors and Forests – uplands to the south of the Cheviot Hills.
- The Pennines which characterise much of Northern England and are often dubbed "the backbone of England".
  - The Peak District – uplands forming the southern end of the Pennines in central and northern England.
  - South Pennines - area of the southern Pennines between the Peak District, Forest of Bowland and Yorkshire Dales.
  - Forest of Bowland - a western spur of the Pennines in Lancashire.
    Yorkshire Dales
  - Yorkshire Dales – an upland area of the northern Pennines.
  - North Pennines - uplands forming the northern end of the Pennines.
- Howgill Fells - uplands in Cumbria between the Lake District and Yorkshire Dales.
- Orton Fells - uplands in Cumbria between the Lake District and Eden Valley.
- North York Moors – an area of hills and moorlands beside the North Sea.
- Exmoor – uplands beside the Bristol Channel.
- Dartmoor – an area of uplands in the heart of Devon.
- The Cotswolds – a quintessentially and stereotypical English rural area.
- Chilterns – a collection of low hills.
- South Downs – low hills close to the English Channel which form the white cliffs of the English South Coast.
- Shropshire Hills – uplands near Wales.

==== Cities ====
Cities with the highest urban elevation include Sheffield, Bradford, Stoke-on-Trent and Birmingham. Low-lying cities near sea level include London, Liverpool, Norwich and York.

=== Islands ===
The Isle of Wight

The main English islands by area and population are:

Island	Area (sq mi)	Area (km^{2})
Isle of Wight	147.09	380.99
Isle of Sheppey	36.31	94.04
Hayling Island	10.36	26.84
Foulness Island	10.09	26.84
Portsea Island	9.36	24.25
Canvey Island	7.12	18.45
Mersea Island	6.96	18.04
Walney Island	5.01	12.99
Portland	4.44	11.5
Wallasea Island	4.11	10.65

==== English islands by population ====
Island	Population (2001 UK census)
Portsea Island	147,088
Isle of Wight	132,731
Isle of Sheppey	37,852
Canvey Island	37,473
Hayling Island	16,887
Portland	12,800
Walney Island	11,391
Mersea Island	about 7,200
Barrow Island	2,606
St Mary's	1,668
Thorney Island	1,079
Foulness	212
Tresco	180
Lindisfarne	162
St Martins	142
Roa Island	100
Bryher	92
St Agnes	73
Lundy	35

=== Rivers ===
River Bollin surrounded by vegetation and with aquatic vegetation in the water during the summer

The geography of England, both physical and human, is intricately linked to its network of rivers, characterised by the existence of a topographic watershed that cuts through the heart of the country. As the uplands are mainly found in the north and west of the country, most of the long and slow-moving rivers of England run towards the east and find their way into the North Sea, whereas shorter and steep rivers run towards the west and eventually drain into the Irish Sea and Atlantic Ocean.

The River Severn earns its name as the longest river in the United Kingdom, flowing west through English counties such as Shropshire and Gloucestershire before reaching the Bristol Channel. The Severn is known throughout the world for its tidal bore, which is a strong wave which flows against the direction of the river's flow because of the unique shape of the large estuary of the river. Unlike the River Severn, the River Thames is the longest river located within England, originating from the Cotswold Hills and flowing eastwards through the ancient cities of Oxford and Windsor into London. The River Thames can be classified as an extensively engineered river system dependent on infrastructure such as the Thames Barrier to safeguard the densely populated capital city from marine floods.

Moving further northwards, the River Trent plays a crucial role in the hydrology of the Midlands as it runs northwards through the city of Nottingham and joins the River Ouse to form the massive sediment-filled Humber Estuary on the east coast. On the other hand, the Great Ouse is central to the low-lying areas of East Anglia and the Fens, as it flows at such a slow pace that it has undergone significant human modifications in centuries past. In order to turn the marshlands of eastern England into fertile agricultural land, the Great Ouse was channelled into straight man-made waterways, leading to the subsidence of the surrounding peatland, and the sinking so much so that the river flows higher than the adjacent farm fields. The Vale of York and The Fens host many of England's larger rivers.

Chalk streams are rivers that rise from springs in landscapes with chalk bedrock. Since chalk is permeable, water easily percolates through the ground to the water table and chalk streams therefore receive little surface runoff. As a result, the water in the streams contains little organic matter and sediment and is generally very clear. The beds of the rivers are generally composed of clean, compacted gravel and flints, which provide good spawning grounds for Salmonidae fish species. Since they are primarily fed by aquifers, the flow rate, mineral content and temperature range of chalk streams shows less seasonal variation than other rivers. They are mildly alkaline and contain high levels of nitrate, phosphate, potassium and silicate. In addition to algae and diatoms, the streams provide a suitable habitat for macrophytes (including water crowfoot) and oxygen levels are generally supportive of coarse fish populations. Of the 210 rivers classified as chalk streams globally, 160 are in England.

=== Forests and woodlands ===
10% of England is covered with forests

The total area covered by woodlands and forests constitutes about 10% of the entire land surface in England, thus making England among the least wooded countries in Europe. Even though the amount of forested land may be considered minimal, the forestation of England is very varied and has great historical significance.It ranges from ancient semi-natural forests to commercial conifer plantations and large scale afforestation projects.

The definition of a forest in England has historically been legal rather than ecological. Following the Norman Conquest, a royal forest was a legally defined tract of land reserved for the monarch to hunt deer and wild boar. These regions were subject to a separate body of strict forest law and often contained vast expanses of open heathland, bog, and pasture alongside dense stands of trees. Surviving examples of these historic hunting grounds include the New Forest in Hampshire, the Forest of Dean in Gloucestershire, and the remnants of Sherwood Forest in Nottinghamshire.

Ecologically, England's tree canopy is divided between native broadleaf woods and non-native conifer plantations. Ancient woodland represents land that has been continuously wooded since at least the year 1600 and serves as a vital ecological baseline supporting rare indicator species of flora, fungi, and insects. In the lowlands of the south and east, the landscape is naturally dominated by English oak, European beech, ash, and hazel, with the English Lowlands beech forests forming a distinct ecoregion across the chalk ridges of the Chiltern Hills. In contrast, massive evergreen plantations were introduced across northern and eastern England during the twentieth century to secure a domestic timber supply. Managed largely by Forestry England, these sites feature fast-growing species like Sitka spruce and Corsican pine, with Kielder Forest in Northumberland standing as the largest man-made forest in the country, followed by the lowland pine expanse of Thetford Forest in East Anglia.

Government initiatives have also established several urban community forests to bring nature closer to major population centres. The most ambitious modern project is the Northern Forest, a long-term strategy spanning from Liverpool to Hull that aims to plant over 50 million trees to mitigate carbon emissions, manage regional flood risks, and establish new ecological corridors across northern England.

=== Temperate rainforests ===
England was once covered by a temperate rainforest.

A rare and distinct subset of England's tree canopy consists of temperate rainforests, also known as Atlantic or Celtic woodlands. Influenced by the Gulf Stream, these forests are restricted to the western seaboard where a hyper-oceanic climate provides high levels of humidity, frequent rainfall, and mild, stable temperatures throughout the year. These unique environmental conditions allow English rainforests to support a globally significant biodiversity profile. They are structurally characterised by an abundance of epiphytic plants—such as mosses, liverworts, ferns, and lichens—that grow directly on the trunks and branches of mature trees, relying entirely on the damp air and rainwater for sustenance.

These rich woods formerly covered large areas of western Britain, but deforestation through agriculture, historic felling of forest to produce timber, and plantation of uniform conifer forests has resulted in severe fragmentation of this habitat. Currently, less than 1% of land in Great Britain supports temperate rainforest fragments, which in England exist only in specific, well-sheltered regions. In contrast to other densely forested areas of the country that provide timber, these woodlands are structurally characterised by native broad-leaved trees like sessile oak, birch, and hazel.

Since they contain highly specialized species that cannot tolerate any level of drought such as tree lungwort and hazel gloves fungus, conservationists consider the maintenance of such micro-climates as an urgent issue. Current approaches to restoration have departed from viewing these sites as historical oddities and have moved into landscape-level restoration. The Department for Environment, Food and Rural Affairs came up with a strategy that supports the conservation of these Atlantic forests. On the other hand, some large scale long-term projects carried out by the Woodland Trust and The Wildlife Trusts are geared towards buffer zone enhancement. Such projects mostly include grazing control that allows natural tree re-generation, removal of invader species such as rhododendron, and planting of native corridors.

=== Coastline ===
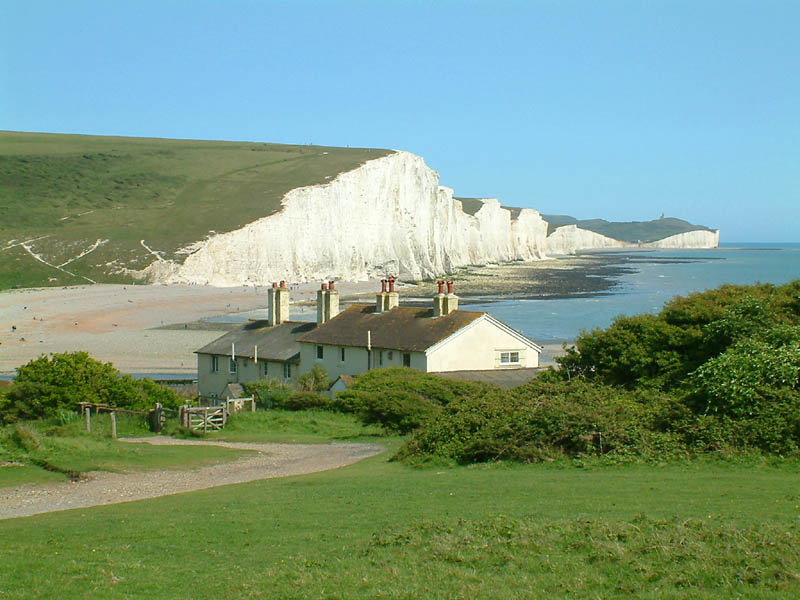
The Seven Sisters cliffs, East Sussex

England has 4,422 km (2,748 mi) of coastline. Stretching across thousands of miles, it ranges from chalk cliffs and rocky headlands to vast stretches of sandy beaches, salt marshes, and estuaries with deep waters. Influenced by its complex geology and intense marine erosion, the English coastal region has determined the fate of English maritime commerce and national defense over centuries. The coast of England can be considered a live laboratory in geology. It has the a coastal World Heritage Site located in Dorset and East Devon. The area contains an unbroken sequence of rock formations from the Triassic, Jurassic, and Cretaceous periods covering 185 million years of Earth’s history. The coastal regions of England are home to numerous ecosystems, which include sand dunes, vegetated shingle beaches, salt marshes, and maritime cliffs. Some of the species that depend on such ecosystems for their survival and reproduction include puffins, kittiwakes, and gannets, especially in offshore islands such as the Farne Islands and Bempton Cliffs.

Jurassic Coast

The English coastline varies a great deal by the seas and regions it borders. The North Sea coast of England is mainly flat and sandy with many dunes and is similar to coastlines across the sea in the Netherlands. The English North Sea coast is an important area of bird life and is a habitat for many shore and wading birds. Along the English Channel, the South Coast builds up into steep, white cliffs at Dover, which are often seen as an iconic symbol of England and Britain. The South Coast continues to the Isle of Wight, but eventually gives way to the Jurassic Coast of Dorset, a coastline rich in beauty, history and fossils.

Great Hangman, the highest sea cliff in mainland England, rising 1,043 feet (318 meters) high with an 800-foot sheer cliff face along the South West Coast Path.

In Devon and Cornwall, the coastline becomes more rocky and steep, with numerous cliffs and tiny fishing villages along the coastline. This stretch of coastline stretches from Devon to Land's End in Cornwall, the westernmost part of mainland England. The coastline of Devon and Cornwall has similarities to that of Brittany in France directly opposite. Following the coastline northwards the coast remains much the same as in south Devon and Cornwall but is besides the Celtic Sea until it eventually reaches the Bristol Channel, an important shipping and docking area.

The English coastline re-emerges again in North West England. The coastline here is similar to the North Sea coast in that it is mainly flat and sandy, with the only notable cliffs along this stretch of coast being at St Bees Head in Cumbria. The English Irish Sea coast is an important area of estuaries and bird life, with Wirral being a peninsula bounded by two rivers, the River Dee and the River Mersey. Liverpool and Merseyside are areas of high population and important industry along this coast, with tourist resorts of Southport and Blackpool being further to the north. the English Irish Sea coast hosts two important geographic areas, Morecambe Bay, a large bay, and the Furness and Walney Island areas. Further north into Cumbria the Sellafield Nuclear Power Station lies along this coast. The English section of the Irish Sea coast ends at the border with Scotland in the Solway Firth.

Seas bordering England are:

- North Sea
- English Channel
- Celtic Sea
- Bristol Channel
- Irish Sea

=== Largest lakes and reservoirs ===
Although the largest nation within the UK, England is relatively absent of large lakes, with many of its former wetlands being drained throughout the Middle Ages. Most of its largest lakes lie within the aptly named Lake District in Cumbria, Northern England.

Lake / Reservoir Name	Area (km²)	Area (sq mi)	Type
Windermere	14.8	5.69	Natural
Rutland Water	10.9	4.19	Reservoir
Kielder Water	10.0	3.86	Reservoir
Ullswater	8.9	3.44	Natural
Derwentwater	5.5	2.06	Natural
Bassenthwaite Lake	5.3	2.06	Natural
Coniston Water	4.9	1.89	Natural
Haweswater Reservoir	3.9	1.50	Reservoir
Thirlmere	3.3	1.25	Reservoir
Ennerdale Water	3.0	1.00	Natural

== Human geography ==
England has a wide canal system

England's human geography involves dense population and urbanisation along with an economy which has been greatly influenced by industry. England is the largest and most populous of the four constituent countries of the United Kingdom. It accounts for over 84% of the UK's entire population. Though there are high population densities in England, most people live in compact areas, leaving the rest of the country as open country or open spaces, mostly used for farming. Approximately less than 10% of England is built on. More than 70% of the land of England is cultivated using intensive and mechanised agricultural practices; arable farming in the relatively flat eastern regions and livestock farming in the hilly western regions.

The settlement pattern of England is characterised by a north-west to south-east economic orientation that revolves around Greater London, one of the world's leading financial and cultural centers. Even though heavy industries and mining operations have reduced significantly in the last century, they have left their indelible mark on England's economy. In the current times, England's economic geography includes services, advanced technology and agricultural regions in rural lowlands where machinery is extensively used. Transport geography of England includes a radial wide road and rail network leading up to major cities along with vital cross border links like the Channel Tunnel, which is the longest underground transport tunnel in the world.

The English canal system reflects a history of the nation's development in terms of its economy and cities. These narrow waterways were created in the 18th and 19th centuries with the intent to support the Industrial Revolution. The canals functioned as the arteries of industry in the English nation by transporting materials necessary for the growth of industry. Despite rail ultimately replacing commercial water traffic, they were not forgotten in their entirety. The English canals have now been revived through urban renewal and serve to be an important source of green infrastructure used for tourism and premium housing as well as being part of city ecosystems.

=== Biodiversity ===
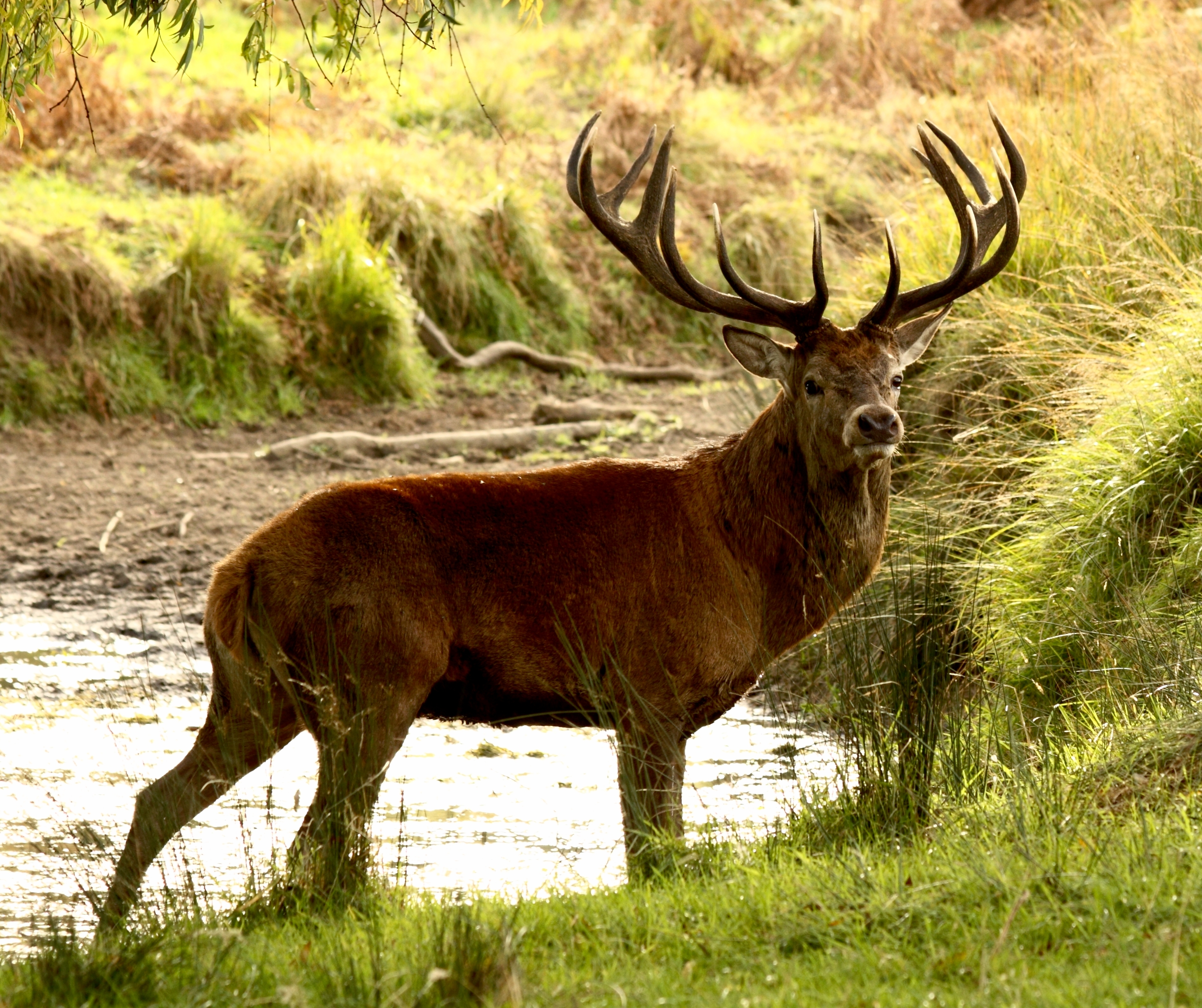
Red Deer in Surrey

The diversity of life in England includes the range of plants, animals, wildlife, and unique ecosystems. Ranging from the wide coastlines through the temperate deciduous forests, to lowland heath and blanket bogs to the highly modified agriculture, wetlands, and urban systems, the wildlife in England is intricately linked with thousands of years of human land manipulation. Current conservation efforts are led by Natural England together with organisations such as The Wildlife Trusts, the Royal Society for the Protection of Birds, and the National Trust.

The marine climatic environment offers mild winters and moderate summers, giving rise to an optimal climate for certain ecosystems in Europe. The country boasts global importance because it provides around twenty percent of the Europe's lowland heathlands and estuaries, which provide migration routes for wildfowl and waders. Lowland heaths refer to ecosystems characterised by nutrient-poor and acidic soils, home to the rare species of nightjars, smooth snakes, sand lizards and several heathers, although highly susceptible to fragmentation.

Temperate broadleaf woodlands are dominated by ancient oaks, beech, and ashes, providing habitat for bluebells, wood anemones, and tawny owls. Chalk downlands offer the presence of alkaline and lime-rich soil to provide high plant biodiversity, such as Adonis blue butterfly, blue orchids, and pasque flowers. At the edges of the nation, estuaries and coastal marshes are formed by intertidal mudflats, salt marshes, sand dunes, and shingle beaches, forming a habitat of curlew, dark-bellied brent geese, and samphire. Blanket bogs constitute peat wetlands that support sphagnum moss, sundews, golden plover, and the threatened hen harriers in the northern uplands.

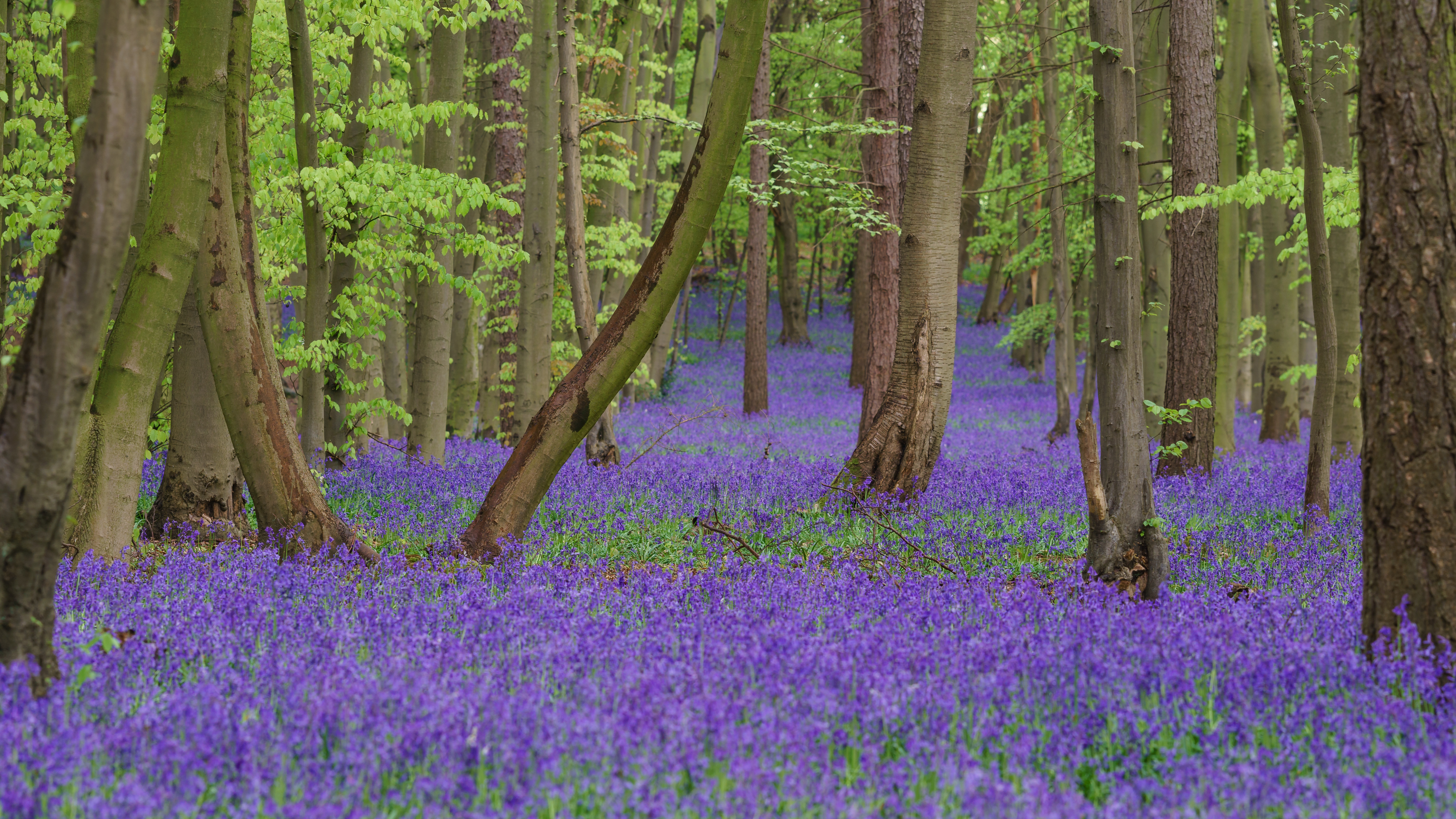
England has a big part of the world's bluebell population.

England has about 1,400 types of native vascular plants. In spring, you can see carpets of bluebells, a common sight here since England has a big part of the world's bluebell population. Orchid species, like the rare fly orchid and monkey orchid, are often found on chalk hills. However, a report showed that more than half of the native plant species have become less common since 1970. There are no large predators living in the wild in England. The biggest land carnivores left are the red fox and the European badger. Species like the European hedgehog and hazel dormouse are struggling, with big drops in their numbers. The native red squirrel has been mostly pushed out by the grey squirrel. Estuaries are home to lots of wading birds during the winter. Bird of prey numbers, such as the red kite and peregrine falcon, have gone up a lot after they were historically hunted and banned pesticides were introduced. England also has interesting insects, like the stag beetle in the southern woods and the swallowtail butterfly, which only lives in the Norfolk Broads. Native reptiles and amphibians include the common grass snake and smooth newt, as well as species in trouble that need specific habitats, like the sand lizard and natterjack toad.

Dartmoor ponies

England has several types of protected areas to safeguard its vulnerable ecosystems. These areas are designated under both national and international rules. About one million hectares of land and freshwater, plus over two million hectares of coastal waters, have formal biodiversity protections. The main type of protected area is the Site of Special Scientific Interest. These sites are chosen for their important biological or geological features and are considered the country's best conservation spots. The Environment Act requires that by 2042, seventy-five percent of these sites must be in good condition. International agreements also help protect these areas. Special Areas of Conservation are designated to protect rare habitats or vulnerable species other than birds. Special Protection Areas are set up specifically to protect wild birds and the places they use for migration. Additionally, Ramsar Sites, which are recognised globally, focus on protecting important wetlands, especially those used by waterfowl.

Nature reserves in England are actively managed to protect wildlife while allowing public access. More than two hundred National Nature Reserves, covering large areas, are home to some of the country's rarest wildlife. Urban areas in England are becoming more important for saving biodiversity. These built-up areas have a mix of parks, private yards, community gardens, old industrial sites, and transport routes like train tracks. Private gardens alone take up a lot of space in England. They offer important food sources and safe passage for animals like urban foxes, hedgehogs, frogs, and insects that pollinate plants. Old industrial sites, known as brownfield sites, often have thin soil found in special natural areas like chalk grasslands. Because of this, these sites can support diverse plant life and rare insects, such as the shrill carder bee. Some animal species have managed to thrive in cities. For instance, peregrine falcons nest on tall buildings and church towers to hunt pigeons. Big cities like London have also seen large increases in badger and red fox populations.

==== Rewilding ====
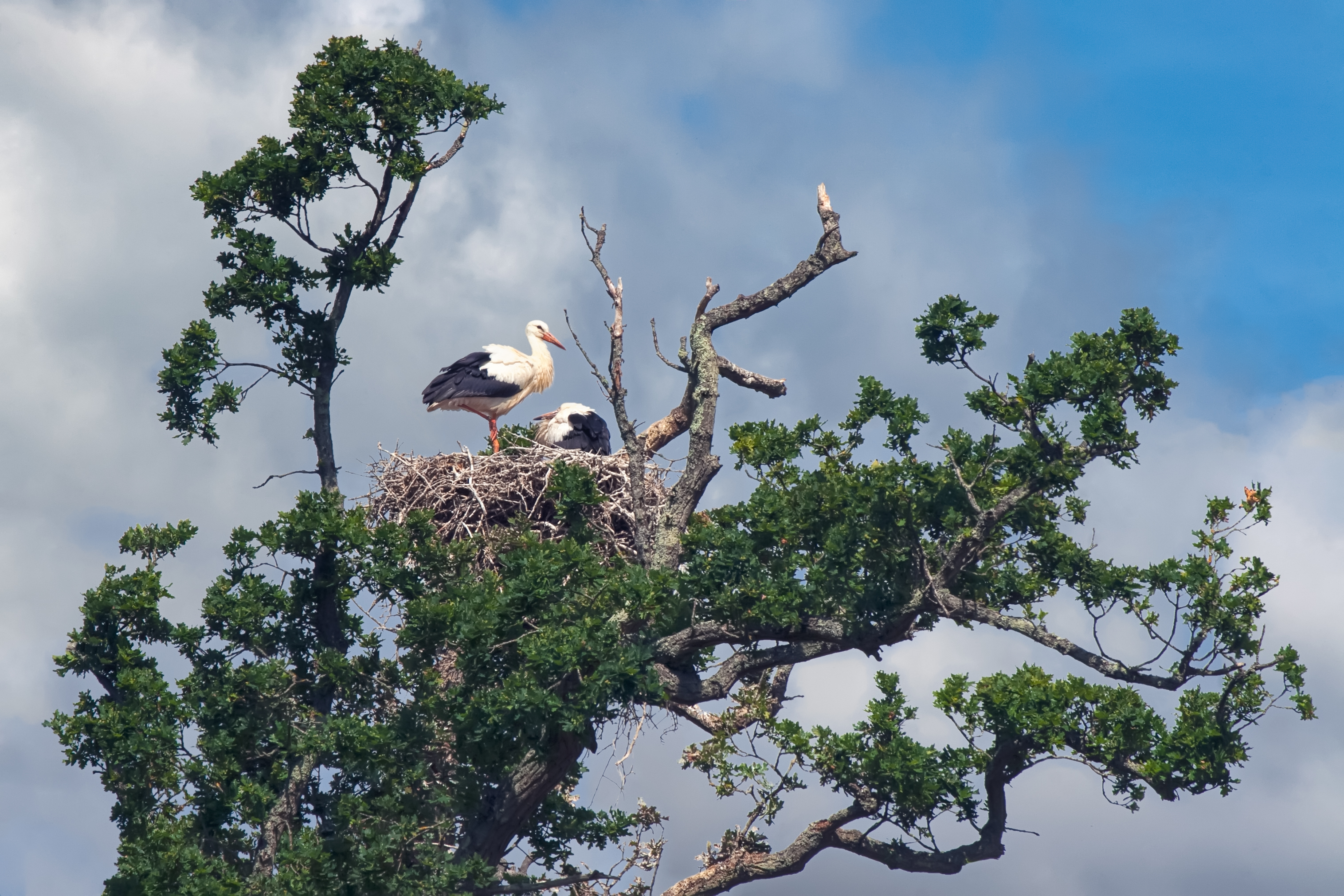
Stork nest at Knepp Wildland. In 2020, white stork were observed raising chicks here for the first time in Britain in 600 years.

In recent years, rewilding has emerged as a significant and distinct trend within England's land-use landscape. Unlike traditional conservation, which often focuses on maintaining specific habitats or protecting individual species through hands-on management, rewilding aims to restore natural processes. Located in West Sussex, Knepp is England’s most famous pioneer of lowland rewilding. In 2001, the estate shifted away from intensive arable and dairy farming on its heavy clay soils. Instead, they introduced free-roaming, hardy herbivores—including Old English Longhorn cattle, Exmoor ponies, Tamworth pigs, and red and fallow deer. These animals act as "ecosystem engineers," their grazing and rooting behaviors driving the creation of a dynamic mosaic of scrub, wood-pasture, and meadow. The project has seen an extraordinary return of rare species, including turtle doves, purple emperor butterflies, and the first wild-nesting storks in England for centuries.

Situated on the coastal edge of Norfolk, Wild Ken Hill uses a three-pronged model that blends rewilding with active land use. The estate dedicates its soils completely to rewilding, allowing natural processes to take over and introducing beavers to restore local wetlands. Concurrently, it practices regenerative agriculture on its productive farmland to grow food sustainably and actively manages its traditional woodlands for biodiversity.

Based in the rugged Lake District, Wild Ennerdale is one of the UK's longest-running upland rewilding partnerships. A collaboration between the Forestry Commission, National Trust, United Utilities, and Natural England, the project allows the River Liza to flow without human interference, reduces commercial conifer logging in favour of native broadleaf regeneration, and uses low-intensity grazing by Galloway cattle to shape a wilder mountain landscape.

Declared in 2020, Purbeck Heaths in Dorset is England’s first "super" National Nature Reserve. Spanning more than 3,000 hectares, the initiative knitted together separate parcels of land managed by different conservation bodies and private estates. By tearing down internal fencing, it created a vast, unbroken landscape where cattle, ponies, and pigs can wander freely across lowland heath, peat bogs, and woodlands, replicating prehistoric grazing patterns.

The ecological dynamics of rewilding are heavily shaped by existing native wildlife, including the European badger. As one of England's largest remaining terrestrial predators and a prolific excavator, the badger plays a complex role in restored landscapes. Badgers function as ecosystem engineers in their own right, as their extensive underground setts disturb the soil, aerate the ground, and create micro-habitats that benefit various insects, plants, and small mammals. Their foraging behavior, which involves digging for earthworms, grubs, and roots, breaks up dense ground vegetation and assists in seed dispersal.

Celtic Rewilding was established in 2020, with the aim of reintroducing extinct species of reptile and amphibian (such as the European pond turtle, moor frog, agile frog, common tree frog and pool frog) to England. Success has already been achieved with the captive breeding of the moor frog. A reintroduction trial of the European pond turtle to its historic, Holocene range in the East Anglian Fens, Brecks and Broads has been initiated, with support from the University of Cambridge.

=== Land use ===
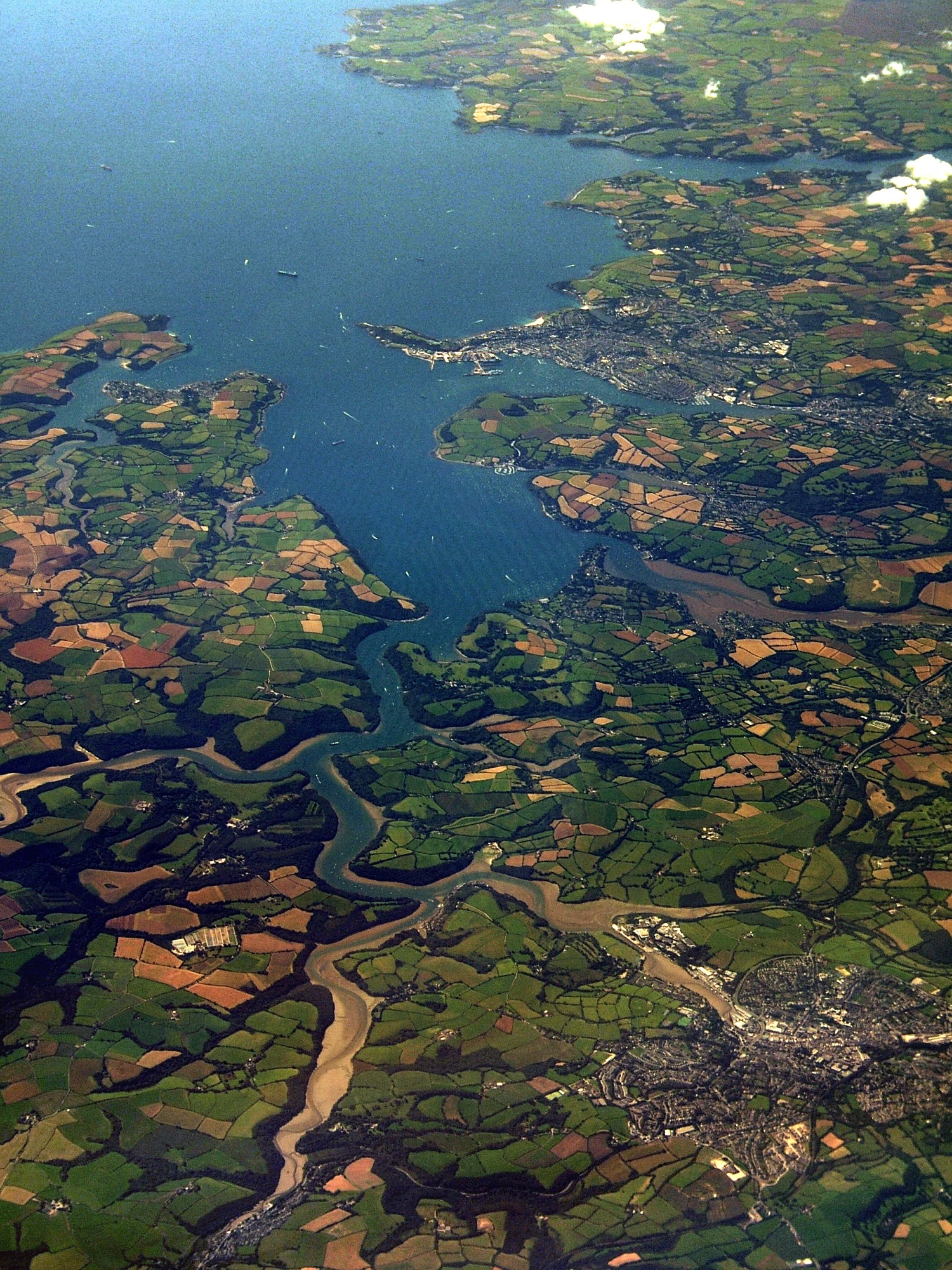
An aerial view of Carrick Roads in Cornwall, located on the southwestern peninsula of England.

Land use in England is characterised by a dominant rural agricultural footprint alongside urban landscapes and dedicated areas for forestry and conservation. Agriculture is the largest single land use category in England, accounting for approximately 68% to 70% of the total land area. The distribution of farming types is strongly influenced by the country's varied topography, soil quality, and climate. Predominates in the flatter, drier eastern and south-eastern regions (such as East Anglia and Lincolnshire), where fertile soils support crops like wheat, barley, sugar beet, and oilseed rape. Pastoral farming is s concentrated in the wetter, hillier western and northern regions (such as the South West, the Pennines, and Cumbria), where the climate and terrain favour livestock grazing for dairy, beef, and sheep farming.

The total land area of England, excluding inland water, is 130,310 km^{2} (50,313 sq mi). Crops and fallow land accounts for 30% of the land area, grasses and rough grazing 36%, other agricultural land 5%, and forest and woodland 10%. Despite the high population density in England, urban and developed regions account for approximately 8.7% to 12% of the nation's land area. This urban footprint is predominantly found in major conurbations. Infrastructure-wise, a considerable portion of the developed land is allocated to transportation networks, which encompass an extensive array of motorways, railways, cycle lanes, and canals.

Areas of outstanding landscape—such as the Lake District, the Peak District, Yorkshire Dales, and Dartmoor—cover roughly 10% of the country and are protected for conservation and public recreation. Areas of Outstanding Natural Beauty (AONBs) and National Landscapes cover an additional 15% of England, designated to safeguard precious landscapes while supporting rural economies.

=== Neighbouring countries ===
England has two land borders: a 96 km (60 mi) border with Scotland that follows the Cheviot Hills and a 257 km (160 mi) border with Wales that loosely follows the route of Offa's Dyke. To the west, the Irish Sea separates England from Ireland and the Isle of Man; to the east, the North Sea separates England from Denmark, Germany, the Netherlands and Belgium and to the south, the English Channel separates England from France and the Channel Islands.

=== Economic geography ===
The City of London, the financial capital of England, and the United Kingdom as a whole

England boasts one of the largest economies in Europe and the world, with an average GDP per capita of £22,907. England's economy is usually regarded as a mixed market economy, it has adopted many free market, yet maintains an advanced social welfare infrastructure. The currency in England is the pound sterling, also known as the GBP. England prints its own banknotes which are also circulated in Wales. The economy of England is the largest part of the United Kingdom's economy.

England has evolved from a traditional economy based on agriculture, global trade, and innovative manufacturing into one of the most service-dominated economies by the late 20th century and early 21st century. The country today is an important center for finance, research and development, creative industries, and higher education, with a social market economic regulatory system and global trade links.

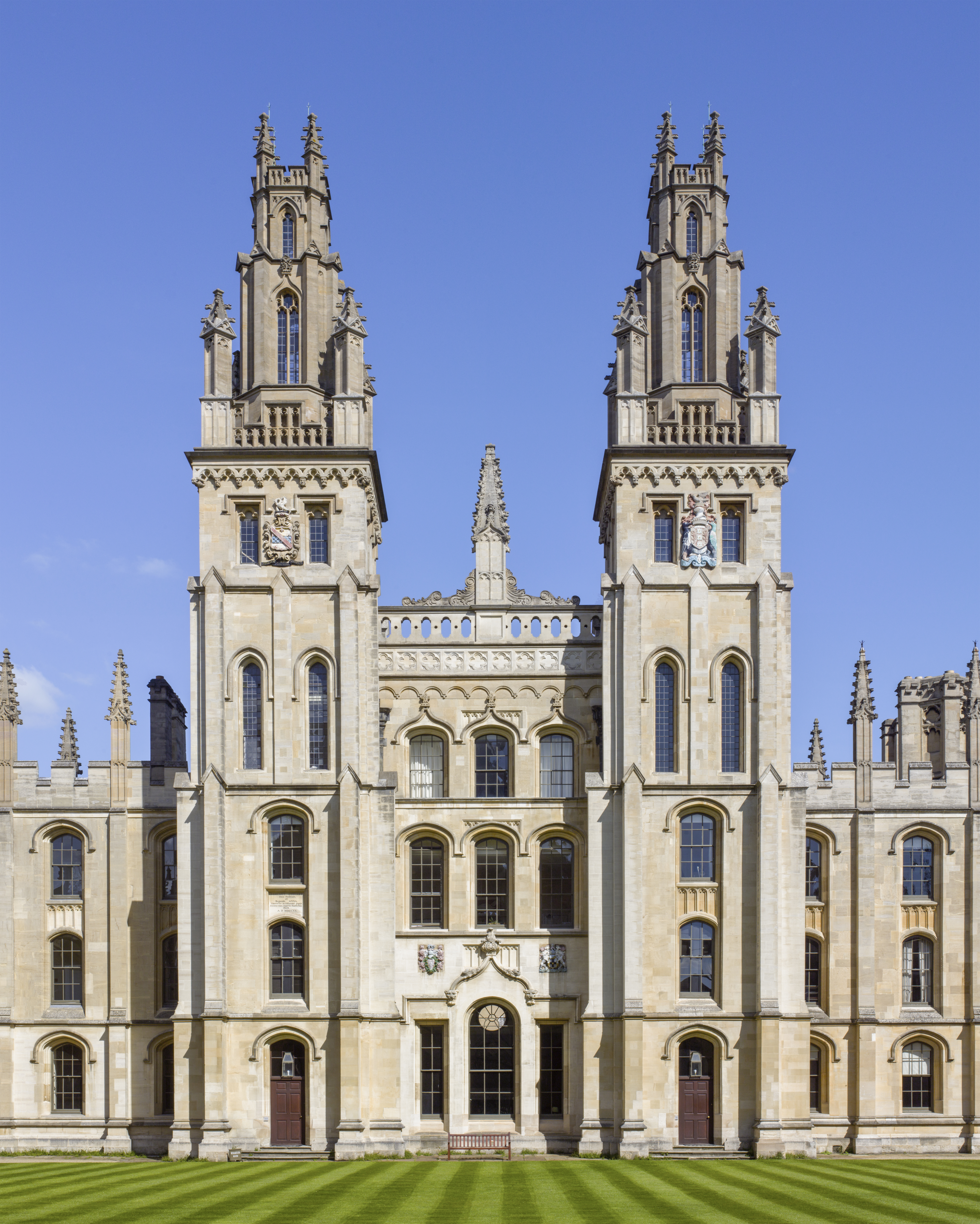
The golden triangle is the triangle formed by the university cities of Cambridge, London, and Oxford in the south east.

A near-monolithic cornerstone of England's modern economy is its massive service sector, providing the lion's share of its wealth and jobs. London remains one of the world's leading financial hubs, with the London Stock Exchange, numerous international banks, Lloyd's of London insurance, and clusters of corporate law firms and management consultancies. The services economy is also supported by a buoyant digital-technologies sector, a tourist economy built around aging cultural artefacts and tourist hubs, and a globally influential creative economy based in fashion, music, and the media. Tertiary education also contributes to the economy, with universities producing biotech and scientific research clusters based in the so-called Golden Triangle.

Traditional industries England still retains a large industrial and manufacturing base, with many high-end and technologically advanced sectors, and continues to be a leader in aerospace, pharmaceuticals, automotive engineering and arms manufacturing, with numerous multinational corporations owning huge manufacturing plants throughout the Midlands and the North of England. The focus of manufacturing in the country is far more research and development and precision engineering. The energy industry is also undergoing huge change, as fossil fuel extraction from the North Sea decreases and is substituted with rapid investment into green energy infrastructure, such as offshore wind farms, several of which are the largest in the world.

The production and consumption of beer (real ale), wine, cider, and gin form a significant sector of England's food and drink economy, acting as a major component of the wider United Kingdom alcohol industry which contributes billions of pounds annually to the national gross domestic product.

Regional differences

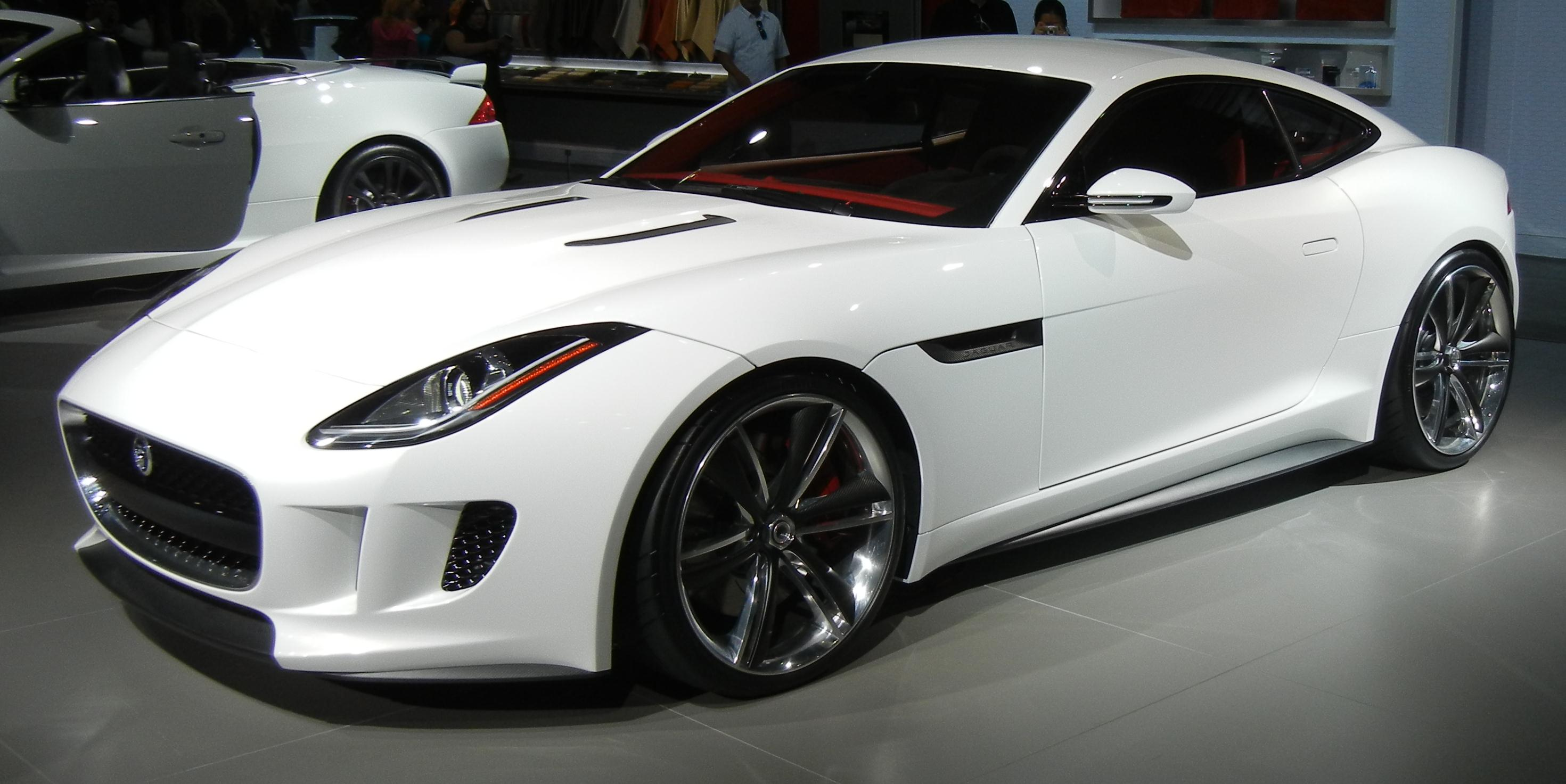
Jaguar is a well-known English luxury vehicle brand of Jaguar Land Rover, a multinational manufacturer with its headquarters in Coventry.

Greater London and the South East are the clear headquarters of the UK's economic strength and the sole pillars of the UK's global positioning in finance, tech, science, education, and corporate services. London is a leader in finance, with unparalleled strength in investment banking, insurance and legal services, as well as Europe's largest tech start-up cluster. Beyond the capital, the South East dominates digital tech, corporate headquarters and high-end research and development, including the Golden Triangle of scientific and biotech research that connects London's, Oxford's and Cambridge's research strengths to global sources of venture capital.

The Midlands has a thriving economic spirit driven by high-tech engineering, automotive and logistics. Birmingham, the second largest city in England, has developed into a core region for business, professional and financial services including key international banking groups, while nearby the West Midlands continues to be one of the key markets for research and development in electric cars and aerospace engineering. The East Midlands region is leveraging its geographic proximity to become the UK's leading area for warehousing, freight and logistics companies, in addition to specialist aerospace clusters.

Situated in the 'heart' of the UK, North West of England's two dominant economic drivers have been the former industrial powerhouses of Liverpool and Manchester. Modern digital and commercial cities, Manchester is strong in digital and creative industries with dominant media complexes in addition to flourishing fintech, eCommerce and even advanced materials research in graphene. Meanwhile, the port-based economy of Liverpool, which benefits from historic maritime infrastructure, continues as a leading global shipping and logistics gateway while expanding into life sciences, pharmaceuticals manufacturing and low carbon and renewable energy.

The green economy in Yorkshire and the Humber and North East is home to critical manufacturing industries, Yorkshire and the Humber combines high-value manufacturing activity with fast-growing green energy infrastructure. Leeds is the UK's biggest financial and legal services cluster outside London, and a hub of emerging expertise in healthcare technology and data-driven digital. Closer to home, Sheffield has an international reputation for steel, precision engineering, and manufacturing research; along the coast and north to Teesside and Newcastle the regional economy has moved in a green direction, becoming one of the UK's green energy and carbon capture hotspots. In the South West of England, the unique economic characteristics of the region combine high-tech engineering and innovation with a range of environmental and marine sciences. Bristol is the economic driving force of the region and worldwide hub for high-tech aerospace engineering, robotics and microchip design. The wider South West has one of the largest tourism economies in the world thanks to its unique geographical location, while the South West has become a global leader in marine science, environmental research and defence-related industries.

The strength of the English economy varies from region to region. GDP, and GDP per capita is highest in London. Generally the Northern and Western areas of England are the poorest, with the Southern and Eastern areas being the richest.

=== Agriculture ===
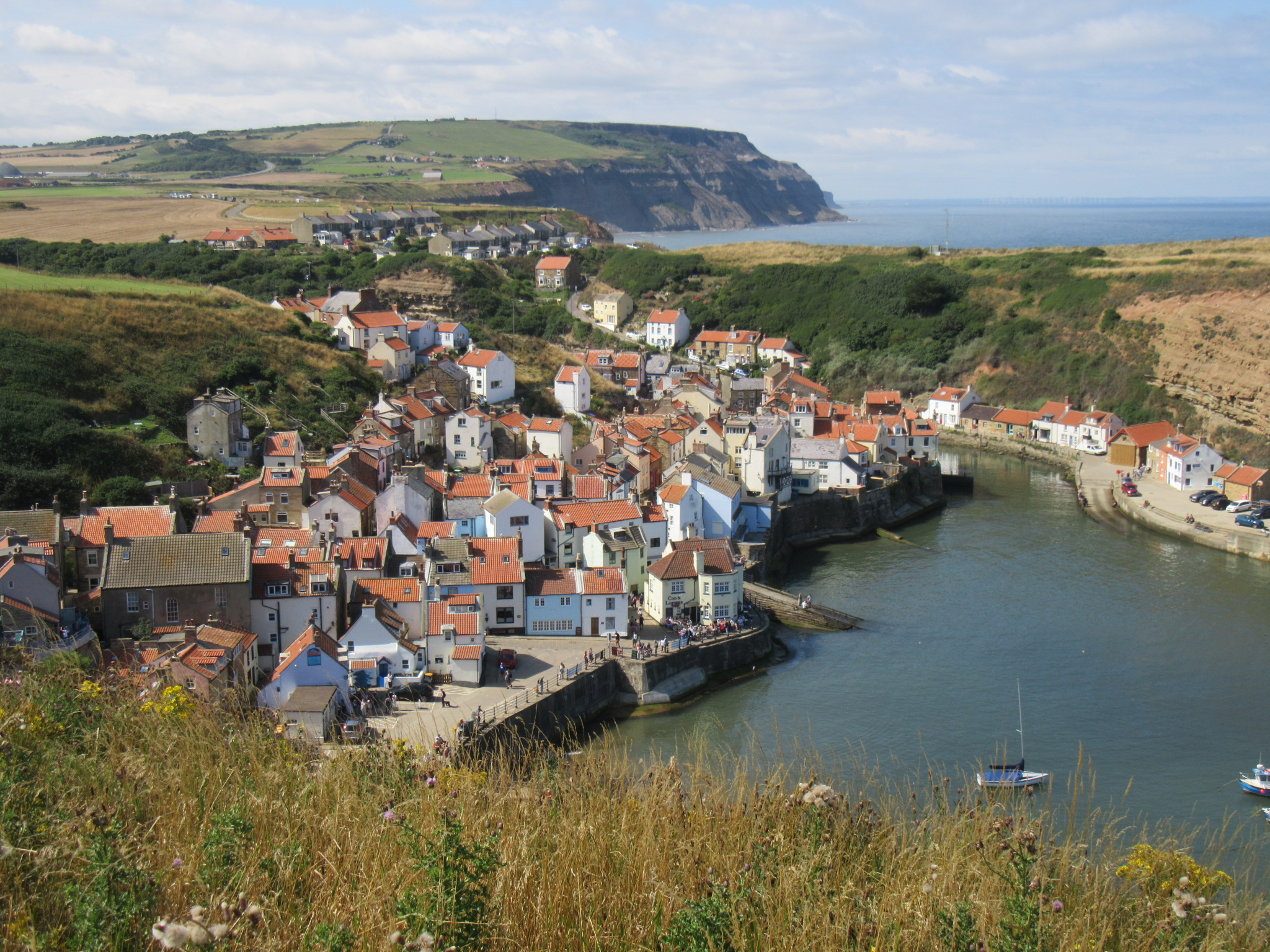
The fishing village of Staithes in Yorkshire. From the 16th century it developed a strong reputation in Europe for fishing.

England has a high amount of rainfall with a temperate climate, and possesses ideal qualities to support strong agriculture. English agriculture is advanced, mechanised, and highly productive by European standards, supplying about 60% of the country’s requirement of food domestically. 69% of land area in England is devoted to agriculture, with England making up about 85% of the total agricultural land in the whole United Kingdom and more than 73% of its revenue generation.

There is high regional specialisation in English agriculture. The lowlands of East Anglia, East Midlands, and parts of Yorkshire have very rich soils of alluvial and loam variety that lend themselves to intensive arable agriculture. On the other hand, the wetter conditions along with the rough landscape of the West Midlands, South West, and Northern Pennines suit grazing and animal rearing. The agricultural sector in England includes more than 100,000 separate farmholdings. Although the average size of the farms is quite big compared to other countries in Europe, the overall workforce of the sector constitutes only 1% of the total employment of England, making heavy use of seasonal labour and precise mechanization.

English long horn cow in the Derbyshire Dales

The total area of agricultural holdings is about 41.619 million acres (16.843 million hectares), of which about a third are arable and most of the rest is grassland. In 2022, only 4.4 million hectares (10.87 million acres) were planted. The remainder lay fallow or as temporary grassland. During the growing season about 72% of the arable area is cereal crops, and of the cereal crop area, more than 57% is wheat.

There are about 33 million sheep, 9.6 million cattle, 188 million poultry and 5.2 million pigs. These are arranged on about 100,000 holdings, whose average croppable area is around 69 hectares (170 acres). About 70% of farms are owner-occupied or mostly so (perhaps with individual barns or fields let out), and the remainder are rented to tenant farmers. The eastern and southern counties of England where the fields are flatter, larger and more open tend to concentrate on cereal crops, while the hillier northern and western areas with smaller, more enclosed fields tend to concentrate on livestock farming.

English farmland in Somerset

As far as payments for farming activities in England are concerned, subsidies are not linked to the size of the land. Instead, these subsidies have been substituted by the new schemes of Sustainable Farming Incentive (SFI) and Environmental Land Management (ELM). Such measures involve rewarding farmers for managing land for environmental goals including wildlife corridors, growing of hedgerows, and better soil management. Additionally, climate challenges have sped up the process of adopting the following agricultural practices: precise farming, biofuel crops production, and farm diversification. England has a long-standing tradition of promoting animal welfare, having been the first country in the world to pass legislation specifically aimed at ensuring the well-being of animals.

=== Political geography ===
England, formerly a kingdom and independent country, united with Scotland to form what would eventually become the UK, with Wales treated as part of England at that time. England is in a unique and controversial position of being a political entity within the UK and as of 2015 having no self-governance. England is represented by MPs in the British Parliament and matters relating only to England are also dealt with by the UK Parliament.

The Great Clock of Westminster

The administrative subdivisions of England are varied, consisting of multiple overlapping layers established by successive local government reforms. The territory is organised into both ceremonial and functional frameworks, which operate across different spatial scales. At the macro level, England is organised into nine distinct regions for statistical and strategic planning purposes. For ceremonial and cultural identity, the land is divided into 48 ceremonial counties, each appointed a Lord Lieutenant and High Sheriff to represent the Crown. While these ceremonial areas do not serve an administrative function, they form the standard baseline for geographical reference. The actual delivery of local government and public services operates on a mixed model across the country. In many areas, a traditional two-tier system is used, consisting of county councils subdivided into smaller district councils. Other parts of England rely on a single-tier system consisting of unitary authorities, while major urban conurbations are governed by metropolitan boroughs. Across large parts of the country, local councils have also grouped into strategic administrative bodies known as combined authorities, many of which are governed directly by an elected metro mayor. The lowest tier of local government consists of civil parishes, which manage localised hyper-local amenities.

The contemporary framework for English devolution began with the Greater London Authority Act 1999, which established the London Assembly and the directly elected Mayor of London in 2000. Outside the capital, the model was expanded via the Localism Act 2011 and the Cities and Local Government Devolution Act 2016. These statutes enabled the creation of combined authorities, which allowed neighbouring local councils to pool resources and form strategic administrative bodies. To secure maximum funding and powers over strategic planning, infrastructure, and skills, central government required these authorities to adopt a directly elected metro mayor. Initially concentrated in major urban conurbations—such as the Greater Manchester Combined Authority and the West Midlands Combined Authority—the mayoral system gradually expanded into mixed urban and rural territories. By the mid-2020s, more than half of England's population lived under some form of devolved mayoral authority.

== Natural resources ==
England is a great wind power

There are several natural resources available in the geology and environment of England which have contributed to the country’s industrial growth in the past and the UK's economy today. These include rich deposits of industrial minerals and aggregates such as limestone, chalk, gypsum, rock salt, silica, and specially china and ball clays, which still represent valuable exports for the country. Metal mining, such as the extraction of tin, copper, lead, and iron ores, has its roots in the Bronze Age and played an instrumental part in the success of the Industrial Revolution, but now is limited mostly to small productions and experiments.

Among energy resources, England used to depend on huge deposits of coal, but coal-based electricity generation was abandoned for good in the United Kingdom in September 2024. However, both onshore and offshore fields of the North Sea supply the fossil fuels for England, whereas the emphasis has been rapidly switched to zero-carbon resources like wind and solar energy production. Besides minerals, the fertile soils of England support agriculture that includes cattle farming.

According to the Office for National Statistics (ONS), England is home to 85 percent of the UK's farmland. The country accounts for 84 percent of the total financial value of the UK's provision of agricultural biomass services. England's eastern coastal region boasts of a unique shallow seabed, for instance, the Dogger Bank. Because of this factor, engineers can easily install wind turbine structures in the seabed without needing expensive floating installations. For that reason, the biggest offshore wind farms in the world exist in England, and these include Dogger Bank Wind Farm and Hornsea. The Fens and East Anglia boast the richest peat soils in Europe, making it a key region for agriculture. This fertile land allows the UK to produce a significant portion of its arable crops, including staples like wheat, barley, and sugar beet. The Viking Link is the longest land and submarine power interconnector in the world, linking the power networks of England and Denmark by transferring surplus energy, especially wind energy.

England has some significant deposits of onshore oil (for example, Wytch Farm oil field located in Dorset, which is considered to be the largest onshore oil field in Europe). In terms of total renewable capacity, England comes first in the United Kingdom, having about 2.5 times more renewable energy capacity than Scotland. 86% of solar PV capacity in the United Kingdom belongs to England due to its geographical advantage in the south where there is more sunshine. This region is perfect for hosting big solar farms as well as smaller roof installations. Bioenergy in the United Kingdom represents 88% of England's energy capacity owing to large power stations such as the one in Yorkshire called Drax Power Station.

North Sea oil and gas infrastructure in England plays a vital logistical and processing role within the broader United Kingdom Continental Shelf (UKCS) energy sector. While the vast majority of the UK's northern and central offshore oil reserves are located closer to Scotland, the Southern North Sea—geographically adjacent to the eastern coast of England—is predominantly characterised by extensive natural gas fields. The historical development of North Sea oil is tied directly to English infrastructure; the UK's first major offshore oil pipeline system came online in 1975, delivering crude oil from the Forties oil field directly to a major terminal at Teesside. Terminal facilities along the English coast, including major hubs at Easington and Bacton, remain critical for receiving, processing, and distributing hydrocarbons from both domestic fields and undersea pipelines connected to continental Europe. As production from the mature basin continues its long-term structural decline, these English onshore installations are increasingly transitioning to support carbon capture and storage (CCS) initiatives and offshore wind integration.

Although not as wooded as Scotland, England is rich in timber resources and includes vast managed plantations of sitka spruce and pine such as Kielder Forest in Northumberland. An extensive river system (Thames, Severn, and Trent among others) and huge underground chalk aquifers make available clean drinking water and power industry. The English coastal waters serve as important fishery areas, providing a plentiful supply of crabs, lobsters, plaice, and sole. The expansive downlands of Southern England, including the North and South Downs as well as the Chilterns, are home to nearly all of the UK's chalk resources. This chalk is crucial for producing cement and agricultural lime in the UK.

== See also ==
- North-South divide in England
- Geography of the United Kingdom
- Geography of Scotland
- Geography of Wales
- Geology of England
- Climate of England
- List of islands of England
- List of rivers of England
- List of lakes of England
- Economy of England
- Lake District
- Pennines
- Northern England
- Southern England
- North Sea
