= Tees–Exe line =

Imaginary line which roughly divides Great Britain into lowland and upland regions

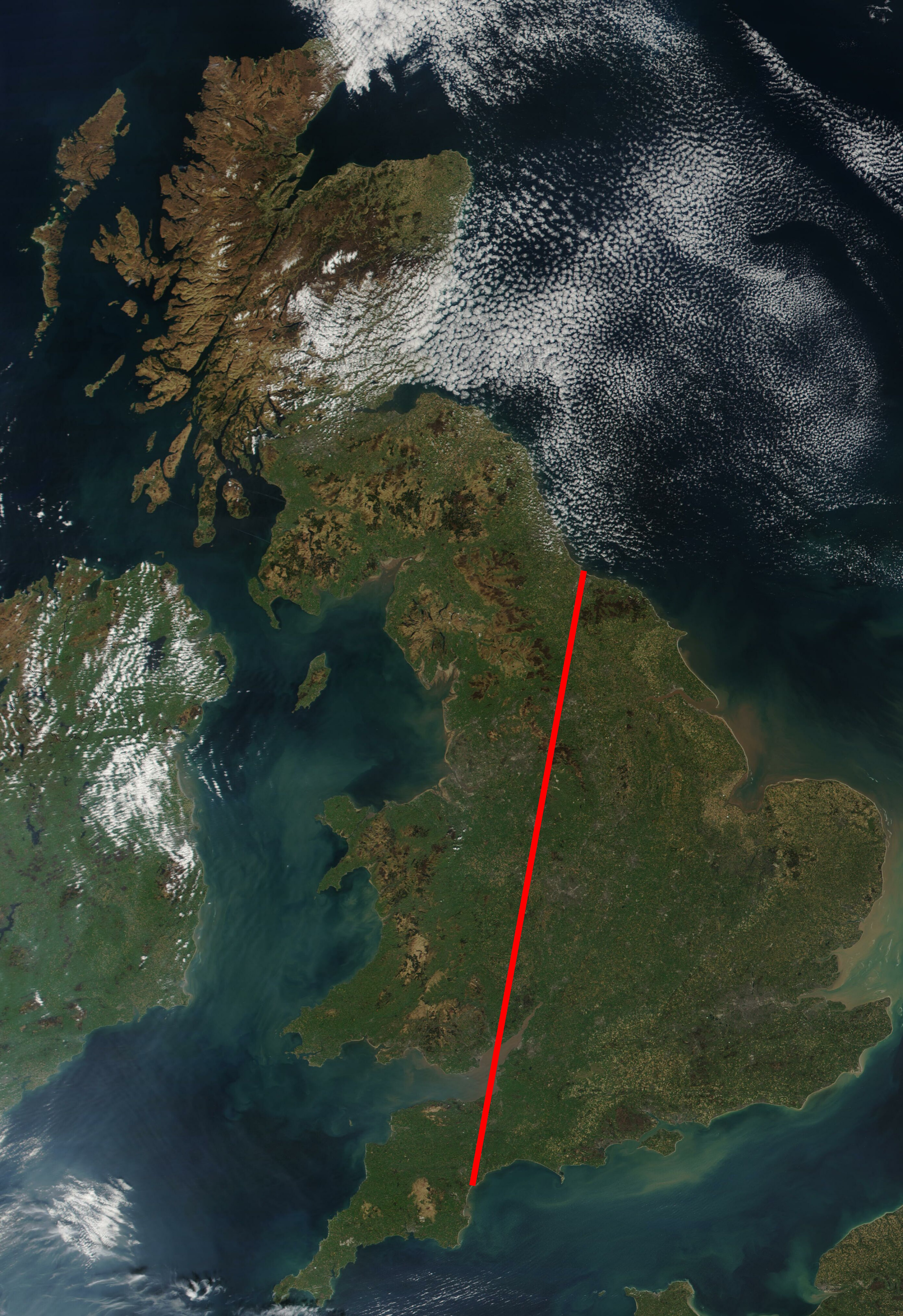
Tees–Exe Line

The Tees–Exe line is a northeast-southwest line that can be drawn on a map of Great Britain which roughly divides the island into lowland and upland regions.

The line links the mouth of the River Tees between Redcar and Hartlepool in the north east of England with the mouth of the River Exe in Devon in the south west. To the south and east of this line, the landscape, whilst not always flat, is mostly lower and is characterised by flat-lying or gently tilted or folded sedimentary rocks. North and west of this line are the older, generally harder rocks including igneous and metamorphic rocks and the Palaeozoic and Precambrian sandstones and limestones which usually stand out as upland areas. The areas to the north and west of the line also have a generally wetter climate than areas to the east and south. The varying ease of agriculture above and below this line historically has left a visible effect on the population density of the UK, with a concentration of settlements in the south-east.

Other lines can be drawn, for similar purposes, between the Severn Estuary and the Wash, and between the Severn and the mouth of the River Trent. The Cross Country Route follows the line by railway along most of the length.

== See also ==
- Geology of the United Kingdom
- Lloegyr
- Heihe-Tengchong line
