= Outline of Wales =

Overview of and topical guide to Wales

Flag of Wales

Flag of St David

Historic coat of arms of Llywelyn the Great

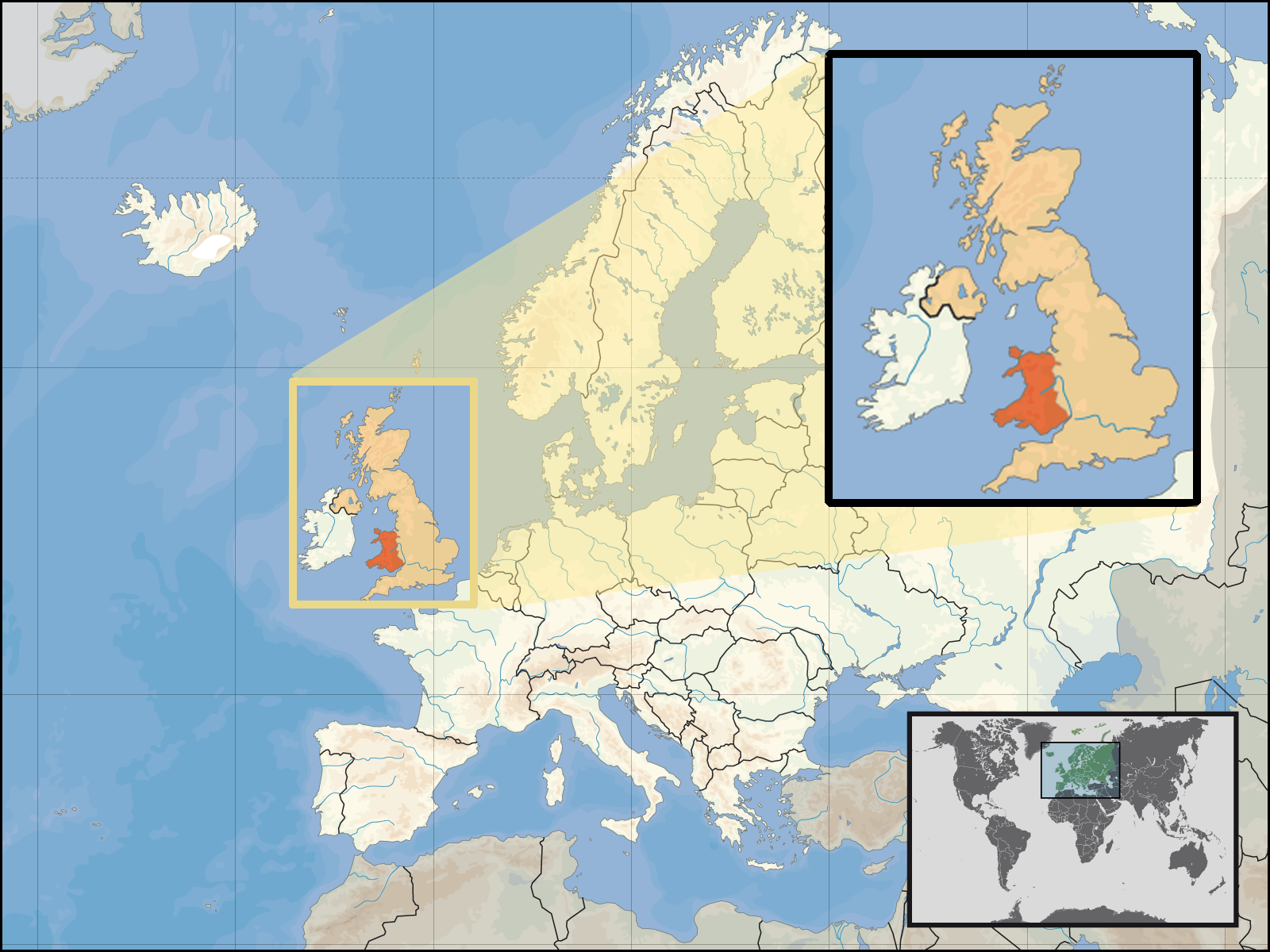
Location of Wales (orange)
– in the European continent (camel & white)
– in the United Kingdom (camel)

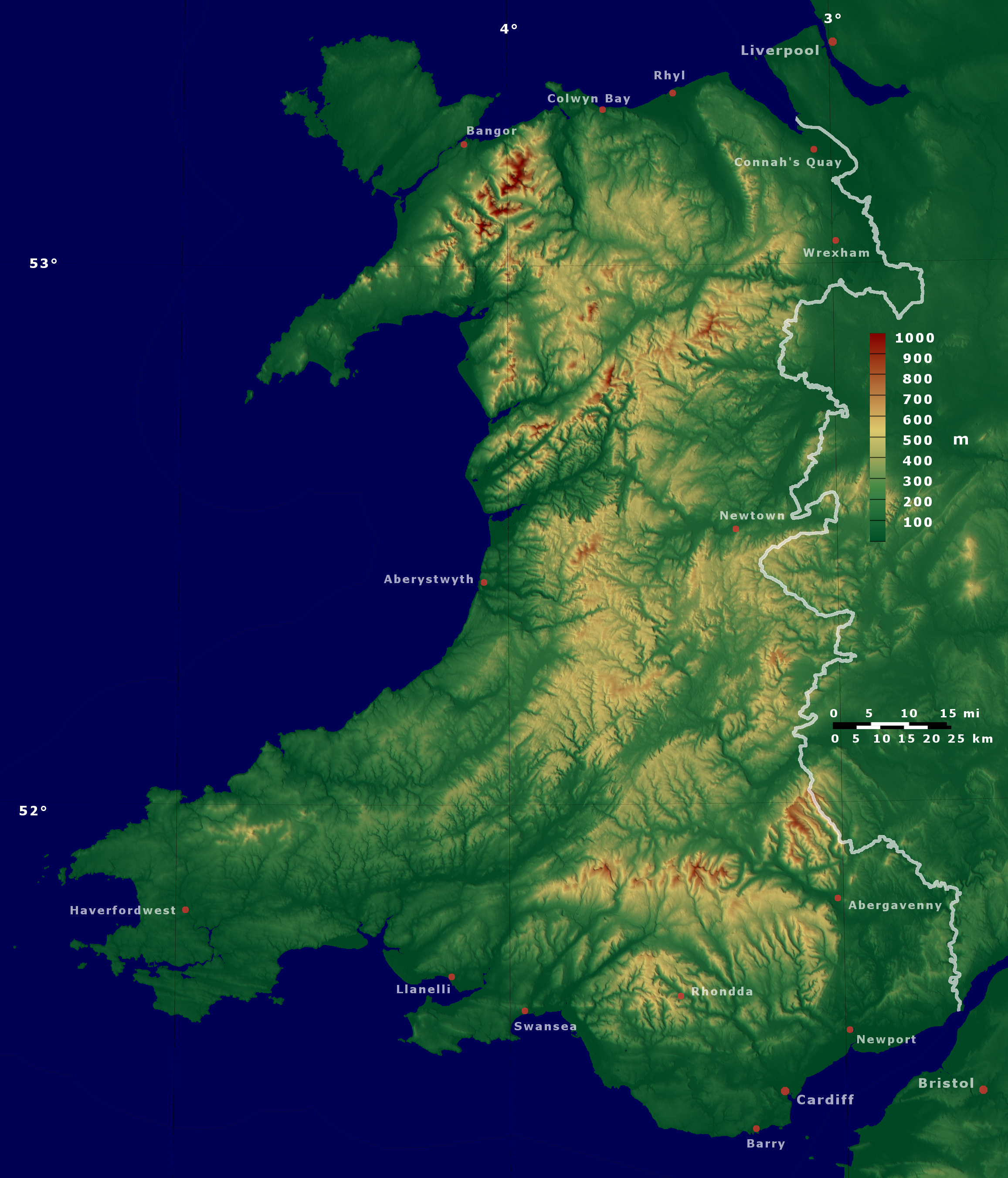
Enlargeable relief map of Wales

The following outline is provided as an overview of and topical guide to Wales:

Wales – a country that is part of the United Kingdom, bordered by England to its east and the Atlantic Ocean and Irish Sea to its west. It has an estimated population of three million and the Welsh and English languages are both official languages. The Welsh language is an important element of Welsh culture. Its decline has reversed over recent years, with Welsh speakers estimated to be around 20 per cent of the population of Wales.

== General reference ==
- Pronunciation: /ˈweɪlz/
- Etymology of "Wales"
- Common English country name(s): Wales
- Official English country name(s): Wales
- Common endonym(s): Cymru
- Official endonym(s): Cymru
- Adjectival(s): Welsh
- Demonym(s): Welsh

== Geography ==
Geography

- Wales is a country that is part of the United Kingdom.
- Location
  - Atlantic Ocean
  - Northern Hemisphere
  - Eurasia (but not on the mainland)
    - Europe
      - Northern Europe and Western Europe
        - British Isles
          - Great Britain (the central southern part of the island's western side)
          - Several other islands of Wales, the largest being Anglesey
  - Extreme points of Wales
- Population of Wales: 2,999,300 (2009 estimate)
- Area of Wales: 20,779 km^{2} (8,023 sq mi)
- Atlas of Wales

=== Environment ===
Environment of Wales

- Climate of Wales
- Ecology of Wales
  - Renewable energy in Wales
- Environmental issues in Wales
- Geology of Wales
- Protected areas of Wales
  - Biosphere reserves in Wales
  - National parks of Wales
  - AONBs in Wales
- Wildlife of Wales
  - Flora of Wales
  - Fauna of Wales
    - Birds of Wales
    - Mammals of Wales
      - List of Welsh breeds

==== Natural geographic features ====
- Islands of Wales
- Lakes of Wales
- Mountains of Wales
  - Volcanoes in Wales
- Rivers of Wales
  - Waterfalls of Wales
- South Wales Valleys
- World Heritage Sites in Wales

=== Regions ===
Regions of Wales; common models:

- Two region model:
  - North Wales
  - South Wales
- Four region model:
  - North Wales
  - Mid Wales
  - South West Wales
  - South East Wales

Other models exist

- Economic regions of Wales
- List of ecoregions in Wales

==== Administrative divisions ====
Administrative divisions of Wales

- Local government in Wales
  - Cities of Wales
  - Towns in Wales
  - Communities of Wales
- Preserved counties of Wales
- Historic counties of Wales

===== Local government =====
Local government in Wales

- Blaenau Gwent
- Bridgend County Borough
- Caerphilly County Borough
- Cardiff
- Carmarthenshire
- Ceredigion
- Conwy County Borough
- Denbighshire
- Flintshire
- Gwynedd
- Isle of Anglesey
- Merthyr Tydfil County Borough
- Monmouthshire
- Neath Port Talbot
- Newport
- Pembrokeshire
- Powys
- Rhondda Cynon Taf
- Swansea
- Torfaen
- Vale of Glamorgan
- Wrexham County Borough

===== Preserved counties =====
Preserved counties of Wales

- Clwyd
- Dyfed
- Gwent
- Gwynedd
- Mid Glamorgan
- Powys
- South Glamorgan
- West Glamorgan

===== Historic counties =====
Historic counties of Wales

- Anglesey
- Brecknockshire
- Cardiganshire
- Caernarfonshire
- Carmarthenshire
- Denbighshire
- Flintshire
- Glamorgan
- Merionethshire
- Monmouthshire
- Montgomeryshire
- Pembrokeshire
- Radnorshire

===== Former Districts =====
Districts of Wales

===== Cities =====
Cities of Wales

- Capital of Wales: Cardiff

=== Demography ===
Demographics of Wales

== Government and politics ==
Politics of Wales

- Form of government:
- Capital of Wales: Cardiff
- Elections in Wales
- Political parties in Wales
- Welsh nationalism
- Welsh devolution
- Welsh unionism
- Welsh separatism
- Welsh republicanism

=== Branches of the government ===
Government of Wales

==== Executive ====
- Head of government: First Minister of Wales
  - List of first ministers of Wales
- Welsh Government
- Wales Office (Department of UK Government) – it is primarily responsible for carrying out the few functions remaining with the Secretary of State for Wales that have not been transferred already to the Senedd; and for securing funds for Wales as part of the annual budgetary settlement.
  - Secretary of State for Wales

==== Legislative ====
- Senedd (the Welsh Parliament; Senedd Cymru) (devolved unicameral)

==== Judicial ====
- Supreme Court of the United Kingdom
- Courts of England and Wales

=== Law and order in Wales ===
- English law – the law currently in force in England and Wales.
- Contemporary Welsh Law
- Human rights in Wales
  - LGBT rights in Wales
- Law enforcement in Wales
- Medieval Welsh law (historical)

=== Military ===
Military of Wales within the Military of the United Kingdom

- Command
  - Commander-in-chief:
    - Charles III
- Forces
  - British Army
  - Royal Navy
  - Royal Air Force
- Military history of the United Kingdom
  - Military history of Wales
- Military ranks of the United Kingdom

=== Local government in Wales ===
Local government in Wales

- History of local government in Wales

== History ==
History of Wales

- Timeline of Welsh history
- Bibliography of Welsh history
- Current events of Wales

=== History of Wales, by period ===
- List of years in Wales
- Prehistoric Wales
- Wales in the Roman era
- Wales in the Early Middle Ages
- Norman invasion of Wales
- Wales in the High Middle Ages
- Wales in the Late Middle Ages
- Early modern period in Wales
- Industrial Revolution in Wales
- Welsh settlement in the Americas
- Wales in the World Wars
- Modern history of Wales

=== History of Wales, by region ===
- Kingdoms of Wales
  - Brycheiniog
  - Kingdom of Ceredigion
  - Deheubarth
  - Kingdom of Dyfed
  - Ergyng
  - Kingdom of Gwent
  - Kingdom of Gwynedd
  - Glywysing
  - Powys
    - Powys Wenwynwyn
    - Powys Fadog
  - Seisyllwg

=== History of Wales, by subject ===
- List of rulers of Wales
- Medieval Welsh law

== Culture ==
Culture of Wales

- Cultural relationship between the Welsh and the English
- Architecture of Wales
  - List of Welsh architects
  - Cadw properties
  - Castles in Wales
  - Cathedrals in Wales
  - Country houses in Wales
  - Hill forts in Wales
  - Listed buildings in Wales
  - Monastic houses in Wales
  - National Trust properties in Wales
- Cuisine of Wales
- Ethnic minorities in Wales
- Festivals in Wales
  - List of food festivals in Wales
  - Traditional festival days of Wales
- Languages of Wales
  - Welsh English
  - Welsh language
    - History of the Welsh language
  - Welsh placenames
- Media in Wales
  - Radio in Wales
- National symbols of Wales
  - Coat of arms of Wales
  - Flag of Wales
  - Flag of St David
  - National anthem of Wales
- People of Wales
- Prostitution in Wales
- Public holidays in Wales
- World Heritage Sites in Wales

=== Art in Wales ===
- Art in Wales
- Cinema of Wales
- Welsh literature
  - Welsh-language literature
  - Welsh literature in English
- Music of Wales
- Television in Wales
- Theatre in Wales
  - List of theatres in Wales

=== Religion in Wales ===
Religion in Wales

- Buddhism in Wales
- Christianity in Wales
  - Evangelical Movement of Wales
- Hinduism in Wales
- Islam in Wales
- Judaism in Wales
- Sikhism in Wales
- Irreligion in Wales

=== Sport in Wales ===
Sport in Wales

- Boxing in Wales
- Cricket in Wales
- Football in Wales
- Rugby league in Wales
- Rugby union in Wales
- Baseball in Wales

== Economy and infrastructure ==
Economy of Wales

- Economic rank (by nominal GDP):
- Agriculture in Wales
- Banking in Wales
- Communications in Wales
  - Internet in Wales
- Companies of Wales
- Currency of Wales: Pound Sterling
- Economic history of Wales
- Energy in Wales
  - Energy policy of Wales
  - Oil industry in Wales
- Food and drink industry of Wales
  - Welsh cuisine
  - Beer in Wales
- Forestry in Wales
- Healthcare in Wales
- Social care in Wales
- Manufacturing in Wales
- Mining in Wales
- Science and technology in Wales
  - List of Welsh inventions and discoveries
  - List of Welsh inventors
- Stock exchanges in the United Kingdom
- Tourism in Wales
  - List of tourist attractions in Wales
- Transport in Wales
  - Airports in Wales
  - Rail transport in Wales
  - Roads in Wales
    - Trunk roads in Wales
- Water supply and sanitation in Wales
  - Reservoirs of Wales
- Welsh Automotive Forum

== Education in Wales ==
Education in Wales

- Primary education in Wales
- Secondary education in Wales
- Medical education in Wales
- Further Education in Wales
- Universities in Wales

== See also ==
- Outline of England
- Outline of Scotland
- Outline of Northern Ireland
- Outline of the Republic of Ireland
- List of basic geography topics
