= Cwmni Theatr Arad Goch =

Welsh theatre company

- Arad Goch
- Founded: 1989
- Founders: Jeremy Turner, Mari Rhian Owen, Mair Tomos Ifans, Siôr Llyfni, Ellen ap Gwynn and Catrin Hughes
- Type: Theatre company
- Headquarters: Aberystwyth, Wales
- Artistic director: Ffion Wyn Bowen
- Website: aradgoch.cymru

Cwmni Theatr Arad Goch (commonly known as Arad Goch) is a Welsh theatre company based in Aberystwyth, Wales. Established in 1989, the company specialises in theatre for children and young people and produces Welsh-language and bilingual productions that tour throughout Wales and internationally.

The company is recognised as one of Wales' leading providers of theatre for young audiences.

== Establishment ==
Arad Goch was founded in 1989 through the merger of Theatr Crwban, the first Welsh-language theatre-in-education company, and the experimental theatre company Cwmni Cyfri Tri. The company was established by Jeremy Turner, Mari Rhian Owen, Mair Tomos Ifans, Siôr Llyfni, Ellen ap Gwynn and Catrin Hughes. It was incorporated on 24 April 1989 under the name Arad Goch Cwmni Theatr Dyfed. The organisation initially operated from an old barn on Alexandra Road. Later, a chapel on Baddon Street was converted into an arts centre and the company used this space.

Over subsequent decades the company developed a national touring programme and became an important contributor to theatre for young audiences in Wales.

== Activities ==
Arad Goch creates theatre productions for children, young people and families, presenting work in schools, theatres and community venues. The company produces several new productions each year and performs to more than 24,000 children and young people annually.

The organisation has collaborated with Welsh police and crime commissioners on their crime prevention education programme and produced work on the theme of anti-bullying. During the COVID-19 pandemic in Wales, the organisation worked with schools to make digital educational resources available.

Arad Goch has developed international partnerships and has toured productions outside Wales, including performances in Pakistan and participation in international festivals for young audiences.

=== Agor Drysau Festival ===
Since 1996, Arad Goch has organised Agor Drysau (Opening Doors), an international festival of performing arts for young audiences held in Aberystwyth. The biennial festival presents performances from Wales and around the world and provides opportunities for international collaboration, networking and artistic exchange. The festival celebrated its tenth edition in 2024.

== Leadership ==
In 2024, founder and long-serving Artistic Director Jeremy Turner retired after leading the company since its establishment. Following the retirement of Jeremy Turner, actor and director Ffion Wyn Bowen was appointed Artistic Director in 2024. She previously worked with the company as an actor, director and facilitator, having first joined Arad Goch in 1996.

== Funding ==
In 2018-19, Arad Goch received £25,000 from the Community Facilities Programme of the Senedd. In 2024, the company secured funding from Arts Council Wales.

== Archives ==
The company's archive, documenting more than 35 years of work, was deposited with the National Library of Wales in 2026.

== See also ==
- Theatre in Wales
- Theatre for young audiences
- Aberystwyth
