= Lady Park Wood National Nature Reserve =

Nature reserve in England and Wales

Lady Park Wood NNR
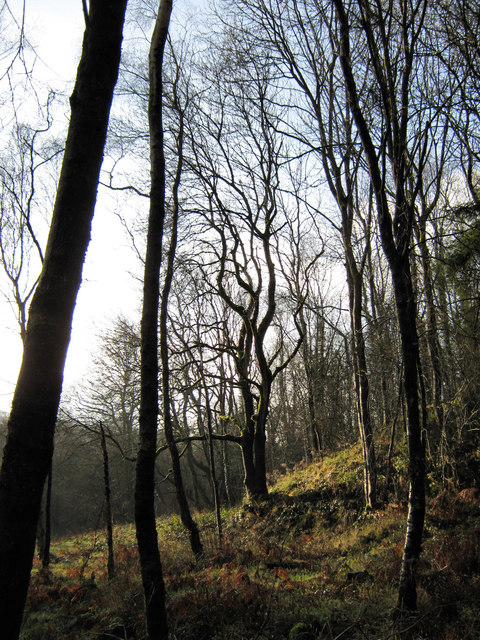
- Winter in Lady Park Wood

- Location within Monmouthshire
- Type: Privately owned with rights of way
- Location: Borders of England & Wales
- Coordinates: 51°49′37.2″N 2°39′36″W
- Area: 110 acres (45 ha)
- Status: Open all year

Lady Park Wood National Nature Reserve (grid reference SO546144) is a 45-hectare (110-acre) nature reserve straddling the borders of Gloucestershire in England and Monmouthshire in Wales. Most of the wood is in Wales – where it forms Wales' easternmost point – but it is managed under agreement with Natural England.

The wood is in the Wye Valley Area of Outstanding Natural Beauty. It is part of the Upper Wye Gorge Site of Special Scientific Interest (SSSI) and the River Wye Special Area of Conservation (SAC). The site is owned by the Forestry Commission and access is on recognised rights of way. Permits are needed to access non-public areas. The wood has been a research location for some time as unmanaged woodland and is a prime woodland conservation area. It is notable as being the easternmost point of Wales.

The wood take its name from the estate to which it formerly belonged, which was built up chiefly between about 1580 and 1650 by the Hall family of the now demolished High Meadow House. The woods were inherited by Viscount Gage in 1719 and purchased by the Crown in 1817. There is a gated small cave (part mine) in the wood, located near the Biblins campsite.

== Location and habitat ==
The reserve is considered to be one of the most important sites for woodland conservation in the United Kingdom and lies on the southern side of a gorge formed by the winding River Wye. Located halfway between Monmouth and Ross-on-Wye, it is part of the long stretch of woodland which fringes the lower part of the Wye Valley and then joins the Forest of Dean. The nearest community is Symonds Yat.

In response to criticism of its afforestation programmes in 1938, the Forestry Commission offered ecologists the opportunity to set up research reserves on its land. With the support of Eustace Jones of the University of Oxford Forestry department, the only such reserve that was established in the UK was at Lady Park Wood. The reserve was established in 1944, and has been surveyed on a regular basis since then. In 1945, the wood consisted of old stands that had been coppiced in 1870 and thinned in 1902 and the 1920s. All were then allowed to grow unmanaged. According to ecologist George Peterken, it was found that tree growth led to a decline in tree numbers, through increasing shade and browsing by deer, and, over time, disturbances such as Dutch elm disease in the 1970s, and a late snowfall in 1983 had increasingly disproportionate impacts on the woodland. It was found that "there was no single natural composition; rather, the natural mixture would fluctuate between beech dominance and ash-lime dominance according to the chance impacts of various disturbances." In recent years the woodland has become overrun by fallow deer and grey squirrels — both non-native species — affecting the regrowth of its trees.

The Welsh part of the wood is the Easternmost point in Wales; it is further East than English places such as Hereford, Leominster and Shrewsbury.

== Flora ==
The woodland is of beech, oak, ash, small-leaved lime and large-leaved lime. There is also birch, field maple, aspen, yew, holly, whitebeam, alder and other species. The understorey is dominated by hazel and includes dogwood, hawthorn and other species typical of the area.

The ground flora includes dog's mercury and bramble and other species recorded include wild madder, toothwort, lily-of-the-valley, herb paris, and bird's-nest orchid.

== Fauna ==
The area has a rich bird community, including all three native woodpecker species and the tawny owl. Other species include common redstart, wood warbler, pied flycatcher and treecreeper.

The Forest of Dean and the Wye Valley are known areas for supporting the bat populations, and there are several Sites of Special Scientific Interest notified in England and in Wales for their protection. There are breeding sites, hibernation sites and the large tracts of woodland provide a rich feeding area. Significant numbers of the rarer bat species – lesser horseshoe bat and greater horseshoe bat – have been recorded in Lady Park Wood. The Wye Valley and Forest of Dean Bat Sites (Safleoedd Ystlumod Dyffryn Gwy a Fforest y Ddena) are designated a Special Area of Conservation.

== Sources ==
- Natural England description of Lady Park Wood NNR
- Natural England map of the NNR
- Countryside Council for Wales information on Lady Park Wood NNR
