= Ivy Bush Royal Hotel =

Hotel in Carmarthen, South Wales

Coordinates: 51.8565°N 4.3034°W

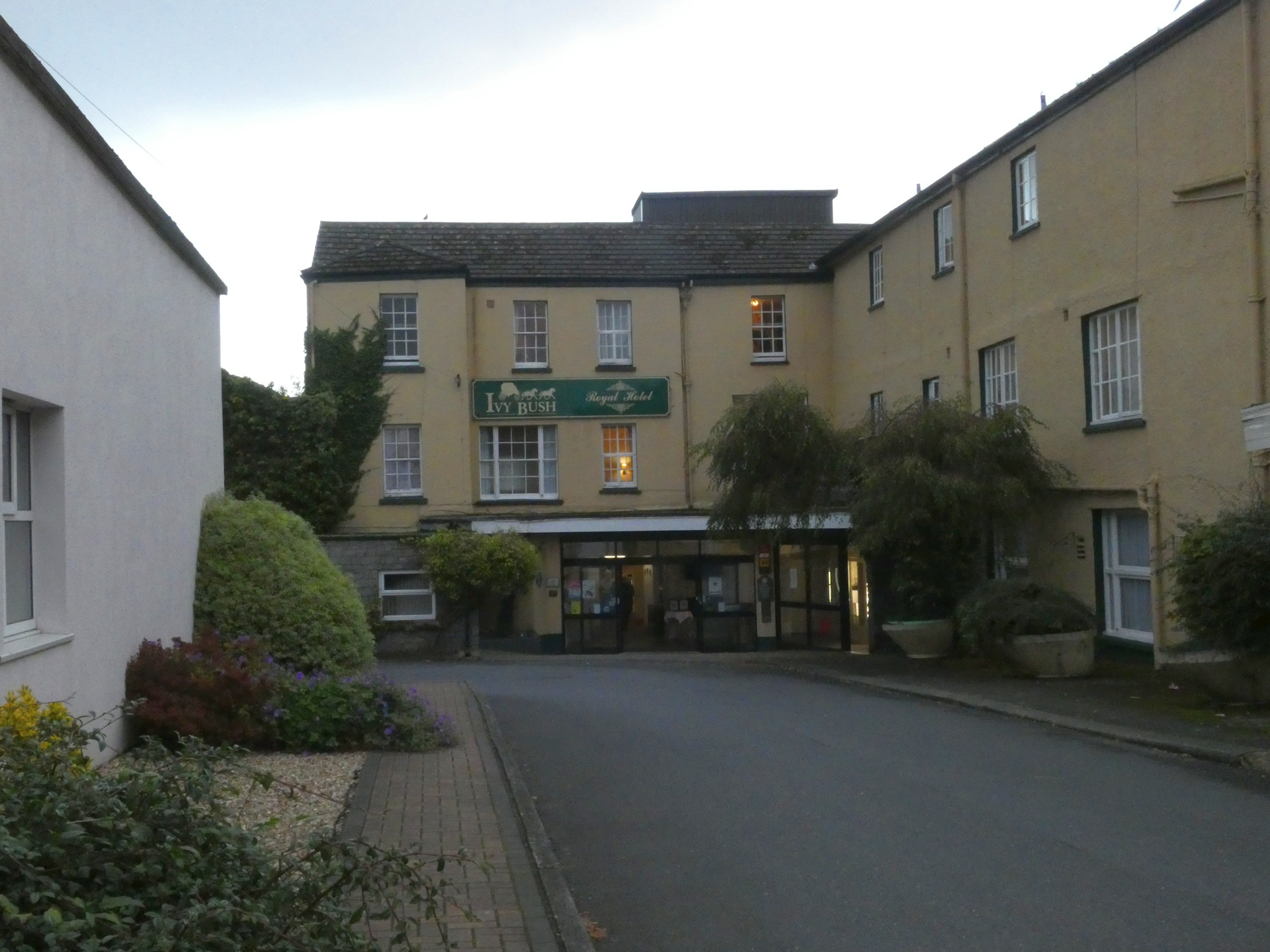
- Former names: Ivy Bush Inn, Royal Ivy Bush

General information
- Location: 11 Spillman Street, Carmarthen, Wales

The Ivy Bush Royal Hotel is a hotel in Carmarthen, South Wales. It was the site of the first eisteddfod attended by the Gorsedd.

== History ==
The inn was built in the 18th century.

=== The Old Ivy Bush ===
An inn on King Street was known as the Ivy Bush until 1801. From 1794, it was run by William Nott's father. After the opening of the Ivy Bush Inn on Spillman Street, it became known as the Old Ivy Bush.

The site of the Old Ivy Bush is now occupied by the Lyric Theatre.

=== 1819 eisteddfod ===
The 1819 eisteddfod in Carmarthen was the first post-Napoleonic-War revival eisteddfod, known as the provincial eisteddfodau. It was the first eisteddfod attended by the Gorsedd. The Gorsedd ceremony took place at the Ivy Bush coaching inn. Iolo Morgannwg, creator of the Gorsedd of the Bards, created a druidic stone circle on the Ivy Bush's lawn.

=== Late Georgian & early Victorian history ===
The Ivy Bush was the site of many important events for the town. The inn hosted the freemasons who attended the ceremony of laying the foundation stone for the Picton Monument in 1825. When the Duchess of Clarence visited Carmarthen during her visit to Stackpole Court in 1827, she had lunch at the Ivy Bush Inn, meeting the Mayor of Carmarthen and other town officials.

The inn was used as a coach house and posting house. In 1830, coaches left from the Ivy Bush to London, Bristol, Haverfordwest and Swansea. By 1844, they also went to Gloucester. At the time the inn was run by George Davies.

=== Recent history ===
The hotel unveiled a commemorative window to the National Eisteddfod in 1974.

In 1986, an area covering most of the hotel's car park was designated a scheduled monument due to the Roman fort buried beneath it.

In 2018, Paul & Ann Jaycock sold the hotel to Compass Hospitality. The couple retired after owning the hotel for 28 years.

== Present day ==
The Ivy Bush Royal Hotel hosts corporate events, such as conferences and exhibitions, as well as weddings and private parties. It has a highly-rated restaurant.
