= List of theatres in Wales =

The following is a list of active theatres and concert halls in Wales. They are organised alphabetically in name order.

Note that in rural areas, church halls and town halls may double up as theatres, and that many colleges and universities also have their own auditoria.

Welsh and English names are listed according to their descriptor.

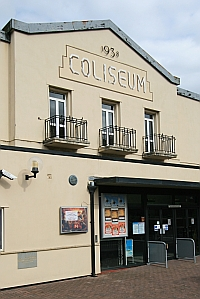
Coliseum Theatre, Aberdare

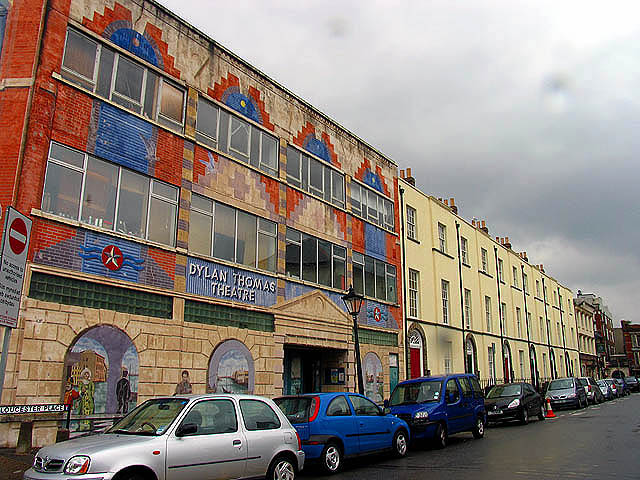
Dylan Thomas Theatre

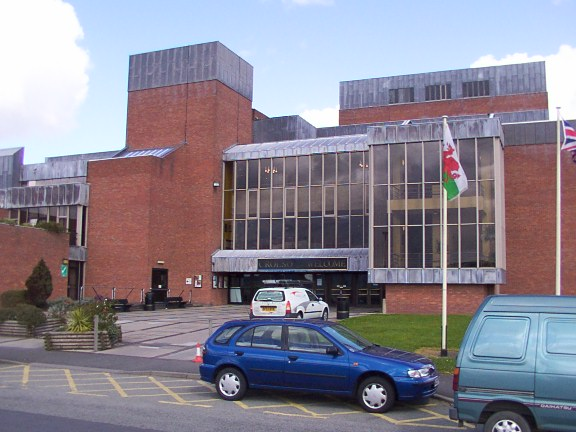
Theatr Clwyd

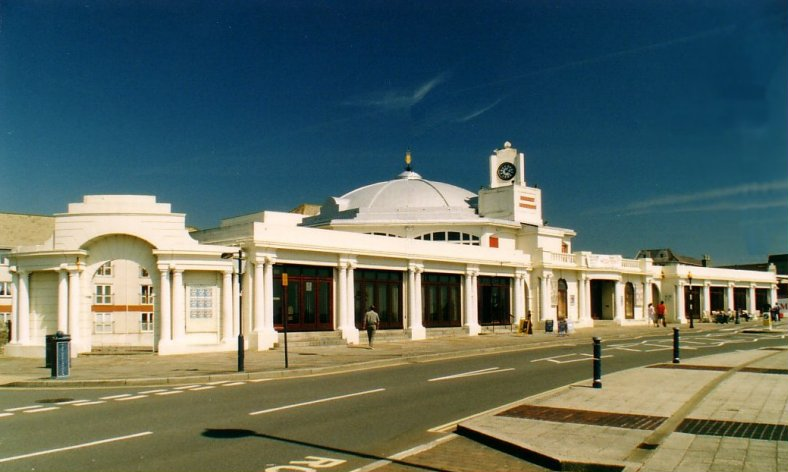
The Grand Pavilion

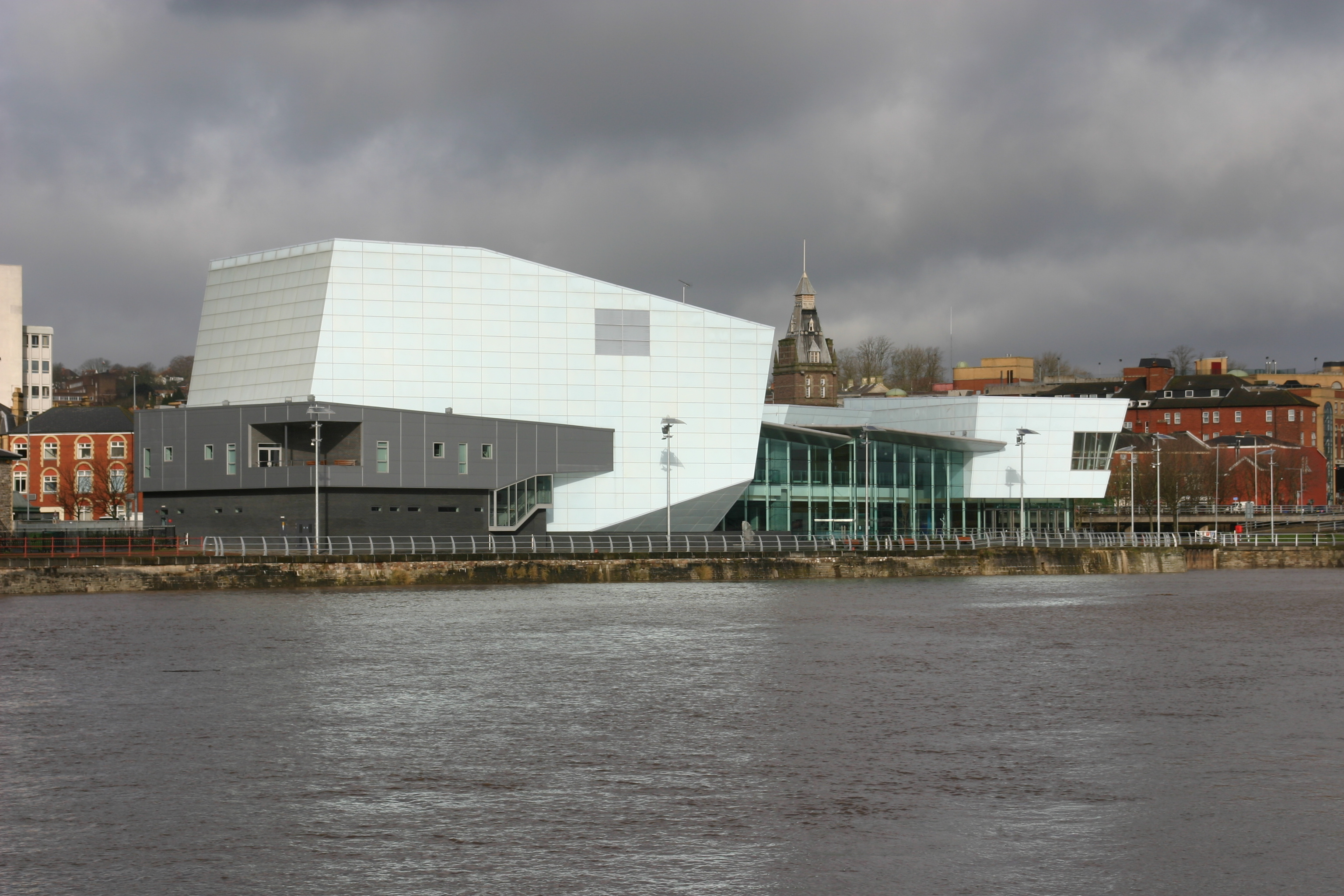
Riverfront Arts Centre

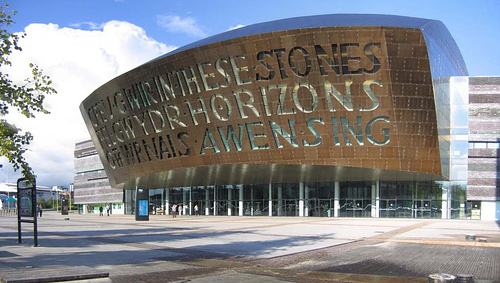
Wales Millennium Centre

== A ==
- Aberystwyth Arts Centre
- Adelina Patti Theatre, Craig-y-Nos Castle near Swansea
- The Albert Hall, Llandrindod Wells

== B ==
- Beaufort Theatre, Blaenau Gwent
- Borough Theatre, Abergavenny
- Brangwyn Hall, Swansea
- Theatr Brycheiniog, Brecon

== C ==
- Caerleon amphitheatre, a ruined Roman venue
- Canolfan Soar, Merthyr Tydfil
- Capitol Theatre, Cardiff
- Cardiff Empire
- Carmarthen Public Rooms
- Chapter Arts Centre, Cardiff
- Coliseum Theatre, Aberdare
- Congress Theatre, Torfaen

== D ==
- Dirty Protest Theatre
- Dolman Theatre, Newport
- Dylan Thomas Theatre, Swansea

== F ==
- Theatr Felinfach, Ystrad Aeron near Lampeter

== G ==
- The Gate Arts Centre, Cardiff
- Grand Pavilion, Porthcawl
- Grand Theatre, Swansea
- Theatr Gwaun, Fishguard

== H ==
- Halliwell Theatre, Carmarthen
- Theatr Hafren, Newtown, Powys

== L ==
- The Little Theatre, Tredegar
- Llandudno Pier Pavilion Theatre
- Lyric Theatre, Carmarthen
- The Little Theatre Rhyl

== N ==
- New Theatre, Cardiff

== P ==
- Parc and Dare Hall, Treorchy
- Patti Pavilion, Swansea
- The Princess Royal Theatre, Port Talbot
- The Point, Cardiff
- Powys Theatre, Newtown

== Q ==
- Queens Hall, Narberth

== R ==
- Riverfront Arts Centre, Newport

== S ==
- Savoy Theatre, Monmouth
- Sherman Cymru, Cardiff
- St David's Hall, Cardiff

== T ==
- The Tabernacle, Machynlleth
- Taliesin Arts Centre, Swansea
- Theatr Clwyd, Mold, Flintshire
- Torch Theatre, Milford Haven
- Townhill Theatre, Swansea

== V ==
- Venue Cymru, Llandudno

== W ==
- Wales Millennium Centre, Cardiff
- Willow Globe Theatre, Powys

== See also ==
- Theatre of Wales
