= Science and technology in Wales =

Science in Wales - a video by the Welsh Government, 2015

Various science and technology sectors and organisations operate in Wales.

== Government ==
The Wales Science and Innovation Advisory Council gives advice to the Chief Scientific Adviser for Wales on science, innovation and business policy for Wales but does not have any statutory or financial responsibilities. Members of the council include individuals involved in research and innovation, academics and those involved in industry.

== Science ==
=== Research ===
- From 2010 to 2018, Welsh researchers accounted for 4% of UK publications and 0.3% of global scholarly output.
- Wales is the most efficient of all its comparators in terms of output per expenditure.
- Wales' research and development funding now accounts for 62% of total expenditure.
- Wales's citation impact has risen to 1.8. This is 80% above the global average and 13% above the UK average.
- Wales' proportion of top 5% of the most cited publications is twice the global average.

=== Health ===
Health and Care Research Wales is a networked organisation, supported by Welsh Government, which brings together a wide range of partners across the NHS in Wales, universities and research institutions, local authorities, and others.

The organisations works in close partnership with other government agencies and research funders (both in Wales and across the UK); industry partners; patients; public and other stakeholders. Work together to promote research into diseases, treatments, services and outcomes that can lead to discoveries and innovations which can improve and even save people's lives.

=== Food ===
The Food Industry Centre (FIC) at Cardiff Metropolitan University (also known as UWIC) is a Welsh research and education organisation designed to address issues of food safety and food-related health concerns. Its mission also includes supporting the Welsh food industry. The centre, which is part of UWIC's Cardiff School of Health Sciences at the university's Llandaff campus, was launched in 1999. A new facility for the centre opened on 21 April 2009 and was built at a cost of £5,000,000.

== Technology industries ==
=== Aerospace ===
The Aerospace Wales Forum is the trade association for companies that work in the Aerospace & Defence sector in Wales.

- Hawker 800 XP, the Airbus plant in Broughton builds the fuselage and wings for the Hawker 800XP variant. This work employs about 450 people at the plant in North Wales.

=== Automotive ===
Wales is an important producer of automotive components: Ford had a major engine plant at Bridgend, and BorgWarner had a major components plant in Kenfig, South Wales. However amid a global cost-cutting drive and citing a lack of demand for its manufacturing capacity, Ford closed the plant in September 2020 and production of the Dragon engine is moving to Mexico.

The Welsh Automotive Forum, also known as WAF, is a limited company that lobbies the government on behalf of the automotive industry in Wales. It was formed in 1999.

=== Titanium: jet engines and medical applications ===
TIMET has a plant in Waunarlwydd, Swansea, which is one of the world's major suppliers of titanium for jet engine blades and medical applications.

=== Electronics ===
During the 1980s and 1990s, a major growth sector in manufacturing was the electronics industry with over 130 North American and 35 Japanese companies establishing operations in Wales. However, this is a characteristic of a "branch factory" economy where routine production is located in one region while higher skill activities are located in another.

=== Sustainable Technology ===
The Centre for Alternative Technology (CAT) (Welsh: Canolfan y Dechnoleg Amgen) is an eco-centre in Powys, mid-Wales, dedicated to demonstrating and teaching sustainable development. CAT, despite its name, no longer concentrates its efforts exclusively on alternative technology, but provides information on all aspects of sustainable living.

== See also ==
- List of Welsh innovations and discoveries
- Economy of Wales
