= Carmarthen Public Rooms =

Building in Carmarthen, Wales

Coordinates: 51.8567°N 4.3054°W

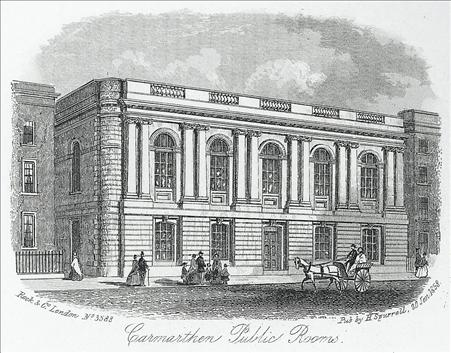
Carmarthen Public Rooms

The Carmarthen Public Rooms were built in 1854, with the intention to create public rooms were first expressed by Dr David Lloyd in 1839.

Commonly referred to as the "Assembly Rooms" the building was designed by James Wilson (architect) of Bath on the site of the Scurlock family town house, where Sir Richard Steele, founder of The Spectator, died in 1729. The site was occupied by The Ivy Bush Inn until c1801, and was then premises of the Timmins family, timber merchants.

The Assembly Rooms had a 5-bay, 2-storey Italianate stucco facade with balustraded parapet, cornice, arched first floor windows between paired pilasters, and channelled ground floor with recessed sash windows and centre door.

In 1918 an article appeared in the Carmarthen Journal stating that in future the Carmarthen 'Assembly Rooms' were to be called 'The Lyric'.

The original auditorium was located on the first floor at the front of the building. The impressive auditorium in use today exists to the rear of the entrance block and was built in 1936.

The Lyric is a theatre, one of the largest in West Wales and hosts theatre, touring productions, comedians and music. Since 2005, the Lyric has been owned by Carmarthenshire County Council. Prior to this the building was saved by a trust headed by Elizabeth Evans, who formed the Carmarthen and District Youth Opera.
