= Extreme points of Wales =

This is a list of the extreme points and extreme elevations in Wales.

== Wales ==
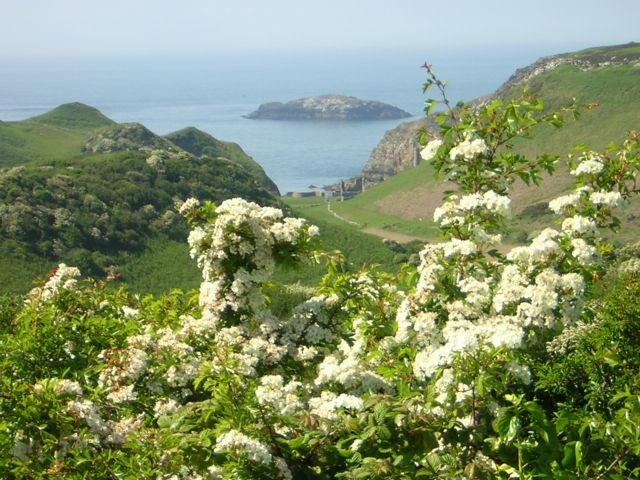
Middle Mouse (Ynys Badrig) as seen from Anglesey (Ynys Môn)

- Northernmost point – Middle Mouse, off Anglesey at 53°26′N 4°26′W
- Northernmost settlement – Cemaes Bay, Anglesey at 53°25′N 4°25′W
- Southernmost point – Flat Holm, Cardiff, off Lavernock Point, Vale of Glamorgan at 51°22′N 3°7′W
- Southernmost settlement – Rhoose, Vale of Glamorgan at 51°23′N 3°20′W
- Westernmost point – The Smalls, Pembrokeshire
- Westernmost settlement – Treginnis, Pembrokeshire at 51°52′N 5°18′W
- Easternmost point – Lady Park Wood, near Monmouth, Monmouthshire at 51°49′N 2°39′W
- The easternmost point of North Wales is a section of the Red Brook (which runs North-South into the Shropshire Union Canal near Whixall Mosses) at 52°57'24.8"N 2°43'26.7"W
- Easternmost settlement – Chepstow, Monmouthshire at 51°37′N 2°39′W

== Wales (mainland) ==
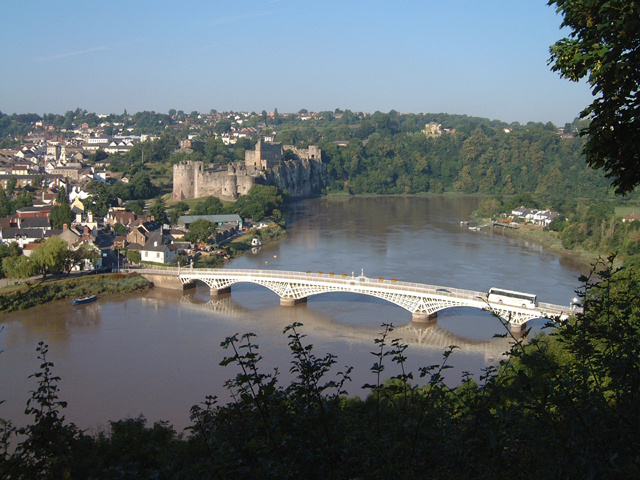
Chepstow showing border

- Northernmost point – Point of Ayr, Flintshire at 53°21′N 3°19′W
- Northernmost settlement – Talacre, Flintshire at 53°21′N 3°19′W
- Southernmost point – Breaksea Point, Vale of Glamorgan at 51°22′N 3°24′W
- Southernmost settlement – Rhoose, Vale of Glamorgan at 51°23′N 3°20′W
- Westernmost point – Pen Dal-aderyn, Pembrokeshire at 51°51′N 5°19′W
- Westernmost settlement – Treginnis, Pembrokeshire at 51°52′N 5°18′W
- Easternmost point – Lady Park Wood, near Monmouth, Monmouthshire at 51°49′N 2°39′W
- Easternmost settlement – Chepstow, Monmouthshire at 51°37′N 2°39′W

== Centre point ==
The centre point of Wales is dependent on whether only the mainland is used for calculation or outlying islands as well.

One centre point is calculated to be near Cwmystwyth, Devil's Bridge, Ceredigion (52°19′48.791″N 3°45′59.072″W; grid reference SN7972871704)

== Elevation extremes ==
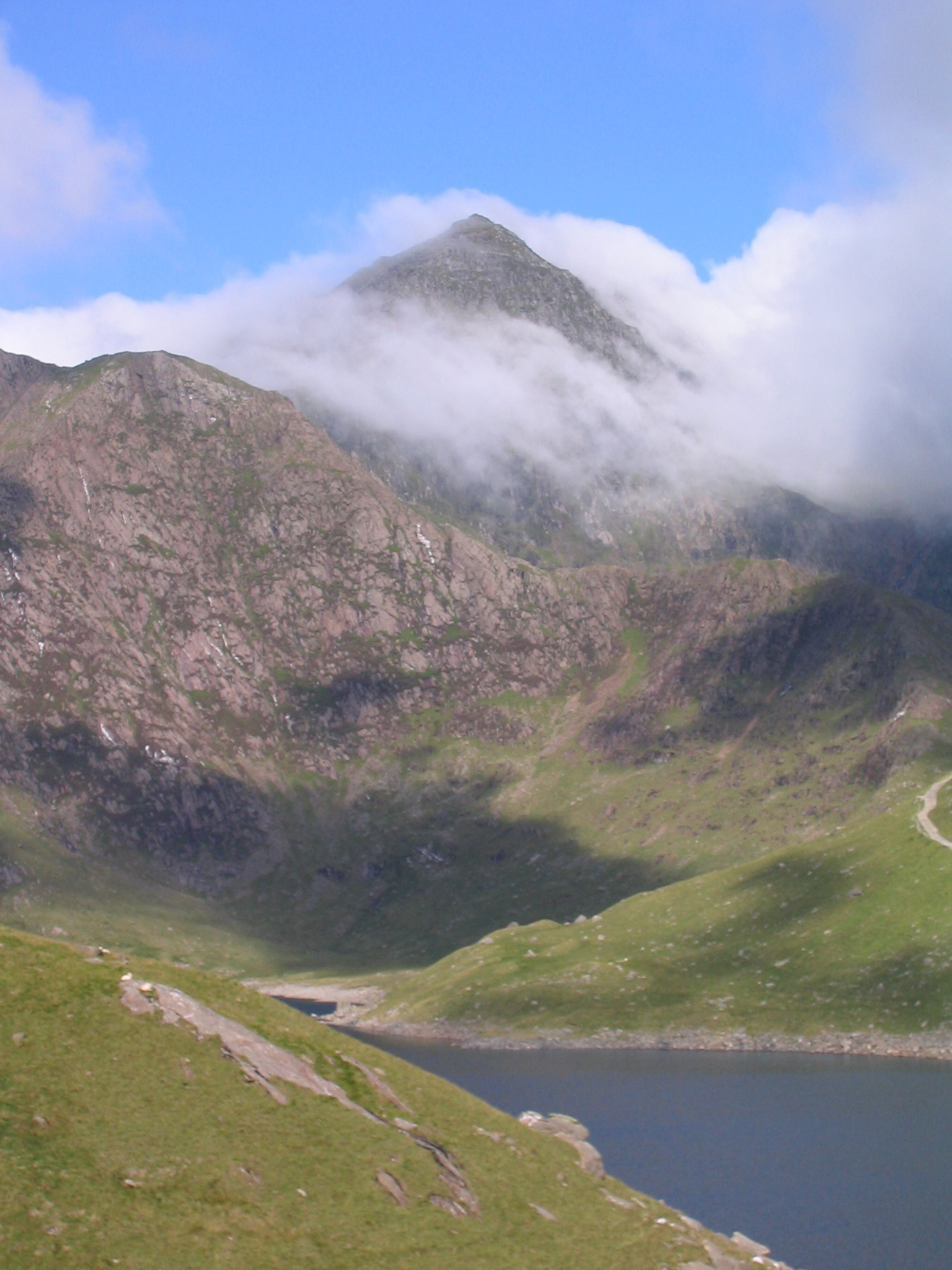
Snowdon seen from Llyn Llydaw

- Wales: Snowdon (Yr Wyddfa) in Snowdonia (Eryri) - 1,085 m (3,560 ft)

Many points are on, or near sea level, but due to high rainfall, there are no natural dry pieces of land below sea level - see rivers and lakes below.

== Rivers and lakes ==
The largest natural lake in Wales is Llyn Tegid (Bala Lake). Llangorse Lake is second largest by area.

The River Usk is the longest river to flow wholly within Wales. The table below lists Wales' longest rivers including (in italics) those only partly in Wales.

| | River | Total length | | Length in Wales | |
| | River | (miles) | (km) | (miles) | (km) |
|---|---|---|---|---|---|
| 1 | River Severn | 220 | 354 | 48 | 77 |
| 2 | River Wye | 155 | 250 | | |
| 3 | River Teme | 81 | 130 | 12 | 19 |
| 4 | River Usk | 78 | 125 | 78 | 125 |
| 5 | River Teifi | 76 | 122 | 76 | 122 |
| 6 | River Towy | 75 | 120 | 75 | 120 |
| 7 | River Dee | 70 | 112 | | |
| 8 | River Taff | 40 | 64 | 40 | 64 |

== See also ==
- Centre points of the United Kingdom
- Geography of Wales
- Extreme points of the British Isles
