= Economic history of Wales =

The development of the Welsh economy since the 18th century has largely been concentrated on the mining industry during the Industrial revolution in Wales, with the economy largely dependent on agriculture in centuries prior. The Welsh slate industry once was the world's largest, and Wales' significant coalfields led to the industry transforming many parts of Wales. Wales experienced de-industrialisation in the late 20th century, becoming more of a service economy to the present day.

== 18th century ==
Until the mid 18th century, economic development in Wales was restricted by its peripheral location, predominantly upland topography, bad communications and sparse population. Commerce was most advanced in the small coastal ports that had regular commerce with Bristol or Liverpool; the other major sources of external trading contact were the drovers, who drove cattle from Mid Wales along Drovers roads for sale and slaughter in the English Midlands and London's Smithfield Market from the 14th century onwards. The drovers were instrumental in establishing the first banks in Wales, such as Banc Y Ddafad Ddu ("Black Sheep Bank") in Aberystwyth.

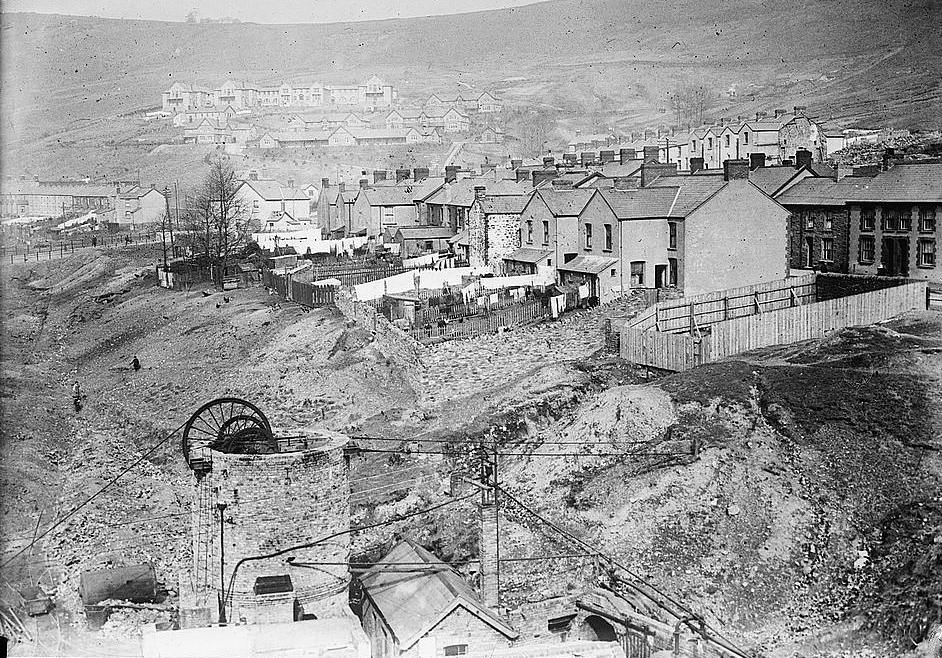
Llwynypia during the early to mid 1910s, Rhondda, Wales

Industrial development from the mid 18th century was stimulated by the potential of Wales' rich mineral deposits, the arrival of English entrepreneurs and financiers and advances in technology. The development of iron smelting by coke made the South Wales Valleys a natural industrial location during the Industrial Revolution and, from the mid 18th century, increased demand for metals and coal was generated first by war and later by the advent of steamships and railways.

The northern rim of the South Wales Coalfield, focused on Merthyr, became Britain's foremost iron-producing district in the second half of the 18th century, while the south-western part of the coalfield, around Swansea, emerged as an important centre of non-ferrous metal smelting and tinplate production. Metallurgical industries required ever increasing quantities of coal, which was initially largely mined for this purpose. However, coal mining for sale developed in earnest from the mid 19th century and this was to become the signature industry of the region, transforming the economic and social landscape of the South Wales Valleys.

== 19th century ==
Although a much smaller industry than coal, the slate industry in Wales became the world's largest supplier in the 19th century and had an enduring impact on the landscape of North Wales. At its height in the 1890s, there were dozens of quarries employing around 15,000 men, although they suffered from the boom and bust nature of the construction industry. As most of the workforce were drawn from rural, Welsh-speaking communities, slate quarrying was described by one historian as "the most Welsh of Welsh industries".

== 20th century ==
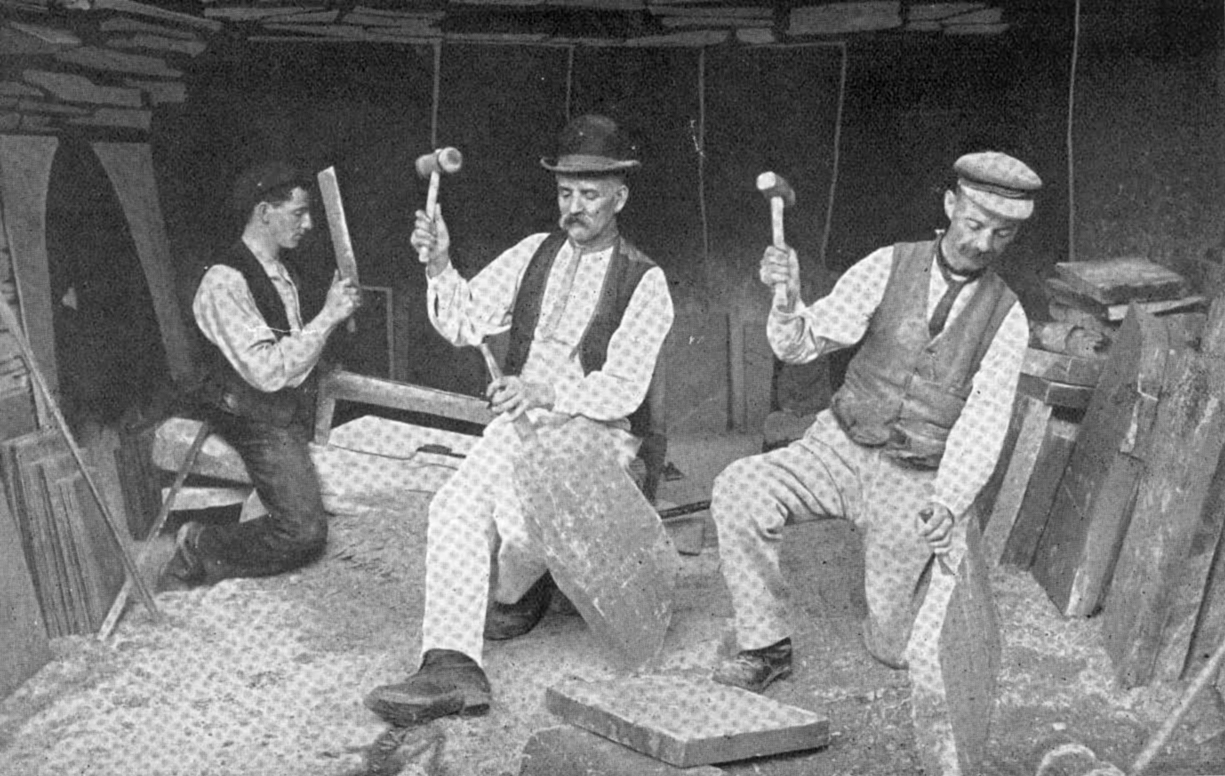
Quarrymen working at the Dinorwic Quarry in about 1910

Despite explosive growth in the early 1900s, by the 1920s it was apparent that Wales was facing economic difficulties, largely because of its reliance on older heavy industry rather the newer, growing light industry sectors that were becoming established in the more prosperous parts of England. Even during a boom period at the start of the 20th century, Wales had a narrow economic base dependent on the labour intensive exploitation of natural resources. The Welsh export economy collapsed during the inter-war recession, a victim of increasing protectionism and the rise of new competitors overseas. As global terms of trade changed, unemployment in the South Wales Valleys soared to unprecedented levels during the early 1930s (up to 59% in Merthyr and 76% in Pontypridd), despite the exodus of 400,000 people from the region between 1921 and 1939.

In the post-war era, the steel and tinplate industries consolidated on a smaller number of larger sites, such as the new works at Port Talbot and Llanwern. The National Coal Board, created in 1947, tried to modernise the Welsh coal industry but the number of pits in South Wales shrank from 115 in 1953, producing almost 21 million tons, to 34 in 1981, producing 7.7 million tons. Pembrokeshire and Swansea Bay became centres of the petrochemical industry and new light industry was attracted to locations throughout Wales. Wales attracted an above average share of the foreign direct investment (FDI) into the UK from the 1970s onwards but many of the new plants established by foreign firms were essentially "branch factory" operations offering low-wage, low-skill employment opportunities. In 1971 Sir Julian Hodge founded the Commercial Bank of Wales (later renamed Bank of Wales) but the company was later taken over by HBOS and the brand dropped in 2002.

In the post-war decades there was a shift towards service sector employment, which accounted for 60% of jobs by the 1980s, many of them held by women. The concentration of official agencies in Cardiff increased the amount of bureaucratic public sector employment: Government regional policy brought various national bodies to Wales: the Royal Mint moved to Llantrisant, Companies House to Cardiff and the Driver and Vehicle Licensing Centre to Swansea. From the 1970s on, the steel industry contracted, with works at Ebbw Vale, Shotton and East Moors in Cardiff closing and layoffs elsewhere. The early 1980s recession had a bigger impact in Wales than in other parts of the UK: between 1979 and 1982, Wales lost 130,000 jobs and the employment rate fell to 62%. Recovery started later in Wales, and structural changes left a legacy of high unemployment amongst older men, especially in the Valleys.

== 21st century ==
Video of Welsh Government COVID-19 press conference in which the Economy Minister Ken Skates announces that HMRC refused to share their data with the Welsh Government

Wales lags well behind the financial city of London, but according to the World Bank, in 2019 Wales' GDP /capita was better than 127 other nations. Over the long term, output and productivity growth in Wales has been broadly in line with the UK and the developed world as a whole. What has marked Wales out is a low activity rate compared to other parts of the UK.

== Indicators ==
Gross Value Added (GVA)
Year	£ million	£ per head	Index of £ per head (UK=100)
1989	19,445	6,810	85
1990	20,990	7,335	84
1991	21,724	7,561	83
1992	22,659	7,874	83
1993	23,697	8,218	83
1994	25,049	8,675	83
1995	26,388	9,135	84
1996	27,518	9,517	82
1997	28,672	9,904	80
1998	29,787	10,273	79
1999	30,736	10,596	77
2000	31,898	10,973	77
2001	33,525	11,520	77
2002	35,252	12,074	77
2003	37,262	12,712	76
2004	39,340	13,352	76
2005	40,711	13,784	76
2006	42,697	14,396	75
2007	44,263	14,853	74
2008	45,610	15,237	74
2018	65,089	20,815	70
