= List of Welsh inventions and discoveries =

This is a list of inventions and discoveries made in Wales or by Welsh people.

== Innovations in Wales or by Welsh people ==
=== 1557 – Equals = and plus + signs ===
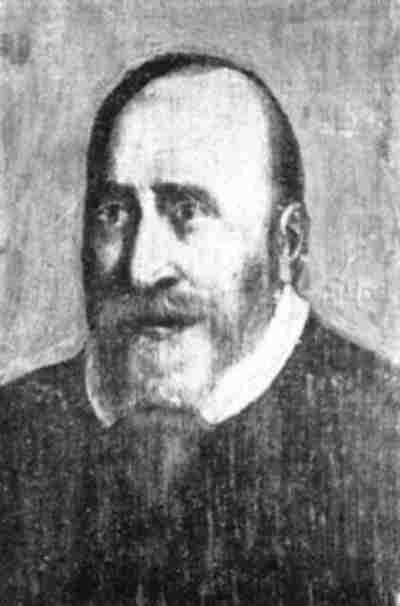
Robert Recorde

Robert Recorde (c. 1512 – 1558) was a Welsh physician and mathematician. He invented the equals sign (=) and also introduced the pre-existing plus sign (+) to English speakers in 1557.

=== 1706 – pi symbol ===
William Jones, FRS (1675 – 1 July 1749) was a Welsh mathematician, most noted for his use of the symbol π (the Greek letter Pi) to represent the ratio of the circumference of a circle to its diameter.

=== 1794 – Ball bearing ===
Philip Vaughan was a Welsh inventor and ironmaster who patented the first design for a ball bearing in 1794.

=== 1810 – Utopian socialism, cooperative and 8-hour day ===
Robert Owen (14 May 1771 – 17 November 1858) was a Welsh textile manufacturer, philanthropist and social reformer, and a founder of utopian socialism and the cooperative movement. He strove to improve factory working conditions, promoted experimental socialistic communities, and sought a more collective approach to child rearing, including government control of education. In the early 19th century, Robert Owen raised the demand for a ten-hour day in 1810, and instituted it in his "socialist" enterprise at New Lanark. By 1817 he had formulated the goal of the eight-hour day and coined the slogan: "Eight hours' labour, Eight hours' recreation, Eight hours' rest".

=== 1836 – Iron smelting ===
David Thomas was widely regarded as one of the foremost ironmasters in the United Kingdom. It was while employed at the Yniscedwyn Works, in Ystradgynlais in the Swansea Valley, that he devised the process which would advance the Industrial Revolution. On February 5, 1837, Thomas used a hot blast to smelt iron ore and anthracite coal.

=== 1842 – The hydrogen fuel cell ===
The first references to hydrogen fuel cells appeared in 1838. In a letter dated October 1838 but published in the December 1838 edition of The London and Edinburgh Philosophical Magazine and Journal of Science, Welsh physicist and barrister Sir William Grove wrote about the development of his first crude fuel cells. He used a combination of sheet iron, copper and porcelain plates, and a solution of sulphate of copper and dilute acid.

=== 1861 – Mail-order shopping ===
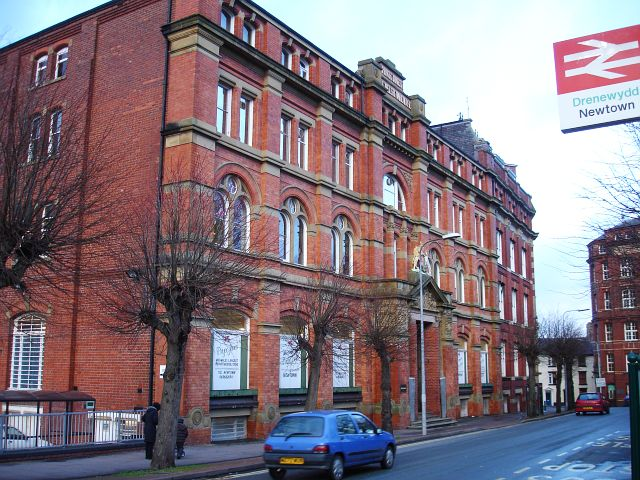
Warehouse used by Pryce-Jones, Newtown

Sir Pryce Pryce-Jones (16 October 1834 – 11 January 1920) was a Welsh entrepreneur who formed the first mail order business, revolutionising how products were sold. Creating the first mail-order catalogues in 1861 – which consisted of woollen goods – for the first time customers could order by post, and the goods were delivered by railway. The BBC summed up his legacy as "The mail-order pioneer who started a billion-pound industry".

Pryce-Jones became hugely successful in the United Kingdom where he had over 100,000 customers, which included Florence Nightingale and Queen Victoria. In England, he was able to promise next-day delivery. His business also took off overseas, selling Welsh flannel to the rest of Europe, the United States followed by Australia. During the 1870s he took part in exhibitions all over the world, winning several awards, and he became world-famous. The Queen knighted him in 1887.

=== Orthopaedic advancements inc. the Thomas splint and Thomas test ===
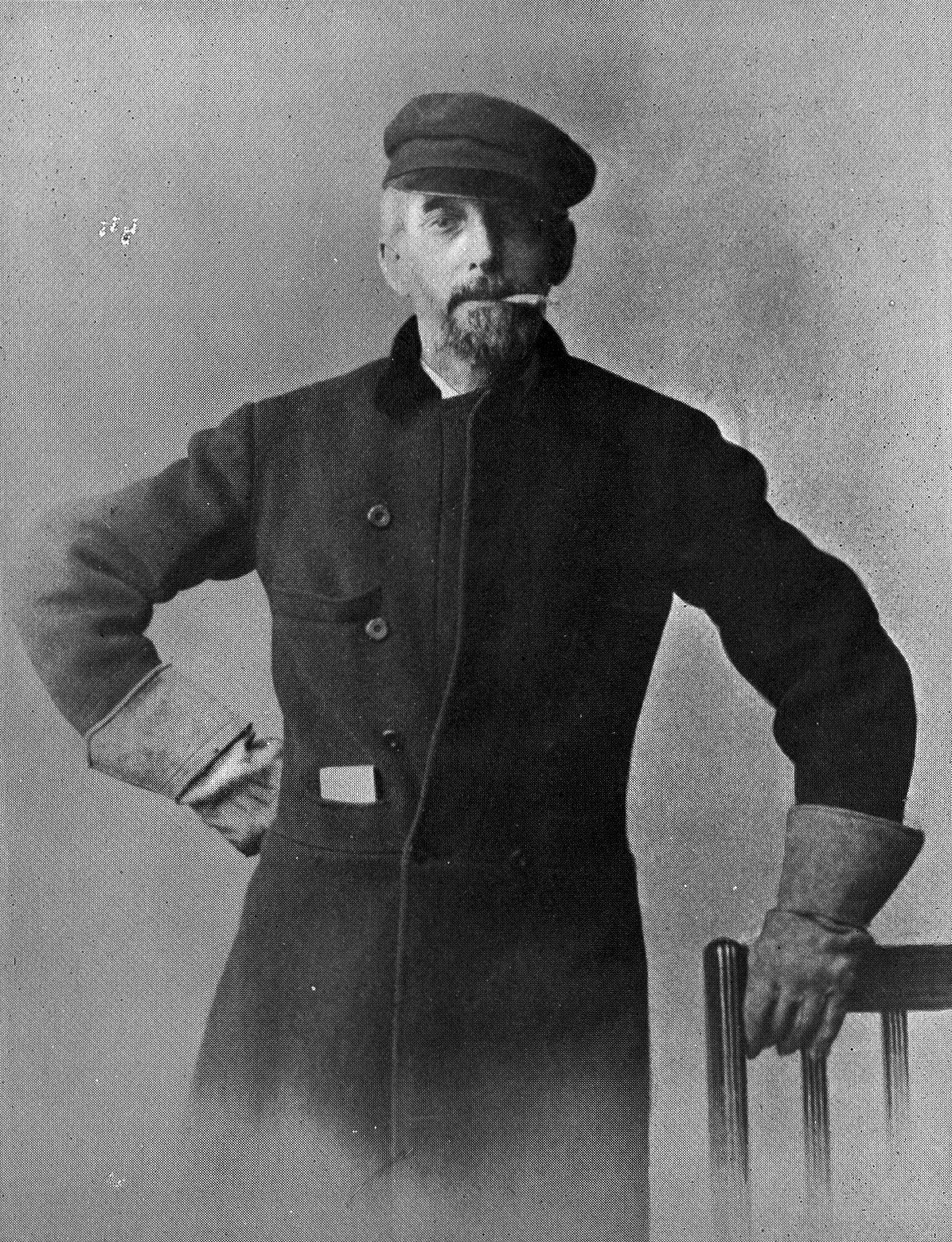
Hugh Owen Thomas, known as the father of orthopaedic surgery

Hugh Owen Thomas was descended from a line of Welsh bone setters and placed great importance on rest in treatment of fractures. He is responsible for a number of contributions to orthopaedic treatment and surgery, producing a number of books and methods that revolutionised orthopaedic practice. He is particularly known for the Thomas splint, which was widely used during World War I, reducing mortality from 80% to just 8% by the end of the war. The Thomas test, is a method of detecting hip flexion contracture (fixed partial flexion of the hip) and to measure hip extensibility by having a patient lie flat on a firm bed/table while holding one knee to their chest. The opposite thigh is then observed for hip contracture and extensibility.

=== 1878 – The microphone ===
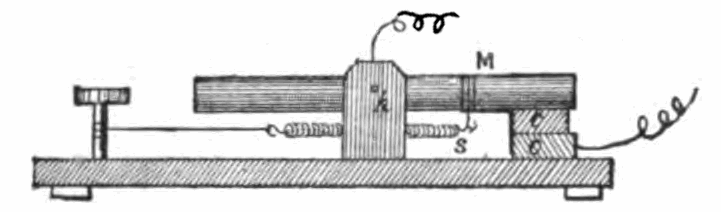
Adjustable carbon rod microphone invented by David Edwards Hughes

David Edward Hughes (16 May 1831– 22 January 1900), was a Welsh inventor, practical experimenter, and professor of music known for his work on the printing telegraph and the microphone. His family moved around the time of his birth so he may have been born in London or Corwen.

=== 1880 – Women in medicine, social reform ===
Frances Elizabeth Hoggan (née Morgan; 20 December 1843 – 5 February 1927) was a Welsh doctor and the first British woman to receive a doctorate in medicine from any university in Europe. She was also a pioneering medical practitioner, researcher and social reformer and the first female doctor to be registered in Wales. She and her husband opened the first husband-and-wife medical practice in Britain.

Following her graduation, Frances did post-graduate work at top medical schools in Vienna, Prague and Paris before returning to Britain. She spent several years as a medical practitioner working with Elizabeth Garrett Anderson at the New Hospital for Women in London. She also helped to found the National Health Society with Elizabeth Blackwell in 1871. Its purpose was to "promote health amongst all classes of the population."

=== 1884 – Legalising cremation ===
Doctor William Price (1800–1893) cremated his son on a Llantrisant hilltop following his death, which was considered blasphemous at the time. While in court, Price noted that while cremation was not legal in the UK, it was also not illegal. This led to the Cremation Act 1902. Today, a statue still stands of Price in the town of Llantrisant.

=== 1886 – Deep space photography ===
Isaac Roberts FRS (27 January 1829 – 17 July 1904) was a Welsh engineer and businessman best known for his work as an amateur astronomer, pioneering the field of astrophotography of nebulae. On 29 December 1888, he took what is believed to be the first photograph of the Andromeda Galaxy, although he believed the object to be a nebula. He was a member of the Liverpool Astronomical Society in England and was a fellow of the Royal Geological Society. Roberts was also awarded the Gold Medal of the Royal Astronomical Society in 1895.

=== 1896 – Early flying machine ===
William (Bill) Frost (1848–1935) was the first person to fly a powered airplane. He was a Welsh designer of an early flying machine, the Frost Airship Glider. Frost's ambition to invent the flying machine started in ~1880. Despite his poverty, he managed to construct the "Frost Airship Glider", which seems, in principle, to have resembled a vertical takeoff aeroplane, with gas-filled tanks.

=== 1896 – Public Health and US senator ===
Dr Martha Hughes Cannon (1857–1932) was born in Llandudno and then emigrated to the United States. She worked as a medical doctor, suffragist as well as a public health reformer. In 1896 she became the first female US state senator and introduced legislative bills that revolutionised public health in Utah, where the present Department of Health building, in Salt Lake City, is named in her honour.

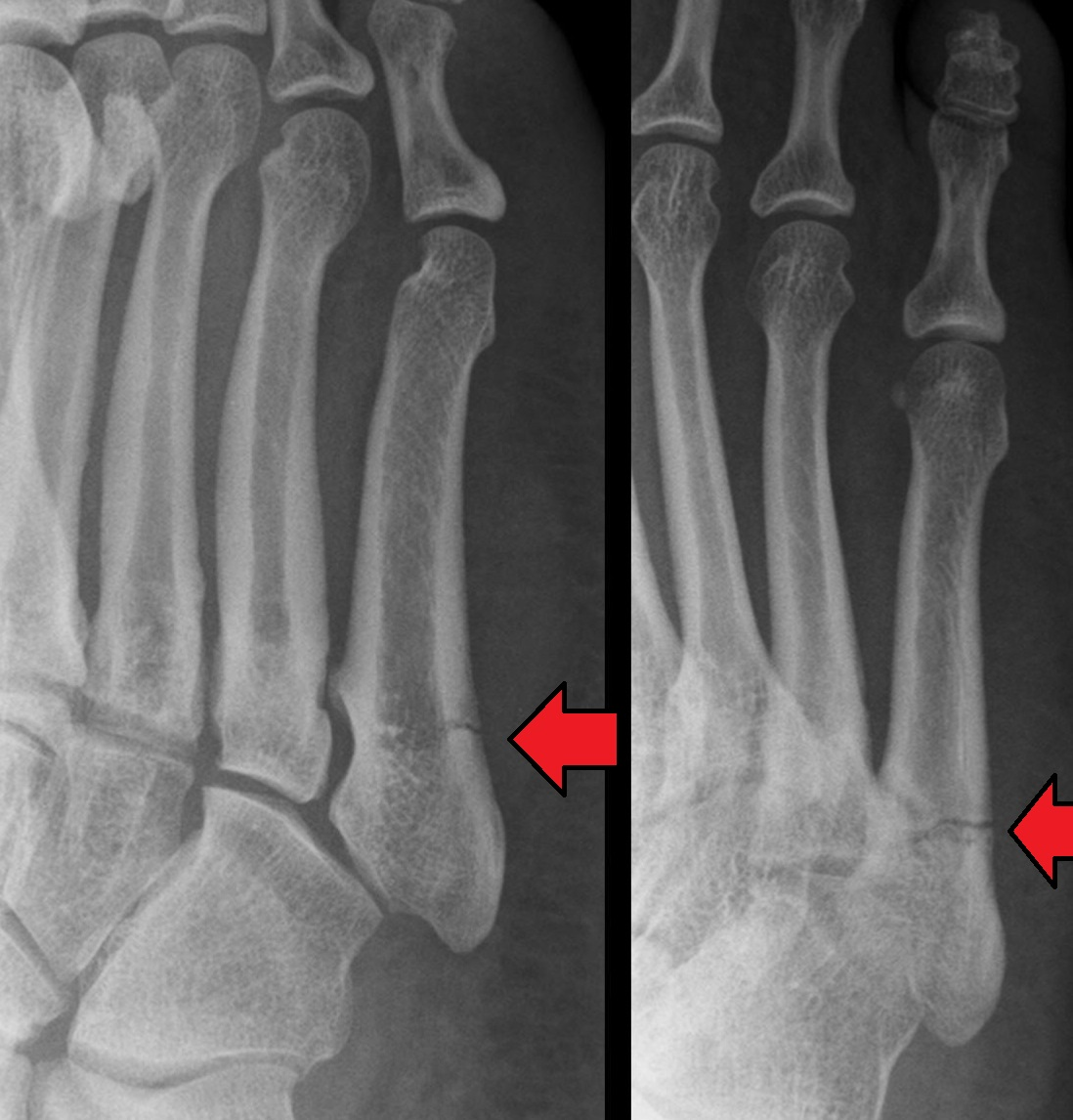
Example of Robert Jones' Jones fracture

=== 1896 and 1902 – Jones fracture and published radiograph ===
On 7 February 1896, Welsh orthopaedic surgeon Robert Jones (and Oliver Lodge) took a radiograph of the wrist of a 12-year-old boy to locate a bullet that could not be found by probing. The X-ray required a 2-hour exposure, but successfully demonstrated the bullet lodged in the third carpometacarpal joint. This case was published in The Lancet in February 1896, the first published clinical radiograph.

Robert Jones described the fracture of the fifth metatarsal which bears his name in the Annals of Surgery in 1902. In his paper, Jones described the fracture in a series of six patients, the first of which was himself.

=== 1904 – Spare wheel ===
The early days of motor travel took place on primitive roads that were littered with stray horseshoe nails. Punctures (flat tyres) were all too common and required the motorist to remove the wheel from the car, demount the tyre, patch the inner tube, re-mount the tyre, inflate the tyre and re-mount the wheel. To alleviate this time-consuming process, Walter Davies and Tom Davies of Llanelli, Wales, invented the spare wheel in 1904. At the time, motor cars were made without spare wheels.

=== 1934 – Ophthalmic surgery ===
Tudor Thomas (23 May 1893 – 23 January 1976) was a Welsh ophthalmic surgeon who came to note in 1934 when pioneering work on corneal grafting restored the sight of a man who had been nearly blind for 27 years. He was also a clinical teacher for the Welsh National School of Medicine. It was while at the School of Medicine that he undertook his pioneering work in corneal grafting. He conceived the idea of a donor system for corneal grafts and an eye bank was established in East Grinstead in 1955.

=== 1935 – Radar ===
Edward George "Taffy" Bowen, CBE, FRS (14 January 1911 – 12 August 1991) was a Welsh physicist who made a major contribution to the development of radar. He was also an early radio astronomer, playing a key role in the establishment of radio astronomy in Australia and the United States.

=== 1936–1939 – "The father of modern meteorology" (Weather science) ===
David Brunt (1886–1965) is known for changing weather forecasting into a science. Between 1936 and 1939 contributed to the theoretical understanding of fog dispersal and this information was used in the development of the FIDO fog dispersal system.

=== 1939 – Muon decay ===
Evan James Williams, physicist, was the first person to experimentally detect muon decay and photograph it.

=== 1948 – National Health Service (NHS) ===
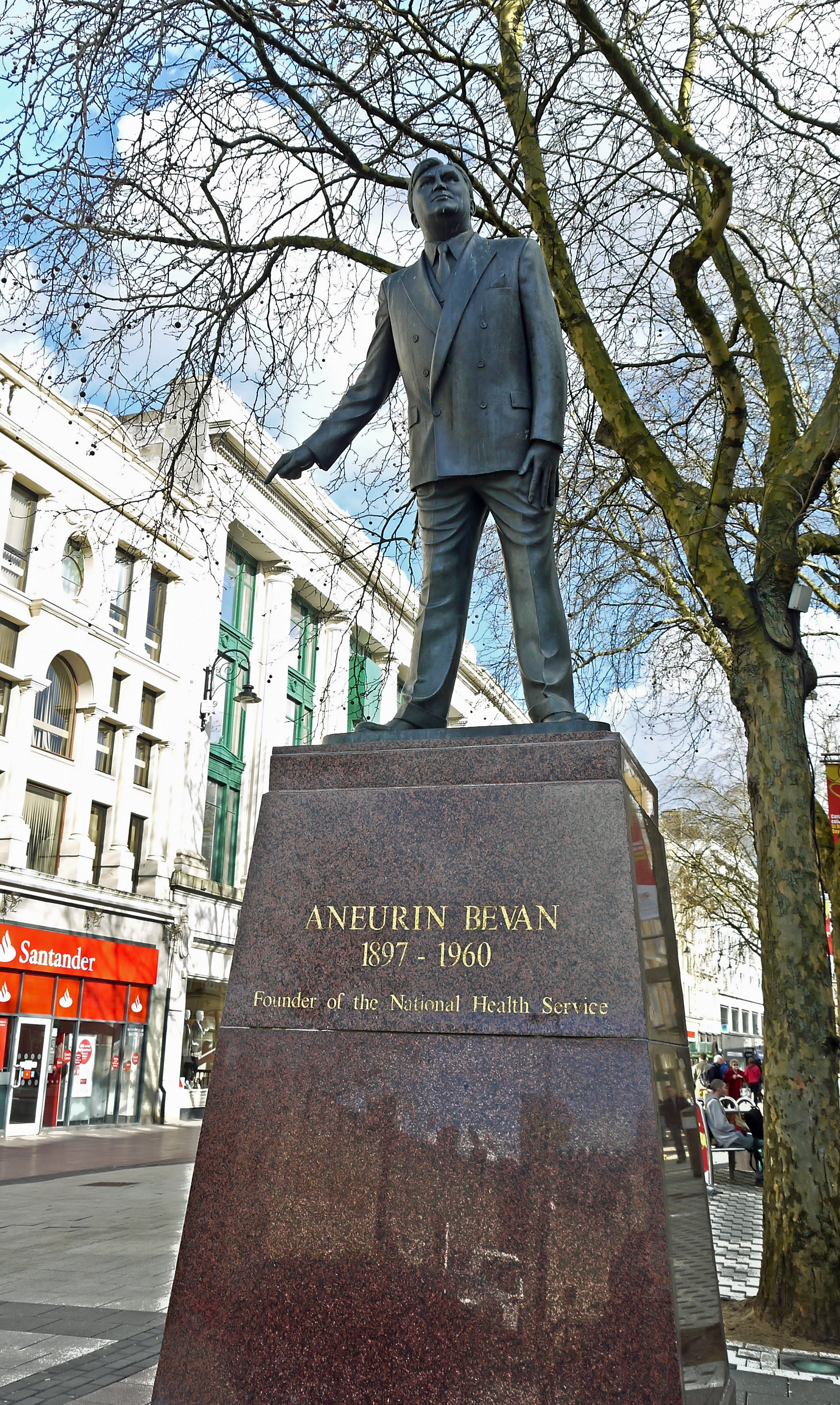
Statue of Bevan in Cardiff

Welshman Aneurin Bevan, founded the National Health Service in 1948 while serving as minister for health. Bevan was inspired by a system used by local miners and steel workers who paid weekly subscriptions to be covered for medical and hospital expenses, saying in 1947: "All I am doing is extending to the entire population of Britain the benefits we had in Tredegar for a generation or more. We are going to Tredegar-ise you."

=== 1963 – Rigid inflatable boat (RIB) ===
The RIB is a lightweight but high-performance and high-capacity boat constructed with a rigid hull bottom joined to side-forming air tubes that are inflated with air to a high pressure so as to give the sides resilient rigidity along the boat's topsides.

Development of the RIB was originally undertaken by students and staff at Atlantic College in South Wales, under the direction of retired Navy Admiral Desmond Hoare, who headed the school. A series of experimental and prototype solutions for effectively combining a hard hull form with an inflated fabric sponson lasted for over a decade. The RIB craft developed at Atlantic College in Llantwit Major, Wales and served as an effective seafront activities safety and rescue boat for the college's fleet of sailing dinghies on the often challenging Bristol Channel, and the college went on to become an Inshore Lifeboat Station for the RNLI in 1963.

=== 1965 – Packet switching ===
In 1965 Donald Davies conceived of packet switching, which is today the dominant basis for data communications in computer networks worldwide. Davies proposed a commercial national network in the United Kingdom and designed and built the local-area NPL network to demonstrate the technology. Many of the wide-area packet-switched networks built in the 1970s were similar "in nearly all respects" to his original 1965 design. The ARPANET project credited Davies for his influence, which was key to the development of the Internet.

Donald Davies is credited with coining the modern term packet switching and inspiring numerous packet switching networks in the decade following, including the incorporation of the concept into the design of the ARPANET in the United States.

=== 1971 - Health & Inverse Care Law ===
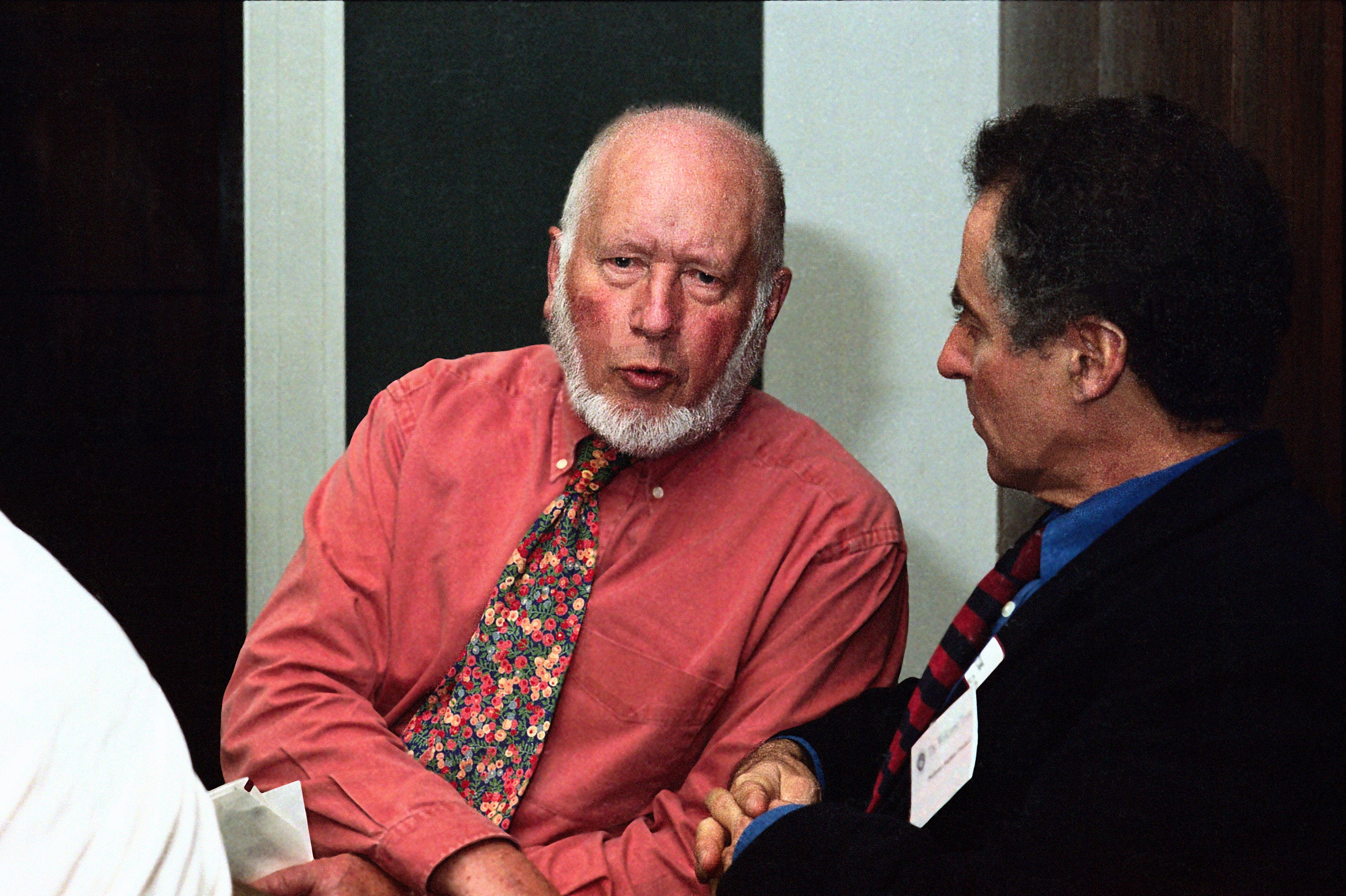
General practitioner, Julian Tudor-Hart

General practitioner doctor in Glyncorrwg, Julian Tudor-Hart submitted a paper to the Lancet medical journal in 1971 stating, "The availability of good medical care tends to vary inversely with the need for it in the population served. This inverse care law operates more completely where medical care is most exposed to market forces, and less so where such exposure is reduced." This "Inverse Care Law" is still cited by doctors, politicians and researchers today. The medical practice at Glyncorrwg became the first in the UK to be recognised as a research practice.

=== 1973 – Josephson effect ===
Welsh physicist, Brian Josephson was awarded the Nobel Prize in Physics in 1973 for his prediction of the Josephson effect, made in 1962 when he was a 22-year-old PhD student at Cambridge University. Josephson is the only Welshman to have won a Nobel Prize in Physics. He shared the prize with physicists Leo Esaki and Ivar Giaever, who jointly received half the award for their own work on quantum tunnelling.

=== 1976 – Electronic breathalyser ===
1967 in Cardiff, Bill Ducie and Tom Parry Jones developed and marketed the first electronic breathalyser. They established Lion Laboratories in Cardiff. Ducie was a chartered electrical engineer, and Tom Parry Jones was a lecturer at UWIST. The Road Safety Act 1967 introduced the first legally enforceable maximum blood alcohol level for drivers in the UK, above which it became an offence to be in charge of a motor vehicle; and introduced the roadside breathalyser, made available to police forces across the country.

=== 2014 – Oldest jurassic dinosaur fossil ===
A Dracoraptor fossil was first discovered in 2014 by Rob and Nick Hanigan and Sam Davies at the Blue Lias Formation on the South Wales coast. The genus name Dracoraptor is from Draco referring to the Welsh Dragon and raptor, meaning robber, a commonly employed suffix for theropod dinosaurs with the type species being Dracoraptor hanigani. It is the oldest known Jurassic dinosaur and is the first dinosaur skeleton from the Jurassic of Wales.

=== 2020 – Covid Emergency Ventilator ===
The Covid Emergency Ventilator device was designed by senior consultant at Glangwili Hospital including Dr Rhys Thomas, after being prompted by Plaid Cymru leader Adam Price. The device was first produced by an engineering company in Ammanford with Dr Thomas saying that the device would not replace ICU ventilators and would be used before patients required intensive care treatment, which could mean patient with COVID-19 not needing ICU admission. The device underwent clinical trial in Bangladesh due to less patients being in Wales.

=== 2021 – Easier use medical compression stocking ===
Dr Robert Lister, a dermatologist at Wrexham Maelor Hospital, noted a trend among patients failing to wear the compression devices for management of vascular conditions and chronic oedema and devised a two part slip on stocking that could make application and removal easier. The stocking was awarded an NHS contract for 400 units.

== See also ==
- List of Welsh medical pioneers
- Science and technology in Wales
