= List of Welsh architects =

This page lists Welsh architects. People have also been included who were born outside Wales but who are primarily known for their practice within Wales.

== 18th century ==
- Lloyd Hesketh Bamford-Hesketh (1788–1861), attributed with the design of Gwrych Castle.
- William Edwards (1719–1789), stonemason, architect and bridge designer.
- George Maddox (1760–1843), born in Monmouth.
- John Nash (1752–1835), family connection to Wales, lived and worked in Wales from 1784.

== 19th century ==
- Benjamin Gummow (1766–1840)
- Lloyd Williams and Underwood, a firm of architects based in Denbigh
- George Vaughan Maddox (1802–1864)
- Jacob Owen (1778–1870)
- Richard Owens (1831–1891)
- Richard Kyrke Penson (1815–1885)
- Thomas Penson (c. 1790–1859)
- John Prichard (1817–1886)
- Edwin Seward (1853–1924)
- William Henry Skinner (1838–1915)
- John Jones (1810–1869) later known by his bardic name, Talhaiarn
- Thomas Thomas (1817–1888)
- E. M. Bruce Vaughan (1856–1919)
- Edward Welch (1806–1868)
- George Wightwick (1802–1872)
- Stephen W. Williams (1837–1899)

== 20th century ==
- Jonathan Adams
- Ianto Evans
- Sidney Colwyn Foulkes (1884-1971)
- Alex Gordon (1917-1999)
- George Francis Grimwood (1874–1938), Cardiff and Monmouth architect.
- Harold Hughes (1864-1940)
- Thomas Alwyn Lloyd (1881-1960)
- Ernest Morgan (1881-1954)
- Dale Owen (1924-1997)
- Malcolm Parry
- Gwynne Pugh, born in Cardiff, though largely active in California, USA
- Beddoe Rees (1877-1931)
- Giuseppe Rinvolucri (1894-1963)
- David Wyn Roberts (1911-1982)
- Edwin Seward (1853-1924)
- Alwyn Sheppard Fidler (1909-1990)
- Dewi-Prys Thomas (1916-1985)
- Percy Thomas (1883-1969)
- E. M. Bruce Vaughan (1856-1919)
- James Grey West (1885-1951)
- Clough Williams-Ellis (1883-1978)
- Reginald Wynn Owen (1876-1950)

== 21st century ==
- Jonathan Adams (b. 1961)
- Ianto Evans
- Malcolm Parry (b. c. 1938)

== See also ==
- Architecture of Wales
