= Industrial Revolution in Wales =

Aspect of Welsh industrial history

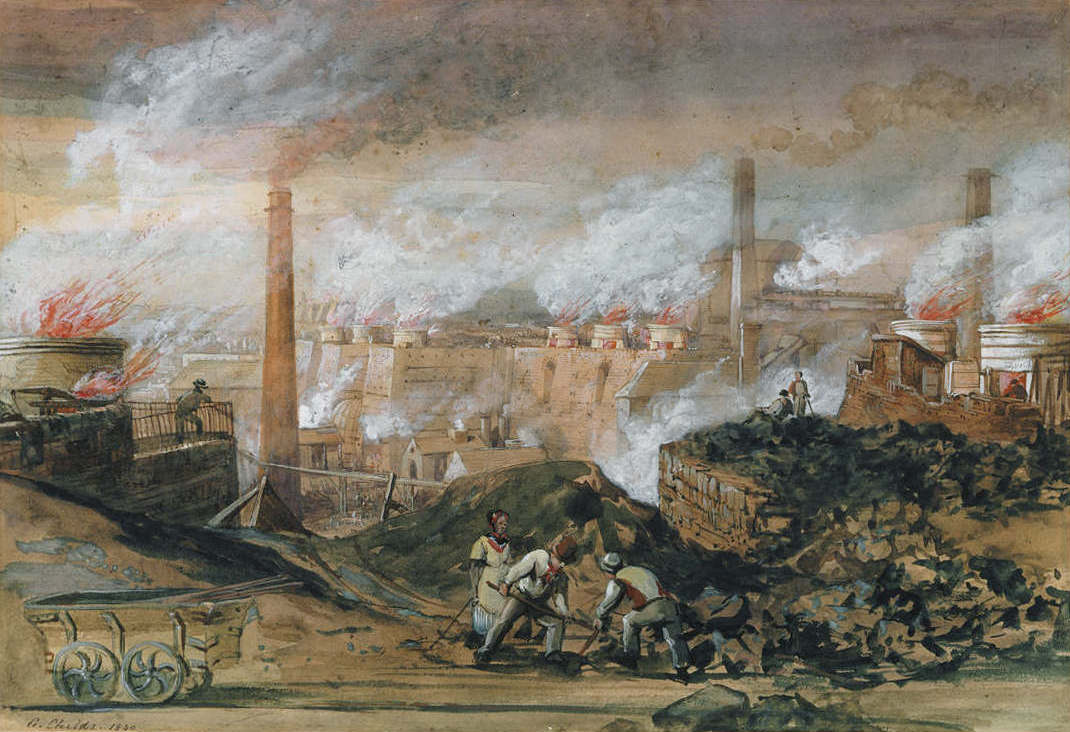
Dowlais Ironworks by George Childs (1840)

The Industrial Revolution in Wales was the adoption and developments of new technologies in Wales in the 18th and 19th centuries as part of the Industrial Revolution, resulting in increases in the scale of industry in Wales.

== North-East Wales ==
Flintshire in North-East Wales developed the largest variety of industry in Wales. By the end of the 18th century there were 19 working metalworks at Holywell and 14 pottery works in Buckley. There were cotton mills in Holywell and Mold and there was a growth in the lead and coal industry.

The Wrexham area in the 19th century was highly industrialised. At the peak there were 38 different collieries operating in the area, each producing coal totalling over 2.5 million tonnes annually to the numerous brickworks and steelworks in the area, including Brymbo Steel Works and Shotton Steel Works. In Bersham, near Wrexham there was the Bersham Colliery and Bersham Ironworks. Coke was pioneered for smelting iron rather than charcoal, and the site was a leading ironworks in Europe.

Greenfield, also in Flintshire, is best known for its history of papermaking. A paper mill has been on this site since 1770. The site was chosen due to the constant water flow from the stream which comes from the St Winefride's Well. The speed this site developed was one of the reasons that Greenfield is still linked with the start of the Industrial Revolution. In the mid-19th century, up to 80 businesses had set up in the mile stretch between Holywell and Greenfield. The remains of some can now be seen as conservation and industrial archeological projects have been undertaken in recent years. Among the businesses were a copper mill, a flannel mill, a flour mill, shirt-makers and soft drink works, W Hall & Son (which still exists today). Greenfield was also home to two Courtaulds rayon factories and a sulphuric acid plant from 1936 to 1985.

== Dolgellau gold ==
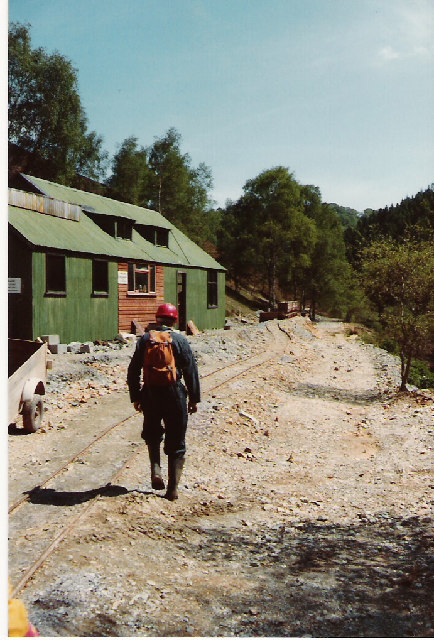
Gwynfynydd Gold Mine

Gold was found in the Dolgellau area in the 1850s and a mining rush developed. The first gold was discovered at Gwynfynydd in 1863, but it was not until 1887 that the mine was developed commercially. By this time the mine had been acquired by William Pritchard Morgan, who was to become known as the "Welsh gold king", and who paid for two police constables to protect the mine. By 1888, two hundred people were employed at the site, the gold being extracted by driving horizontal tunnels (adits) into the mountainside, with the miners working deep underground by candlelight. The machinery was powered by water wheels and water turbines. In contrast to other mines in the area where the gold was found in shallow deposits, the Gwynfynydd gold is extracted from large quartz veins deep underground.

The Clogau Gold Mine was opened to exploit the copper and lead veins in the area north of Bontddu. In 1854, gold was discovered at the mine in a vein of quartz. The main gold-bearing vein was named the "St. David's lode", and in 1860 arrangements were made with the Crown Estate to work the gold commercially. Operations started on 28 August 1860. Clogau produced significant amounts of gold in the 1890s. In 1899, it produced £60,000 worth of gold (equivalent to £6,666,022 in 2025). In 1919, exploration of the mine found new gold veins. A new crushing plant was installed and the mine was re-opened. In 1989 the Clogau Gold Mine was re-opened by William Roberts, founder of Clogau Gold of Wales Ltd. Gold extraction re-commenced between 1992 and 1998, with small-scale mining providing the gold for Clogau Gold jewellery. Mining eventually ceased in 1998 due to high cost of mining and diminishing quantities of gold being found.

== South Wales Valleys ==
In the early 19th century parts of Wales became heavily industrialised. Ironworks were set up in the South Wales Valleys, running south from the Brecon Beacons particularly around the new town of Merthyr Tydfil, with iron production later spreading westwards to the hinterlands of Neath and Swansea where anthracite coal was already being mined. From the 1840s coal mining spread to the Cynon and Rhondda valleys. This led to a rapid increase in the population of these areas.

=== Glamorgan ===
==== Metal industry ====
From the mid-18th century onwards, Glamorgan's uplands underwent large-scale industrialisation and several coastal towns, in particular Swansea and later Cardiff, became significant ports. From the late 18th century until the early 20th century Glamorgan produced 70 per cent of the British output of copper. The industry was developed by English entrepreneurs and investors such as John Henry Vivian and largely based in the west of the county, where coal could be purchased cheaply and ores imported from Cornwall, Devon and later much further afield. The industry was of immense importance to Swansea in particular; in 1823 the smelting works on the River Tawe, and the collieries and shipping dependent on them, supported between 8,000 and 10,000 people. Imports of copper ores reached a peak in the 1880s, after which there was a steep fall until the virtual end of the trade in the 1920s. The cost of shipping ores from distant countries, and the growth of foreign competitors, ended Glamorgan's dominance of the industry. Some of the works converted to the production of zinc and the Tawe valley also became a location for the manufacture of nickel after Ludwig Mond established a works at Clydach in 1902.

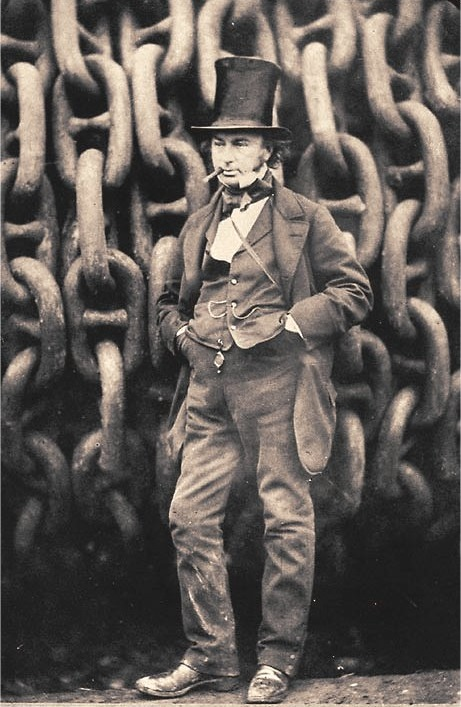
Isambard Brunel standing in front of the Great Eastern whose chains were made by Brown Lenox of Pontypridd

Even at its peak, copper smelting was never as significant as iron smelting, which was the major industrial employer of men and capital in south Wales before the rise of the sale-coal industry. Ironmaking developed in locations where ironstone, coal and limestone were found in close proximity – primarily the northern and south-western parts of the South Wales coalfield. In the second half of the 18th century four ironworks were built in Merthyr Tydfil. In 1759 the Dowlais Ironworks were established by a partnership of nine men. This was followed by the Plymouth Ironworks in 1763, which was formed by Isaac Wilkinson and John Guest, then in 1765 Anthony Bacon established the Cyfarthfa Ironworks. The fourth of the great ironworks, Penydarren Ironworks, was built in 1784. These works made Merthyr Tydfil the main centre of the industry in Wales.

As well as copper and iron, South Wales became an important centre for the tinplate industry with a concentrated number of works emerging around Swansea, Aberavon and Neath towards the late 19th century. Together with the famous Llanelli and Pontypool works, these sites saw the tinplate industry in Wales account for 80% of worldwide production. Glamorgan became the most populous and industrialised county in Wales and was known as the 'crucible of the Industrial Revolution'.

Other areas to house heavy industries include ironworks in Maesteg (1826), tinplate works in Llwydarth and Pontyclun and an iron ore mine in Llanharry. Alongside the metalworks, industries appeared throughout Glamorgan that made use of the works' output. Pontypridd was well known for the Brown Lenox Chainworks, which during the 19th century was the town's main industrial employer.

===== Coal industry =====
The largest change to industrial Glamorgan was the opening up of the South Wales coalfield, the largest continuous coalfield in Britain, which occupied the greater part of Glamorgan, mostly north of the Vale. The coalfield provided a vast range in quality and type, but prior to 1750 the only real access to the seams was through bell pits or digging horizontally into a level where the seam was exposed at a river bank or mountainside. Although initially excavated for export, coal was soon also needed for the smelting process in Britain's expanding metallurgical industries. Developments in coal mining began in the north-eastern rim of Glamorgan around the ironworks of Merthyr and in the south-west around the copper plants of Swansea. In 1828 the South Wales coalfield was producing an estimated 3 million tons of coal, by 1840 that had risen to 4.5 million, with about 70 percent consumed by local commercial and domestic usage.

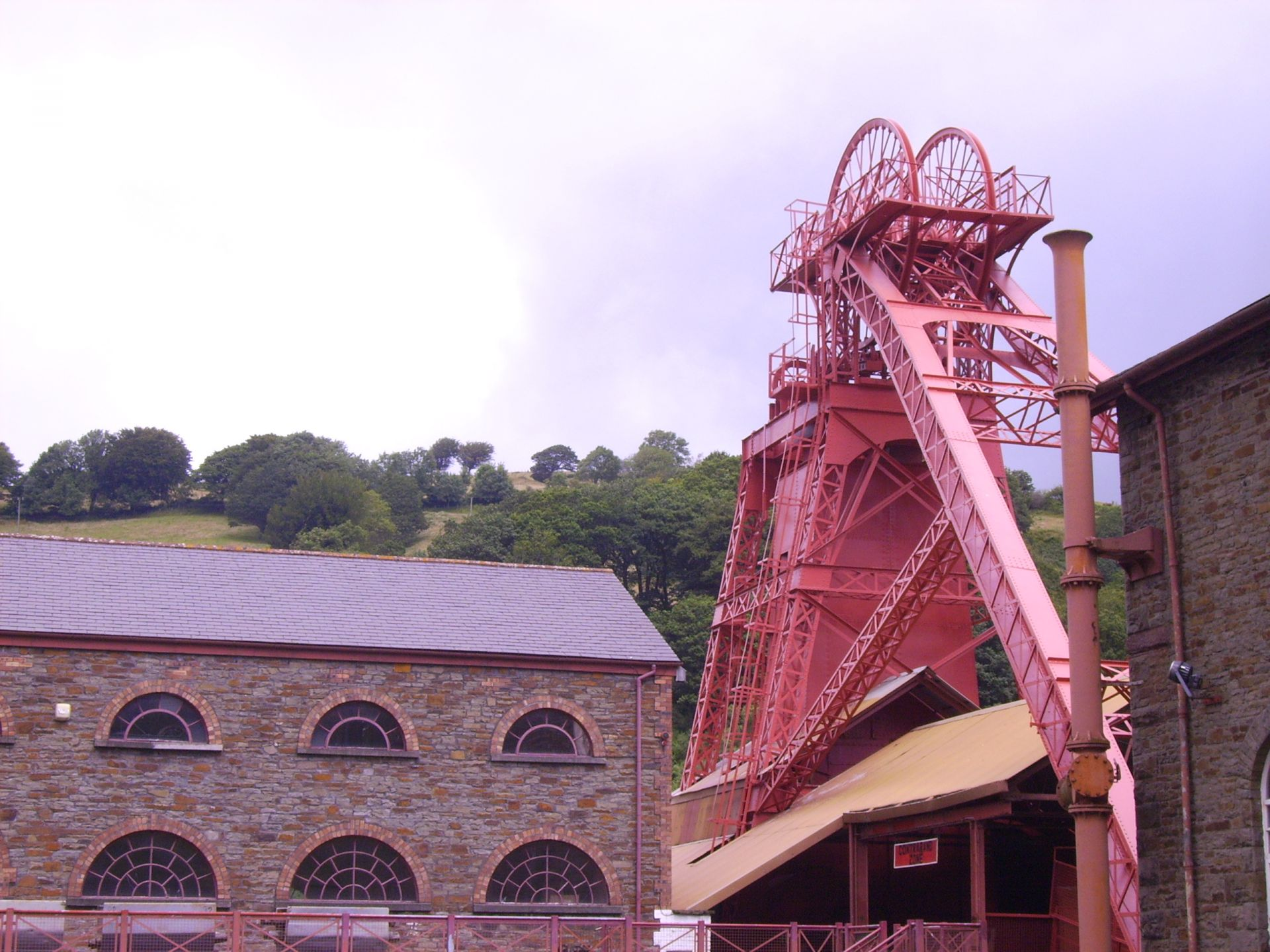
Lewis Merthyr Colliery, Rhondda, has been redeveloped for opening to the public as the Rhondda Heritage Park.

The 1840s saw the start of a dramatic increase in the amount of coal excavated within Glamorgan. Several events took place to precipitate the growth in coal mining, including the discovery of steam coal in the Cynon Valley, the building of a large masonry dock at Cardiff and the construction of the Taff Vale Railway. In 1845, after trials by the British Admiralty, Welsh steam coal replaced coal from Newcastle-upon-Tyne as the preferred fuel for the ships of the Royal Navy. Glamorgan steam coal quickly became a sought-after commodity for navies all over the world and its production increased to meet the demand.

The richest source for steam coal was the Rhondda Valleys, and by 1856 the Taff Vale Railway had reached the heads of both valleys. Over the next fifty years the Rhondda would grow to become the largest producer of coal of the age. In 1874, the Rhondda produced 2.13 million tons of coal, which rose to 5.8 million tons by 1884. The coal now produced in Glamorgan far exceeded the interior demand, and in the later half of the 19th century the area became a mass exporter for its product. In the 1890s the docks of South Wales accounted for 38 percent of British coal exports and a quarter of global trade.

Along with the increase in coal production came a very large increase in the population, as people emigrated to the area to seek employment. In Aberdare the population grew from 6,471 in 1841 to 32,299 in 1851 while the Rhondda grew from 3,035 in 1861 to 55,632 in 1881, peaking in 1921 at 162,729. Much of this population growth was driven by immigration. In the ten years from 1881 to 1891, net migration to Glamorgan was over 76,000, 63 percent of which was from the non-border counties of England – a proportion that increased in the following decade.

=== Lower Swansea Valley ===
==== Coal and metals ====
Over a period of about 150 years up until the 1920s, the open valley of the River Tawe became one of the most heavily industrialised areas of the developed world. There were a number of reasons that favoured the great expansion of industry in this particular location. The general exploitation of coal in the South Wales coalfield of the South Wales valleys had revealed seams of steam coal and anthracite close to the surface in the Upper Swansea valley and these were easily exploited by shallow drift mining or open cast mining. Smelting metals required more than three parts of coal to every one part of metal ore, so it was of major economic benefit to have easily available, high quality coal. Swansea also had a good port and safe anchorage. The combination of these two factors meant that it was financially more viable to bring the ore to Swansea's coal than take the coal to the ore. In addition, the very high tidal ranges at Swansea allowed deep draught ships to access the river mouth. This allowed large quantities of raw materials to be brought in (allowing further profit through economies of scale) and, more importantly, the finished products, such as sheet copper, tinplate, alum, porcelain and coal to be exported.

The technologies involved in iron making had already been developed and refined, and skilled craftsmen were readily available to extend the newly developing industry. Swansea was already a town of significant size which could provide the required workforce. The growth of the industry in the Lower Swansea valley itself caused a great expansion in the population of Swansea and nearby Neath. A number of wealthy entrepreneurs, scientists and engineers of considerable ability were drawn to Swansea during this period, which in turn, promoted great innovation in the industrial processes.

Initially the smelting works concentrated on copper. Coal was brought down to them by waggonways and tramways; copper ore was brought on ships which could sail right up to the works; and the resulting copper was exported out again the same way. Swansea became known as Copperopolis; and the lower Tawe valley became a mass of industry. In the wake of the copper and coal industry followed pottery-making (another industry which requires large amounts of coal, together with clay and flint, which could be shipped in from the West Country); the alum industry (based on pyrites found with coal); and the manufacture of fire-clay, which was used to line furnaces.

==== Copper ====
The first copper smelter directly associated was established at Landore in 1717 by John Lane and John Pollard. Pollard later went on to build the Llangyfelach copper works. In 1720 the Cambrian Works was set up near the mouth of the river and continued in production until 1745. (It reopened as a pottery in 1764.) In 1737, the White Rock copper works at Pentrechwyth was established. By 1780 there were three copper works on the east bank of the river: White Rock, Middle and Upper Bank. On the west bank there was also one at Forest. By 1800 nine copper smelters were in production in the valley. By 1860 the lower Swansea valley was smelting two thirds of the copper ores imported to Britain, and changes in the output and economy of the Swansea valley had a significant effect on global copper prices.

== Post-War industry ==
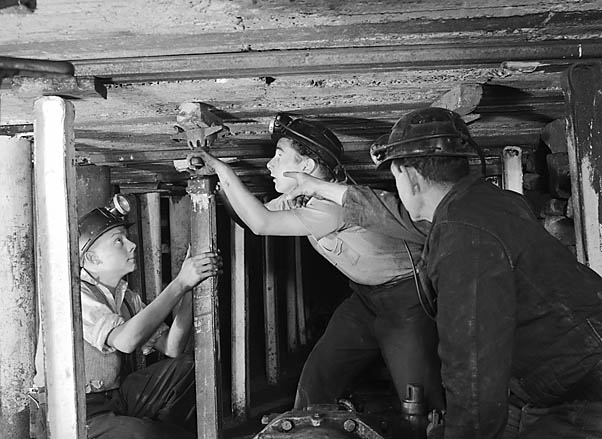
Aberaman Miners Training Centre, 1951

The period following the Second World War saw a decline in several of the traditional industries, in particular the coal industry. The numbers employed in the South Wales coalfield, which at its peak around 1913 employed over 250,000 men, fell to around 75,000 in the mid-1960s and 30,000 in 1979. The coal mining industry in Britain was nationalised in 1947, meaning that Welsh collieries were controlled by the National Coal Board (NCB) and regulated by HM Inspectorate of Mines. This period also saw the Aberfan disaster in 1966, when a tip of coal slurry slid down to engulf a school with 144 dead, most of them children. By the early 1990s there was only one deep pit still working in Wales. Tower Colliery, Hirwaun remained open until it was last worked in 2008 after being a co-operative since 1994. There was a similar decline in the steel industry, and the Welsh economy, like that of other developed societies, became increasingly based on the expanding service sector.

== Society ==
=== Uprisings ===
The social effects of industrialisation led to bitter social conflict between the Welsh workers and predominantly English factory and mine owners. During the 1830s there were two armed uprisings, in Merthyr Tydfil in 1831, and the Chartist uprising in Newport in 1839, led by John Frost. The Rebecca riots, which took place between 1839 and 1844 in South Wales and Mid Wales were rural in origin. They were a protest not only against the high tolls which had to be paid on the local turnpike roads but against rural deprivation.

=== Treason of the Blue Books ===
Partly as a result of these disturbances, a government inquiry was carried out into the state of education in Wales. The inquiry was carried out by three English commissioners who spoke no Welsh and relied on information from witnesses, many of them Anglican clergymen. Their report, published in 1847 as Reports of the Commissioners of Inquiry into the State of Education in Wales concluded that the Welsh were ignorant, lazy and immoral, and that this was caused by the Welsh language and nonconformity. This resulted in a furious reaction in Wales, where the affair was commonly named the "Treason of the Blue Books".

=== Socialism ===
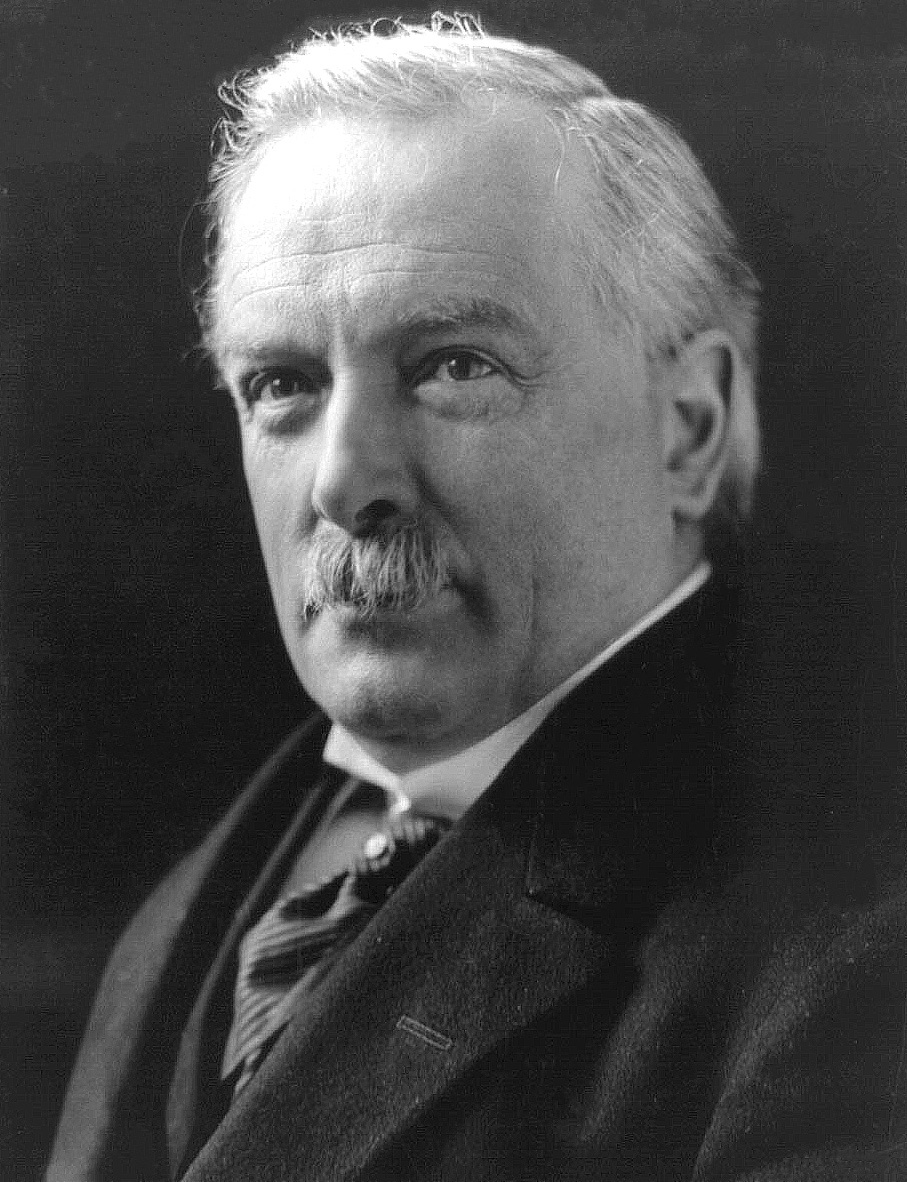
David Lloyd George

Socialism gained ground rapidly in the industrial areas of South Wales in the latter part of the century, accompanied by the increasing politicisation of religious Nonconformism. The first Labour MP, Keir Hardie, was elected as junior member for the Welsh constituency of Merthyr Tydfil and Aberdare in 1900. In common with many European nations, the first movements for national autonomy began in the 1880s and 1890s with the formation of Cymru Fydd, led by Liberal Party politicians such as T. E. Ellis and David Lloyd George.

== See also ==
- History of the Welsh economy
