= Theatre of Wales =

Theatrical works associated with Wales

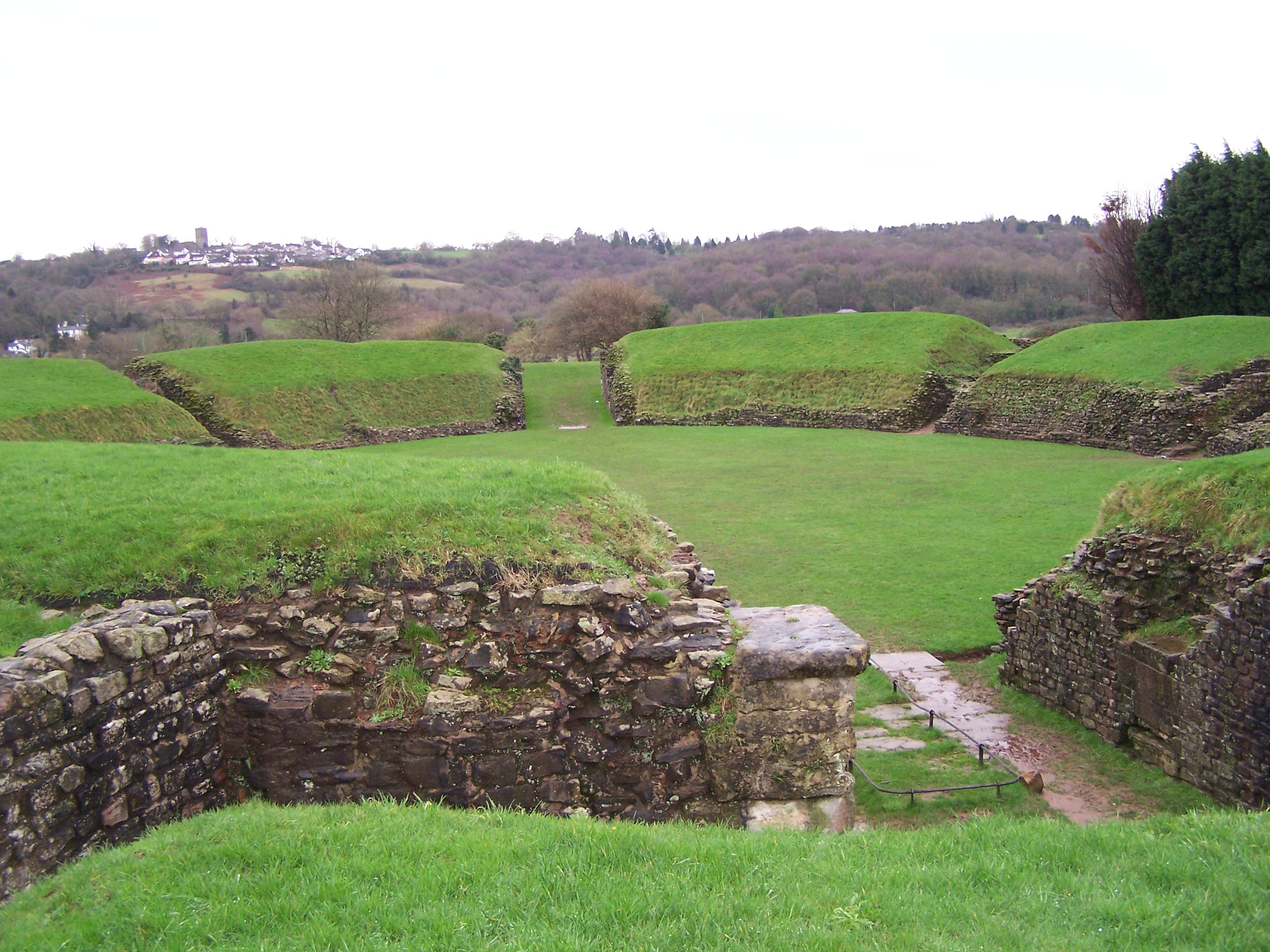
Remains of the Roman amphitheatre at Caerleon, perhaps the oldest purpose built theatrical space in Wales

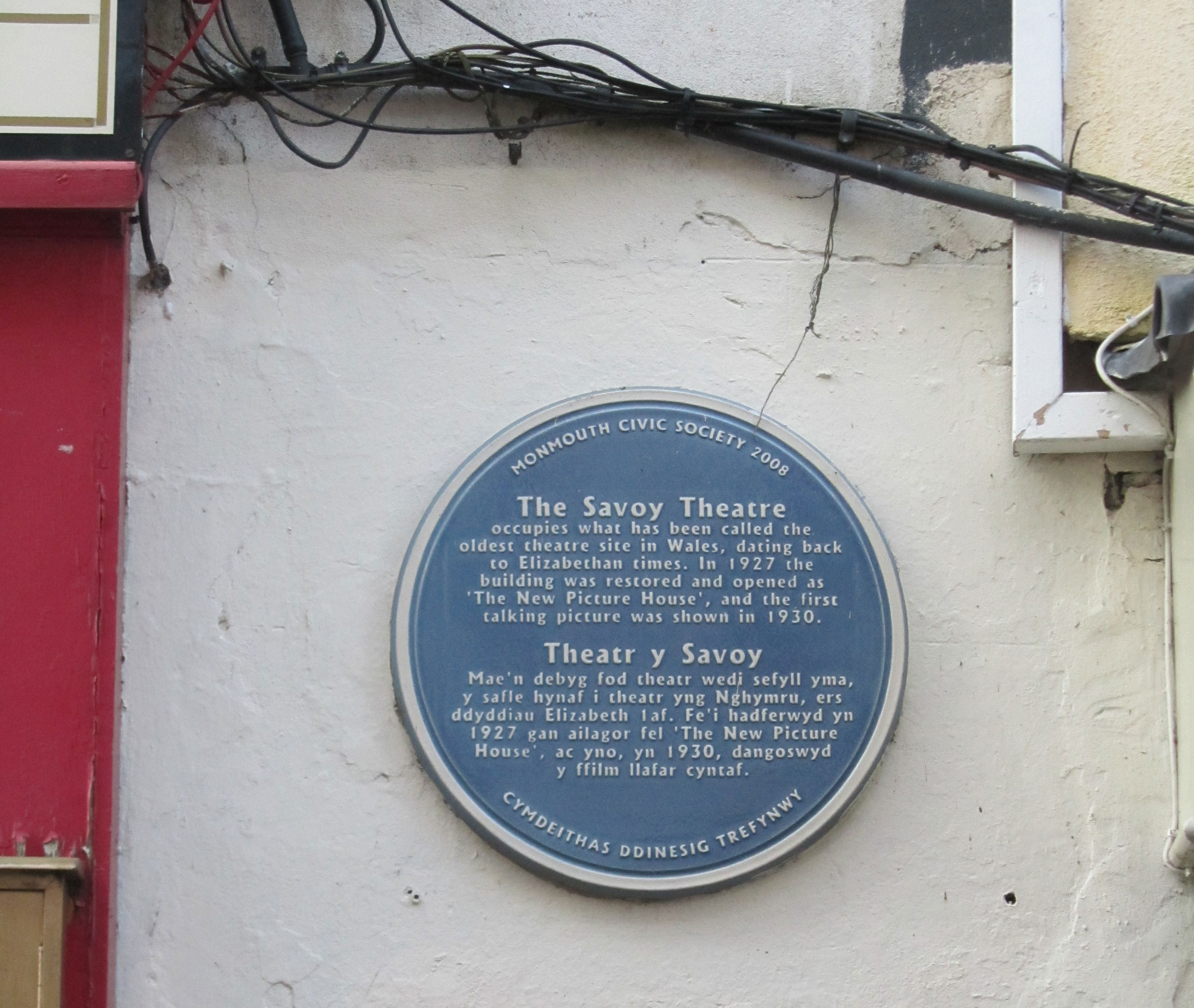
Savoy Theatre, Monmouth: "The Savoy Theatre occupies what has been called the oldest theatre site in Wales, dating back to Elizabethan times. In 1927 the building was restored and opened as 'The New Picture House', and the first talking picture was shown in 1930"

Theatre in Wales includes dramatic works in both the Welsh language and English language. Actors from Wales have also achieved international recognition.

== History ==
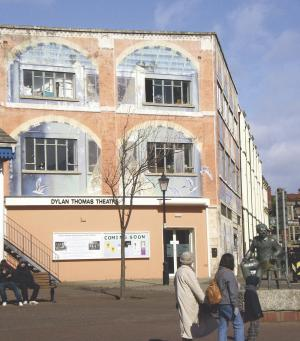
Dylan Thomas Theatre, Swansea

=== Middle Ages ===
The earliest known performance tradition is that of the mumming custom Mari Lwyd. However, the existence of a Roman amphitheatre at Caerleon suggests that drama may well have been introduced during the classical period.

Drama in Wales as a literary tradition dates to morality plays from north-east Wales in the second half of the 15th century. Two extant miracle plays Y tri Brenin o Gwlen ("The three kings from Cologne") and Y Dioddefaint a'r Atgyfodiad ("The Passion and the Resurrection") represent short individual plays rather than being elements of a larger cycle. Ymddiddan y Corff a'r Enaid ("Conversation of the body and the soul") can be compared to the Everyman tradition.

=== Modern era ===
The development of Renaissance theatre in England did not have great influence in Wales, as the gentry found different forms of artistic patronage. One surviving example of Welsh literary drama is Troelus a Chresyd, an anonymous adaptation from poems by Henrysoun and Chaucer dating to around 1600. With no urban centres to compare to England to support regular stages, morality plays and interludes continued to circulate in inn-yard theatres and fairs, supplemented by visiting troupes performing English repertoire.

Stock Welsh characters occur in theatre in England on the Tudor and Stuart stage. Fluellen is a fictional character in the play Henry V by William Shakespeare. Snatches of dialogue and words in Welsh appear in plays such as John Fletcher's The Night Walker, Thomas Middleton's A Chaste Maid in Cheapside, Northward Ho by Thomas Dekker and John Webster, Patient Grissel by Thomas Dekker, Henry Chettle, and William Haughton, The Valiant Welshman, and Ben Jonson's masque For the Honour of Wales.

Twm o'r Nant (1739–1810) was famous for his anterliwtau (interludes), performed mainly around his native Denbighshire. The bawdiness and licensed foolery of the comic stereotypes of the interlude tradition have been compared to commedia dell'arte. However the religious revival connected with the rise of Methodism in Wales brought an end to such libertine satires. Interludes came to be replaced as expressions of public drama by a high-flown and imagistic preaching style and dialogues on moral issues such as temperance.

The English classical repertoire was brought to those who could understand it by travelling troupes such as the Kemble family (Charles Kemble was born at Brecon in 1775).

=== Into the 20th century ===
In the late 19th century and early 20th century, Welsh literature began to reflect the way the Welsh language was increasingly becoming a political symbol. Secular drama began to attract interest in the 1870s as national consciousness grew. Plays in a Shakespearean style were written, such as Beriah Gwynfe Evans' patriotic play Owain Glyndŵr, performed at the Llanberis Eisteddfod of 1879.

There was institutional opposition to the new drama. The Methodist Convention in 1887 recommended that chapels regard theatrical activity as an immoral practice on a par with gambling. It was not until 1902 when David Lloyd George called for patronage of Welsh drama at the National Eisteddfod that drama started to be respectable among devout communities.

With the advance of the English language, theatre in English developed quickly between 1875 and 1925. By 1912 Wales had 34 theatres and many halls licensed for dramatic performances. However, the arrival of sound cinema in the 1930s led to the closure or transformation of most theatres.

A full theatre tradition only developed in Wales with 20th century Welsh drama. Many playwrights were inspired by the example of the Abbey Theatre, Dublin. Thomas Scott-Ellis, 8th Baron Howard de Walden, used his patronage to attempt the foundation of a national theatre for Wales. Among his attempts was the foundation of a bilingual theatre at Plas Newydd, Llangollen in the 1930s. He also exercised his patronage in favour of playwrights including John Oswald Francis and Robert Griffith Berry.

=== Inter-war period ===
The inter-war period has been described as a golden age of amateur dramatics, with five hundred companies active all over Wales providing a second occupation for large numbers of quarrymen and miners. This flourishing tradition was curtailed by the outbreak of the Second World War and ended by the arrival of television in the 1950s.

Saunders Lewis (1893–1985) was above all a dramatist. His earliest published play was Blodeuwedd (The woman of flowers) (1923–25, revised 1948). Other notable plays include Buchedd Garmon (The life of Germanus) (radio play, 1936) and several others after the war. Siwan (1956) together with Blodeuwedd are considered as the "canonical examples of Welsh language drama" He also translated Samuel Beckett's En attendant Godot into Welsh.

Emlyn Williams (1905–1987) became an overnight star with his thriller Night Must Fall (1935), in which he also played the lead role of a psychopathic murderer. The play was noted for its exploration of the killer's complex psychological state, a step forward for its genre. It was made into a film in 1937 and has been frequently revived. The Corn is Green (1938) was partly based on his own childhood in Wales. He starred as a Welsh schoolboy in the play's London premiere. The play came to Broadway in 1940 and was turned into a film. His autobiographical light comedy, The Druid's Rest was first performed at the St Martin's Theatre, London, in 1944. It saw the stage debut of Richard Burton whom Williams had spotted at an audition in Cardiff.

=== Post war ===
Professional theatre developed in Wales in the 1950s and 1960s.

Under Milk Wood is a 1954 radio drama by Dylan Thomas, adapted later as a stage play. The play had its first reading on stage on 14 May 1953, in New York, at The Poetry Center at 92nd Street Y. Thomas himself read the parts of the First Voice and the Reverend Eli Jenkins. Almost as an afterthought, the performance was recorded on a single-microphone tape recording (the microphone was laid at front center on the stage floor) and later issued by the Caedmon company. It is the only known recorded performance of Under Milk Wood with Thomas in the cast. A studio recording, planned for 1954, was precluded by Thomas's death in November 1953. The BBC first broadcast Under Milk Wood, a new 'Play for Voices', on the Third Programme on 25 January 1954 (two months after Dylan's death), although several sections were omitted. The play was recorded with a distinguished, all-Welsh cast including Richard Burton as 'First Voice', with production by Douglas Cleverdon. The play won the Prix Italia award for radio drama that year.

Cynan (Albert Evans-Jones) was influential in the field of Welsh drama. He wrote two full-length plays. Hywel Harris won the premier Eisteddfod prize for drama in 1931. He was commissioned to write an exemplary play for the National Eisteddfod in 1957; his offering Absolom Fy Mab was accepted to great critical acclaim in Welsh dramatic circles, as were his translations of two English language plays: John Masefield's Good Friday and Norman Nicholson's The Old Man of the Mountain. In 1931 he was appointed reader of Welsh plays on behalf of the Lord Chamberlain, a post which he held till the abolition of censorship in 1968. He was seen as a liberal censor, having allowed James Kitchener Davies' drama Cwm Glo, a play full of "filth and depravation", to be performed after it won the drama prize in the 1934 Eisteddfod.

=== 21st Century ===
Wales has two national theatres: Theatr Genedlaethol Cymru (the Welsh language national theatre of Wales, founded 2003), and National Theatre Wales (the English language national theatre company of Wales, founded 2009). Theatr Genedlaethol Cymru attempts to shape a distinctive identity for drama in Welsh while also opening it up to outside linguistic and dramatic influences.

Modern theatre in Wales is recorded on the website www.theatre-wales.co.uk, an archive of 4600 reviews and articles.

== See also ==
- English drama
- List of theatres in Wales
- List of theatres in the United Kingdom
- Theatre of Scotland
- Irish theatre
