= List of UK city regions by population =

This is a list of city regions in the United Kingdom by population, area and population density. They consist of Combined authorities in England, and regional city deals in Scotland and in Wales. Data is gathered by the Office for National Statistics (ONS).

Despite the terminology, which is also used by the ONS, the city regions are established on the basis of local devolution deals, which results in also less populated areas being included within this list, whilst some other major cities in the UK might be excluded. The list also does not delineate metropolitan or urban areas, which are separate concepts.

== 2022 ==
The following is the list of city regions for the year 2022 as provided by the ONS.

UK city regions by population 2022
Rank	City region	Location	Population	Area (km^{2})	Population density (per km^{2})
1	Greater London	England	8866180	1572	5640
2	West Midlands	England	2953816	902	3275
3	Greater Manchester	England	2911744	1276	2282
4	West Yorkshire	England	2378148	2029	1172
5	The North East	England	1994284	7786	256
6	Glasgow City Region	Scotland	1838204	3504	525
7	Liverpool City Region	England	1571045	903	1740
8	Cardiff Capital Region	Wales	1541014	2809	549
9	Edinburgh and South East Scotland City Region	Scotland	1398792	7781	180
10	South Yorkshire	England	1392105	1552	897
11	Belfast City Region	Northern Ireland	1130125	1186	953
12	Swansea Bay City Region	Wales	696924	4805	145
13	Greater Brighton City Region	England	996179	1245	800
14	West of England	England	969407	1332	728
15	Cambridgeshire and Peterborough	England	906814	3389	268
16	Tay Cities Region	Scotland	787724	5450	145
17	Tees Valley	England	688756	790	872
18	North Wales	Wales	688201	6172	112
19	Highlands and Islands	Scotland	489913	39050	13
20	Mid South West Growth Deal	Northern Ireland	488266	10000	49
21	Aberdeen City Region	Scotland	487240	4330	113
22	Ayrshire	Scotland	366523	3370	109
23	Forth Valley Region	Scotland	303914	1135	268
24	South of Scotland	Scotland	263254	11000	24
25	Mid-Wales	Wales	205501	3607	57
26	Derry-Londonderry City Region	Northern Ireland	150836	1350	112
27	Causeway Coast and Glens	Northern Ireland	141316	1968	72
28	Scottish Island Councils	Scotland	71696	7600	9

=== New deals since 2022 ===
The North East Combined Authority did not exist in 2022, it is the result of a merger between the earlier non-mayoral North East Combined Authority and the North of Tyne Combined Authority, however it is included due to data for 2022 being available. In addition, new local devolution deals have been established since 2022, and they are not included in the table above. These city regions are:

- East Midlands CCA, comprising Nottinghamshire and Derbyshire (including Nottingham and Derby unitary authorities), with a population of 2 230 289.
- York and North Yorkshire, with a population of 828 052.

== See also ==
- Demographics of the United Kingdom
