= Birmingham metropolitan area =

In the West Midlands region of England

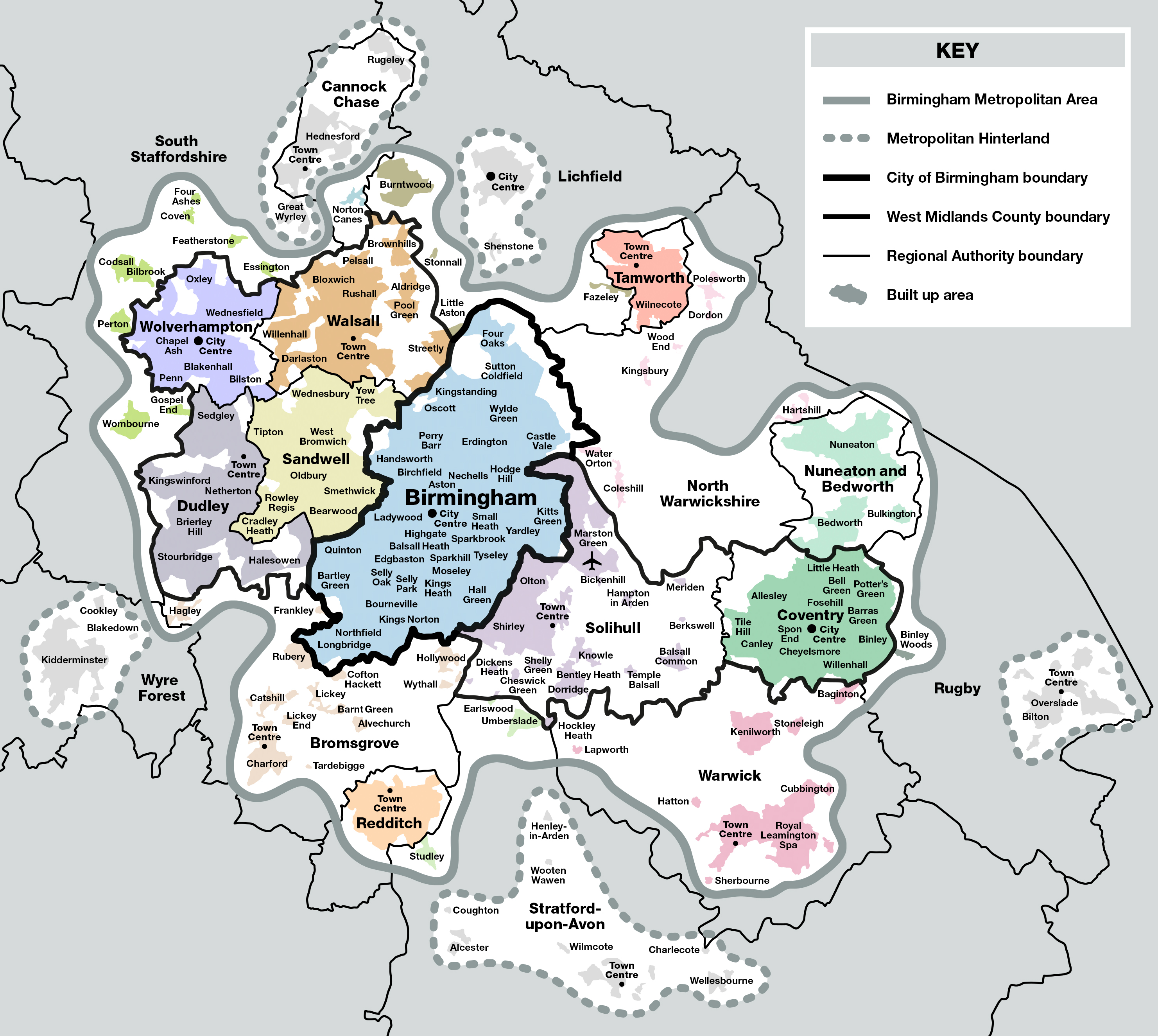
Map of the Birmingham Metropolitan Area showing its built-up areas, morphological boundaries and catchment zones.

The Birmingham Metropolitan Area is an urban agglomeration located in the West Midlands region of England with a population of around 4.3 million people, making it the second largest metropolitan area in the United Kingdom. It comprises the three cities (Birmingham, Coventry, Wolverhampton) and four metropolitan boroughs (Dudley, Sandwell, Solihull, Walsall) which make up the Metropolitan county of the West Midlands, along with its commuter zones, which extend into the neighbouring district authorities of Bromsgrove and Redditch in Worcestershire; Cannock Chase, Lichfield, South Staffordshire and Tamworth in Staffordshire; and all five district authorities of Warwickshire, including the towns of Bedworth, Coleshill, Nuneaton, Royal Leamington Spa, and Warwick itself.

A number of sizeable settlements fall outside the morphological boundaries of the Birmingham Metropolitan Area but still form part of its economic and infrastructural hinterland. Amongst these, the cathedral city of Lichfield, the towns of Cannock, Hednesford and Rugeley in Staffordshire, Rugby and Stratford-upon-Avon in Warwickshire, and Kidderminster in the Wyre Forest District of Worcestershire.

Like other regional conurbations in the United Kingdom, the Birmingham Metropolitan Area is polycentric, with several primary urban areas and satellite towns overlaying traditional market towns and civil parishes, separated by areas of protected green space. This is reflected in a diverse urban landscape characterised by examples of Medieval, Tudor, Jacobean, English Baroque, Georgian, Victorian, Edwardian, Modern, Postmodern and Contemporary architecture.

The metro area acts as a major international commercial centre and an important transport, retail, events and conference hub. Birmingham New Street railway station is the busiest railway station in the United Kingdom outside of London. Its metropolitan economy is a significant economic powerhouse for the Midlands and is the second-largest in the United Kingdom with a GDP of $121.1bn (2014). It is also a region of multiple higher education institutions, including the University of Birmingham, making it the largest centre of higher education in the country outside London.

Tourism is a large part of economic activity for the metro area. Birmingham is the third most visited city in the United Kingdom by people from foreign nations as of 2022. The City of Birmingham Symphony Orchestra, the Birmingham Royal Ballet, the Birmingham Repertory Theatre, the Library of Birmingham and the Barber Institute of Fine Arts all enjoy international reputations. Stratford-upon-Avon is a site of significant tourist interest, being the birth town of William Shakespeare.

== See also ==
- List of urban areas in the United Kingdom
- Birmingham
- West Midlands conurbation (also referred to as the Birmingham urban area)
