= Cardiff–South Wales Valleys metropolitan area =

Metropolitan area in south-east Wales

- ESPON metropolitan area
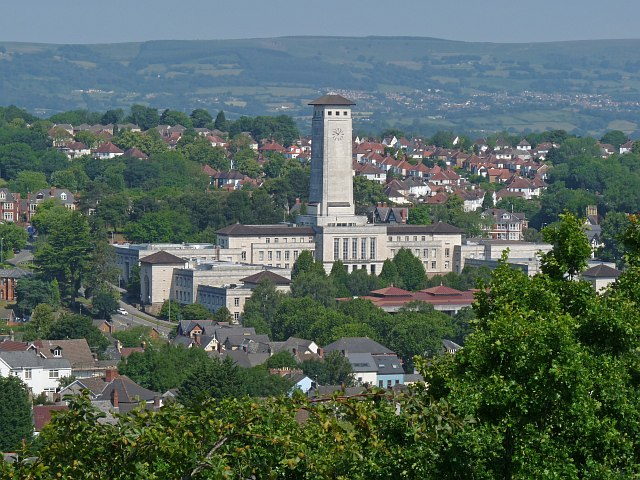
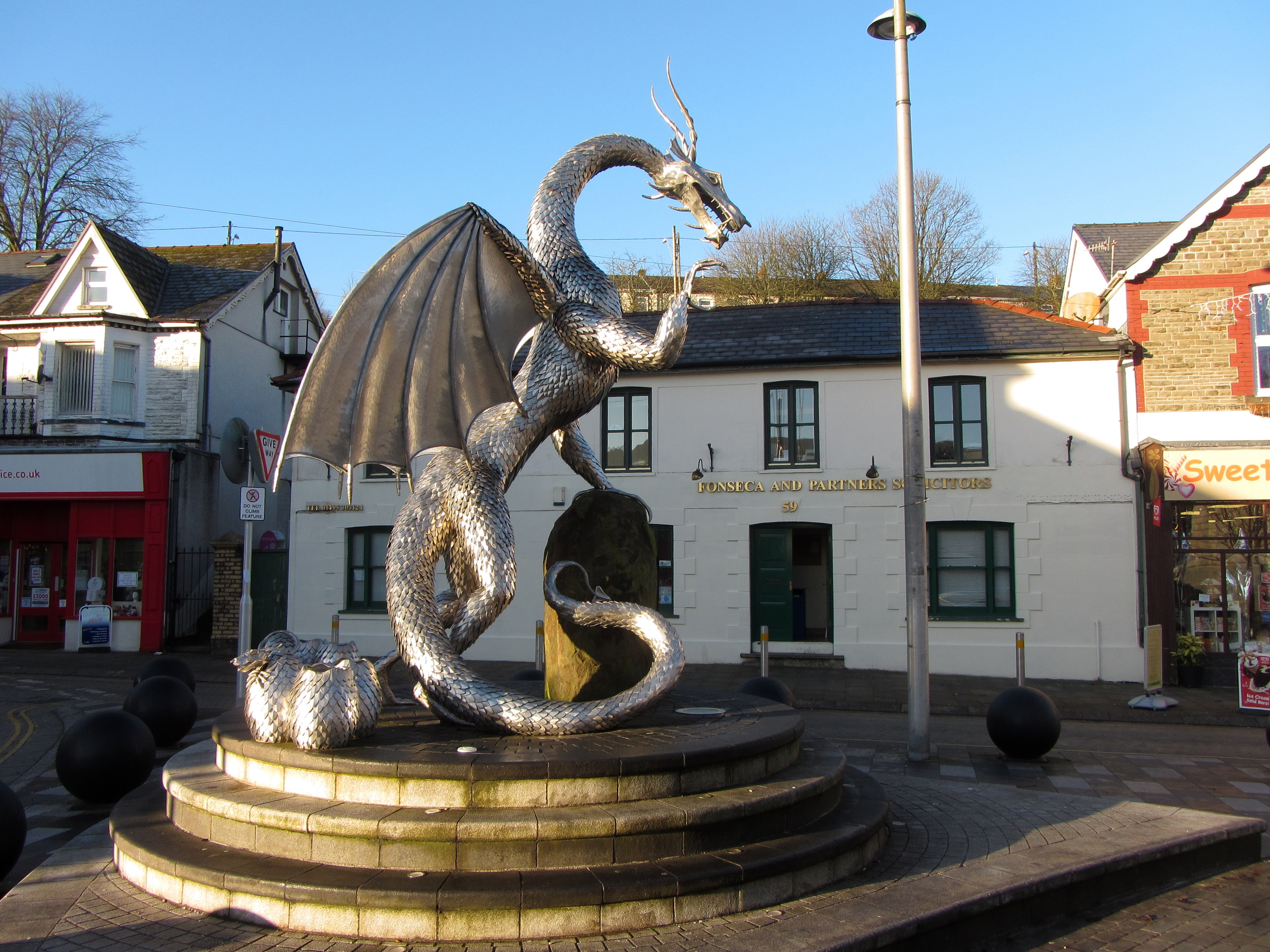
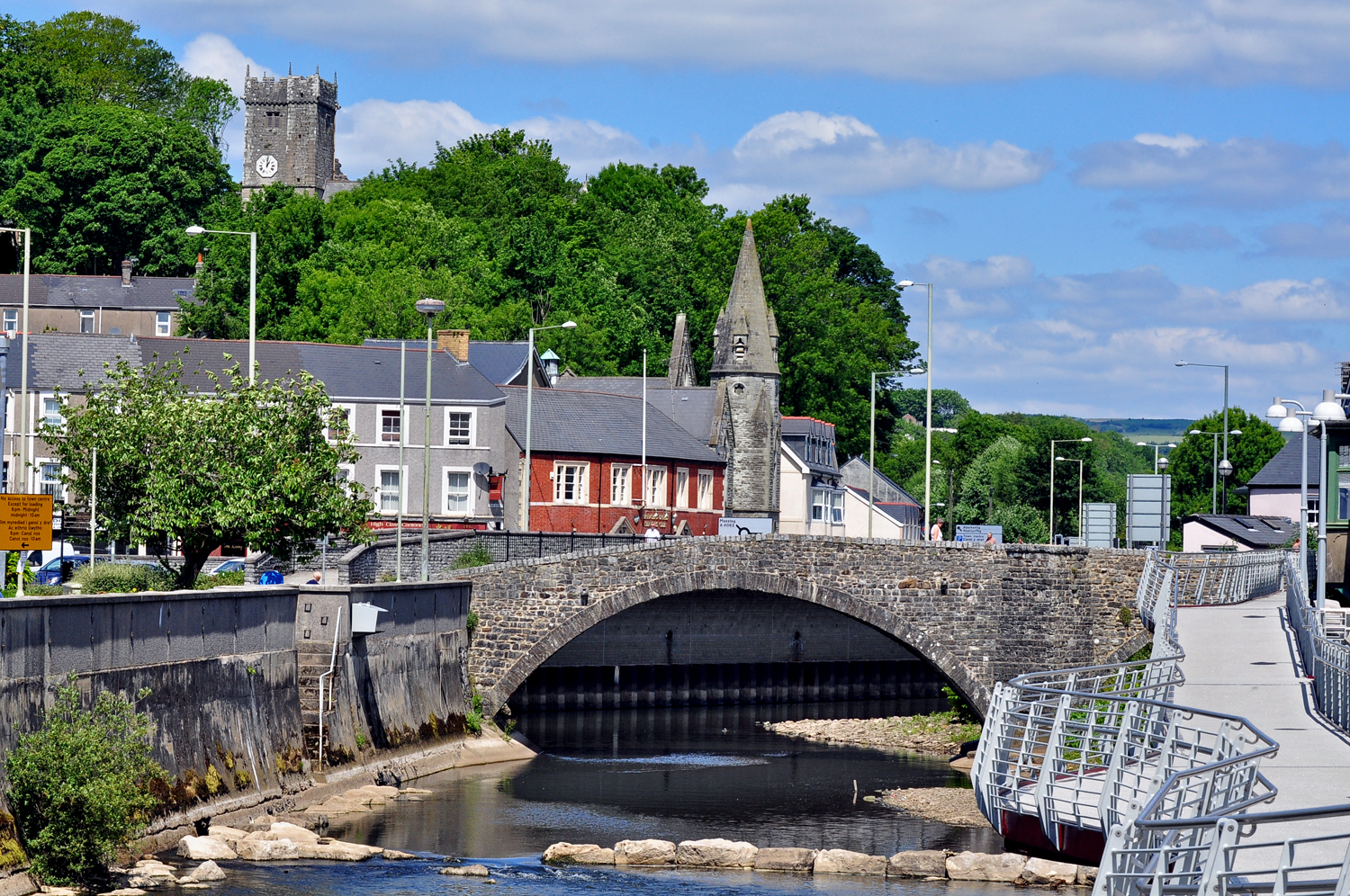
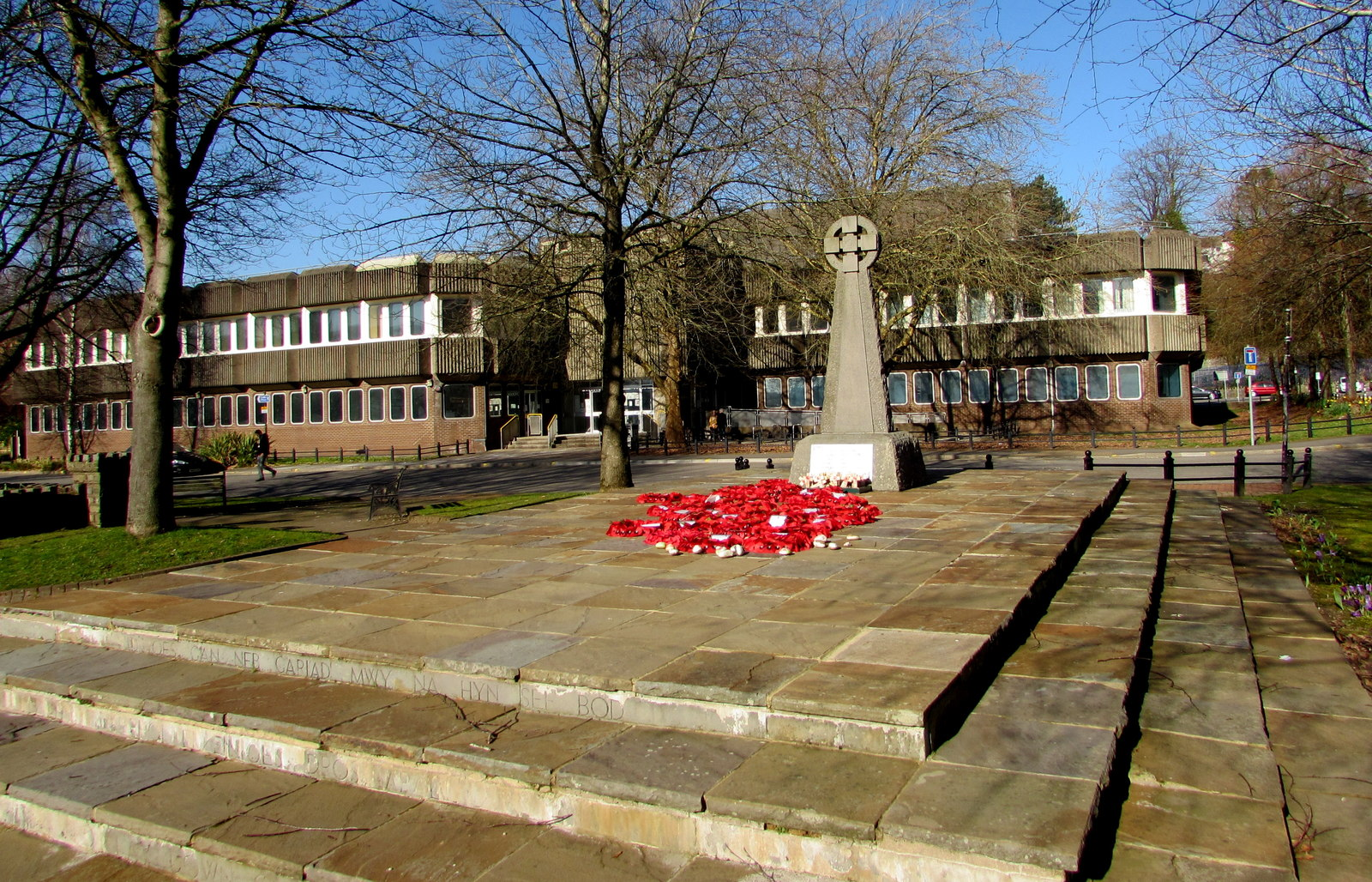
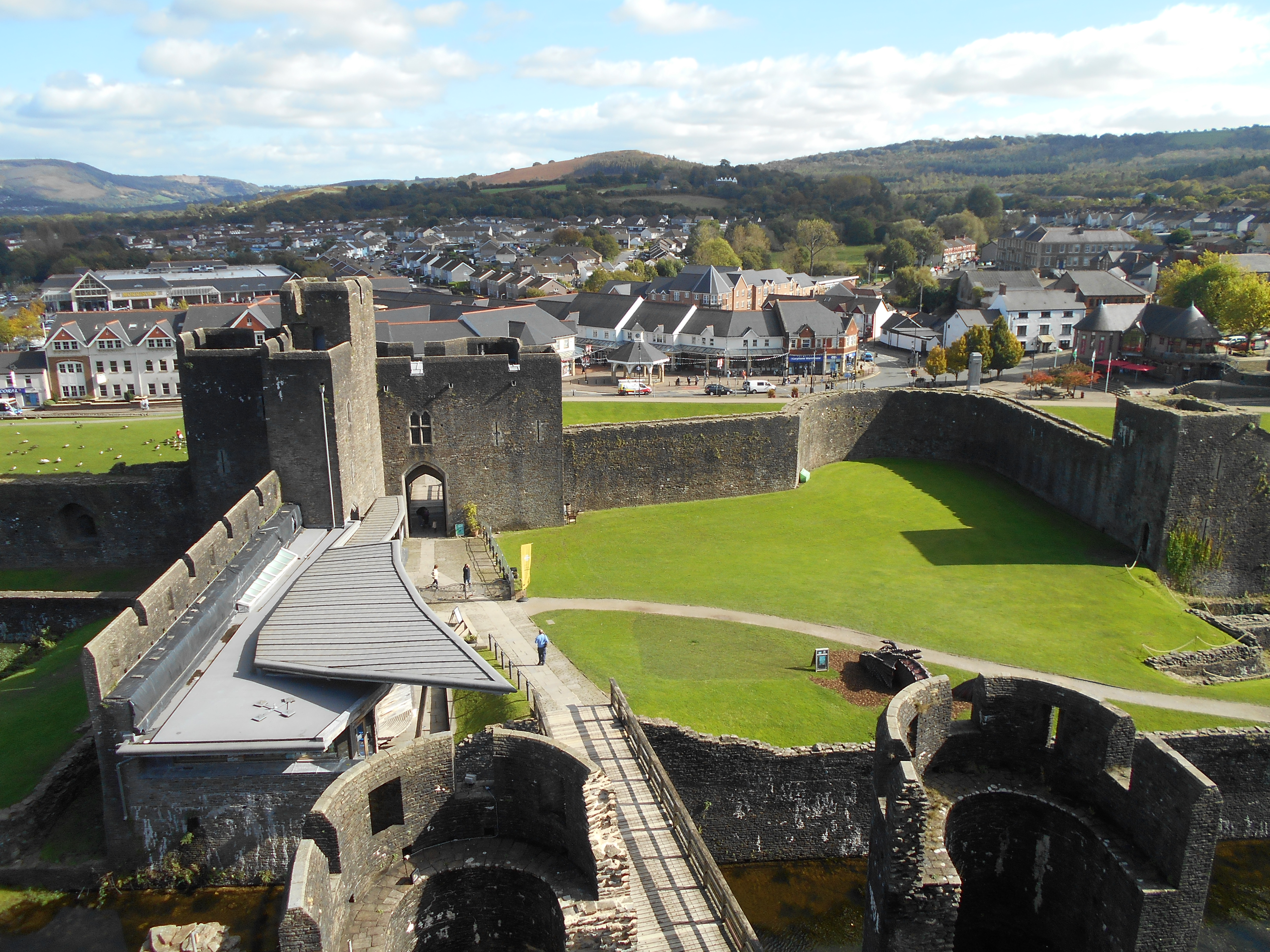
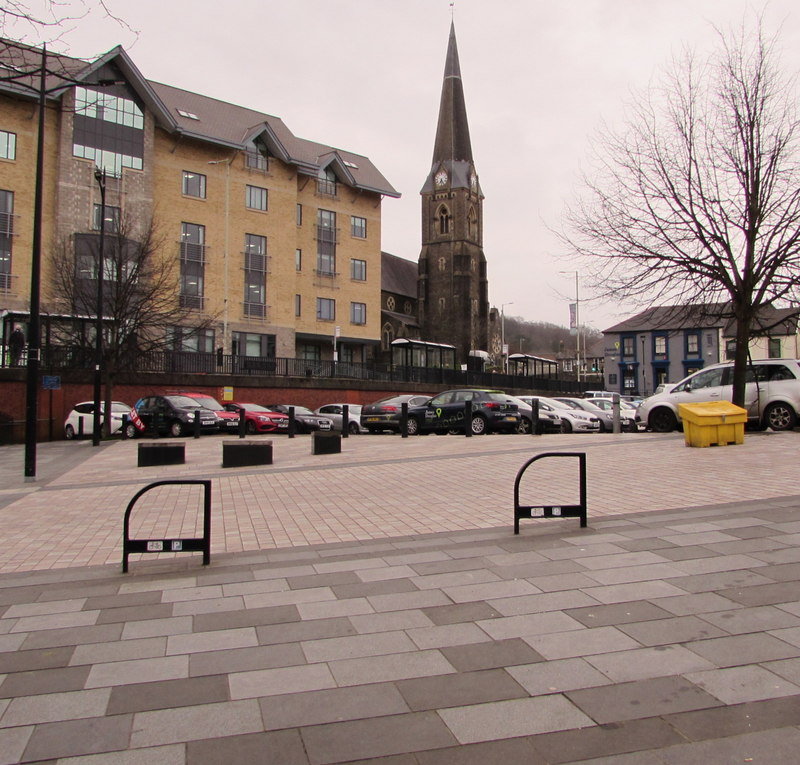
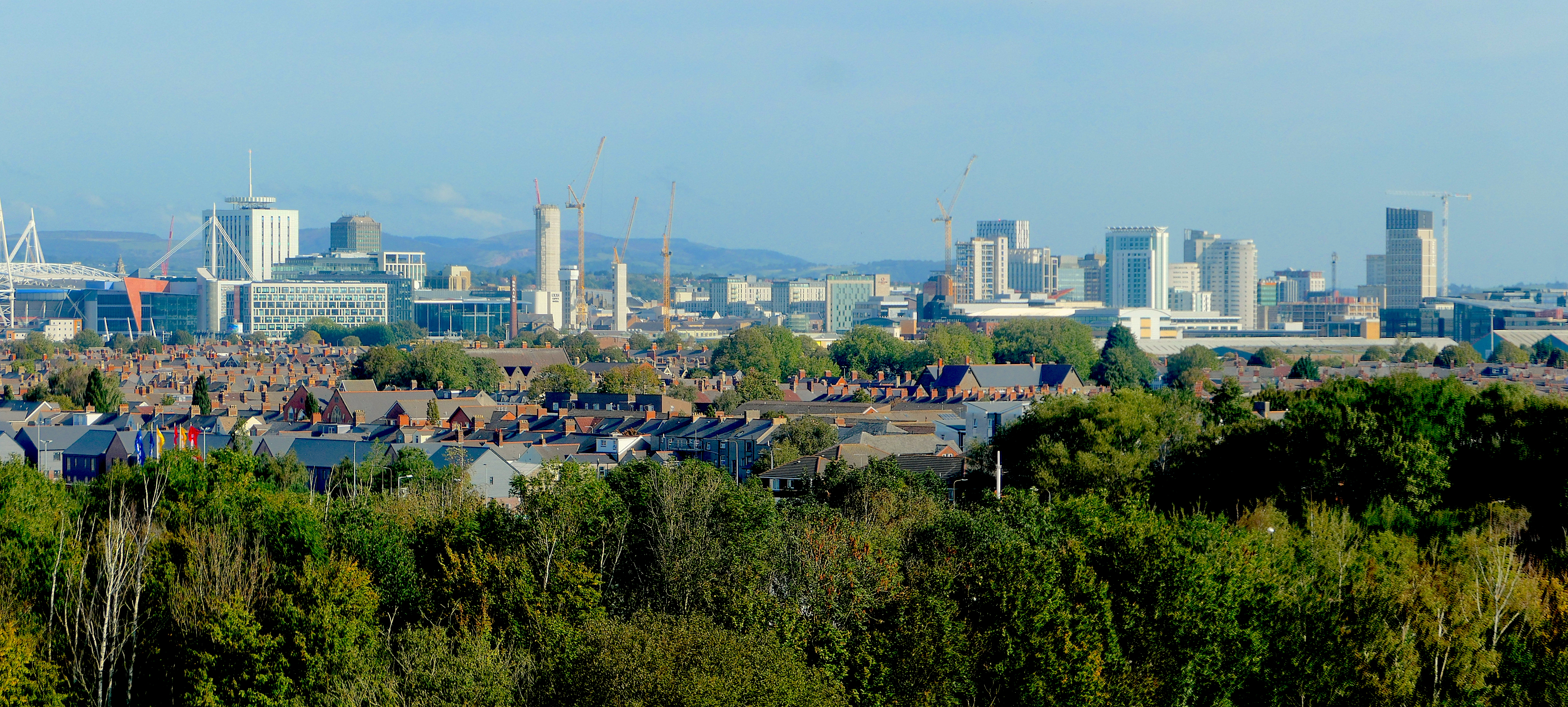
- Left to right: Newport and Ebbw Vale; Bridgend and Merthyr Tydfil; Caerphilly and Pontypridd; Cardiff
- Interactive map of Cardiff–South Wales Valleys metropolitan area
- Coordinates: 51°31′44″N 3°15′07″W
- Sovereign state: United Kingdom
- Country: Wales

Population
  - Metro (2001): 1.097 million

The ESPON Cardiff–South Wales Valleys metropolitan area was a metropolitan area used by the European Spatial Planning Observation Network (ESPON) of the European Union. The area included parts of south-east Wales, specifically covering the morphological urban areas of the cities of Cardiff and Newport, and of the towns of Merthyr Tydfil, Pontypridd, Caerphilly, Bridgend and Ebbw Vale, in the South Wales Valleys.

It covers the preserved counties of Gwent and South Glamorgan. In a 2007 report, ESPON stated it had a population of 1.097 million, making it the largest and only ESPON metropolitan area in Wales, with the next largest being centred on the city of Swansea and its urban area.

The ESPON defined the "Cardiff and South Wales valleys metropolitan area" by 2007, to cover the following three types of subdivision:

- The previous Cardiff (272,000) and Newport (116,000) areas classed under ESPON 1.1.1
- The corresponding morphological urban areas of Cardiff, Newport, Merthyr Tydfil, Pontypridd, Caerphilly, Bridgend, and Ebbw Vale.

The metropolitan area includes areas within the then NUTS 3 statistical regions of Central Valleys (Merthyr Tydfil, Rhondda Cynon Taf), Gwent Valleys (Blaenau Gwent, Caerphilly, Torfaen), Bridgend–Neath Port Talbot, Monmouthshire–Newport, and Cardiff–Vale of Glamorgan.

Metropolitan area	Morphological Urban Area	MUA Population (2001 ESPON)	Includes parts of NUTS3 subdivisions
Cardiff–South Wales Valleys	Cardiff	353,000	UKL15 (Central Valleys: Merthyr Tydfil, Rhondda Cynon Taf) UKL16 (Gwent Valleys: Blaenau Gwent, Caerphilly, Torfaen) UKL17 (Bridgend and Neath Port Talbot) UKL21 (Monmouthshire and Newport) UKL22 (Cardiff and Vale of Glamorgan)
Cardiff–South Wales Valleys	Newport	153,302	UKL15 (Central Valleys: Merthyr Tydfil, Rhondda Cynon Taf) UKL16 (Gwent Valleys: Blaenau Gwent, Caerphilly, Torfaen) UKL17 (Bridgend and Neath Port Talbot) UKL21 (Monmouthshire and Newport) UKL22 (Cardiff and Vale of Glamorgan)
Cardiff–South Wales Valleys	Bridgend	49,404	UKL15 (Central Valleys: Merthyr Tydfil, Rhondda Cynon Taf) UKL16 (Gwent Valleys: Blaenau Gwent, Caerphilly, Torfaen) UKL17 (Bridgend and Neath Port Talbot) UKL21 (Monmouthshire and Newport) UKL22 (Cardiff and Vale of Glamorgan)
Cardiff–South Wales Valleys	Merthyr Tydfil	43,820	UKL15 (Central Valleys: Merthyr Tydfil, Rhondda Cynon Taf) UKL16 (Gwent Valleys: Blaenau Gwent, Caerphilly, Torfaen) UKL17 (Bridgend and Neath Port Talbot) UKL21 (Monmouthshire and Newport) UKL22 (Cardiff and Vale of Glamorgan)
Cardiff–South Wales Valleys	Caerphilly	41,402	UKL15 (Central Valleys: Merthyr Tydfil, Rhondda Cynon Taf) UKL16 (Gwent Valleys: Blaenau Gwent, Caerphilly, Torfaen) UKL17 (Bridgend and Neath Port Talbot) UKL21 (Monmouthshire and Newport) UKL22 (Cardiff and Vale of Glamorgan)
Cardiff–South Wales Valleys	Pontypridd	32,694	UKL15 (Central Valleys: Merthyr Tydfil, Rhondda Cynon Taf) UKL16 (Gwent Valleys: Blaenau Gwent, Caerphilly, Torfaen) UKL17 (Bridgend and Neath Port Talbot) UKL21 (Monmouthshire and Newport) UKL22 (Cardiff and Vale of Glamorgan)
Cardiff–South Wales Valleys	Ebbw Vale	18,558	UKL15 (Central Valleys: Merthyr Tydfil, Rhondda Cynon Taf) UKL16 (Gwent Valleys: Blaenau Gwent, Caerphilly, Torfaen) UKL17 (Bridgend and Neath Port Talbot) UKL21 (Monmouthshire and Newport) UKL22 (Cardiff and Vale of Glamorgan)
Total population: 1.09 million	Total population of MUAs:	692,180	

== See also ==
- ESPON metropolitan areas in the United Kingdom
- South East Wales
- Cardiff Capital Region
