= Regional economy in Wales =

Four regional economic boards in Wales

Map of the four regions with growth/city deals in Wales North Wales Economic Ambition Board (North Wales Growth Deal) Growing Mid Wales Partnership (Mid Wales Growth Deal) Cardiff Capital Region (Cardiff Capital Region City Deal) Swansea Bay City Region (Swansea Bay City Deal)

Regional economy in Wales is centred on four regional economic boards in Wales. Each board oversees a city or growth deal, signed between 2016 and 2022, lasting 10–15 years. Two of the deals are city deals signed and proposed by their respective economic boards, and their areas are described as "city regions"; the Cardiff Capital Region and Swansea Bay City Region. Whereas in North Wales, the North Wales Economic Ambition Board negotiated a North Wales growth deal signed in 2020, and in Mid Wales, the Growing Mid Wales Partnership, led negotiations for a Mid Wales growth deal signed in 2022. The programmes are based on the City deal and Growth deal initiatives set up by the Coalition UK Government in 2012, to promote the decentralisation of the UK economy, by stimulating local economic growth.

== History ==
The initiative began under the Conservative-Liberal Democrat coalition, although no areas in Wales were included in either of the first two waves between 2012 and 2014 under the Coalition government. The initiatives have become one of the main tools for stimulating economic growth outside London to other major economic and urban centres.

UK Government budgets in spring 2015 and in 2016 announced the opening of negotiations with the Welsh Government and local partners for the Cardiff Capital Region and Swansea Bay city deals respectively, following the success of the initiative in England's urban centres.

The first Welsh city deal was signed for the Cardiff Capital Region on 15 March 2016 with the next deal for the Swansea Bay was signed on 20 March 2017.

The North Wales Economic Ambition Board published the "Growth Vision for the Economy of North Wales" in September 2016, setting out the regional plan for improving infrastructure, skills, employment, business growth and innovation. In the March 2017 UK budget, the UK Government announced it was looking forward to proposals for a North Wales Growth Deal.

In November 2017, the National Assembly for Wales' Economy, Infrastructure and Skills Committee recommended to the Welsh Government, that a duty should be placed on regional bodies for promoting the development of the regional economy, and that it should give discretion to the regional bodies over the substantial spending of funds, whether raised regionally or provided by the government. Such transfer of decision-making, may be interpreted as the devolution of some financial powers to the regional bodies from the Welsh Government. Then Cabinet Secretary for Finance Mark Drakeford AM, and Cabinet Secretary for Economy and Transport, Ken Skates AM, rejected the recommendation in a joint response on behalf of the Welsh Government.

The North Wales Growth Deal was signed on 17 December 2020, with the Mid Wales Growth Deal signed on 13 January 2022.

In March 2021, UK Chancellor, Rishi Sunak, announced that three deals in Wales would receive their funding over a shorter period, with allocated funding provided earlier than agreed in the deals. Earlier funding would save local authorities in repayment costs and allow invested projects in the deals to progress at a quicker pace. Swansea Bay would see an extra £5.4 million, North Wales £4.4 million and Mid Wales £1.8 million per year for the remaining years for their respective deals. Totaling to £58.7 million over the next five years. The announcement was done without consulting the Welsh Government.

In May 2021, funding for the next five years of the Cardiff Capital Region City Deal were approved following the conclusion of a gateway review, which occur every five years during the deal's operation.

== Purpose ==
City or growth deals in Wales differ slightly from those signed in England. There is no transfer of powers from the UK Government to local authorities over financial and planning matters, as the Senedd and the Welsh Government, are responsible for such powers and may request to retain them. Therefore, city or growth deals in Wales have been merely described as purely economic stimulation packages tailor-made for specific areas of Wales, rather than granting areas increased autonomy in financing and economic planning. Various projects can apply for deal funding, including transport and housing initiatives, with the regional economic boards having the responsibility on whether to grant funding and to decide how much funding should be allocated.

There are no Local Enterprise Partnerships (LEPs) in Wales as there are in England, as powers granted to LEPs are also already devolved. The public sector bodies involved in city or growth deals are, therefore, the UK Government, Welsh Government, and local authorities. Their purpose described by the Welsh Affairs Committee is to encourage additional UK Government and Welsh Government funding to their specific geographical areas.

There are no directly elected mayors for the regions in Wales, as there are in England.

There are concerns that City deals may increase inequalities between councils across Wales, as the benefits of the deals may be unevenly distributed through increasing regional competition.

== Committee review ==
In November 2017, the Economy, Infrastructure and Skills Committee of the National Assembly for Wales conducted a review into City Deals and the Regional Economies of Wales.

Their report provided eleven recommendations for the management and structure of the regional economy in Wales. Their recommendations include:

- Clarify scrutiny of the regional bodies
- Responsibly set up the regional boards to avoid another layer of bureaucracy
- Have clear expectations for initial gateway assessments and understand success and failure
- Encourage the construction of contingency plans in the event that UK Government funding is unavailable
- North Wales partners should work with other Welsh and English bodies for opportunities with the rest of Wales and across the England-Wales border
- Respect the responsibilities of public authorities under the Well-being and Future Generations Act
- Duty on regional bodies with discretion over spending
- Construct mechanisms to quickly learn from failures and adapt
- Welsh Government should continue to support and encourage the signing of the North Wales growth deal
- Regional boundaries should be ambiguous allowing for local authorities and private bodies near the boundaries to potentially be part of more than one region
- Sign a Mid Wales growth deal.

The Welsh Government responded stating they accepted five recommendations, accepting in principle a further three, but rejecting the recommendations to place a duty and discretion on regional bodies, and to have the regional boundaries to be flexible and "fuzzy".

== Regional deals ==
There are two city deals and two growth deals in operation in Wales. Funding for the deals from the UK Government is only guaranteed for the first five years of the deal's operation, for further funding, "Gateway Assessments" have to be performed to justify that further funding is necessary. Local authorities may be required to fill in the gaps in funding should the UK Government revoke funds.

=== City deals ===
City deals in Wales are agreements between the UK Government, Welsh Government, and a city or "city region". These agreements allow for a city and its surrounding area to increase their decision-making and responsibility on issues affecting their area. This includes making economic decisions over where public funding should be allocated, the most-effective way to support local growth of businesses and generally how to grow its economy.

==== Cardiff City Region City Deal ====
Covering ten local authorities in the south-east of Wales and centred on Cardiff, the Capital City of Wales, the Cardiff Capital Region City Deal was agreed between the local authorities, UK Government and Welsh Government on 15 March 2016. The deal includes a £1.2 billion investment fund, providing funding to various projects in the region over two decades. Part of the £1.2 billion has already been allocated towards the South Wales Metro (£734 million). The remaining are proposed to be used for other transport schemes in the region, housing investment, employment site investment, and for developing research and innovation facilities.

==== Swansea Bay City Deal ====
Covering the local authorities of Carmarthenshire, Neath Port Talbot, Pembrokeshire and City and County of Swansea, with the deal centred on the latter, the Swansea Bay City Deal was agreed between the local authorities, UK Government and Welsh Government on 20 March 2017. The deal includes £1.3 billion in funding, with almost half (£637 million) coming from the private sector. Other sources of the fund are from the UK and Welsh Governments (£241 million) and other public sector organisations (£396 million). The deal is focused on projects relating to the Internet and the city region styled as the "Internet Coast".

=== Growth deals ===
Growth deals are structured very similarly to city deals, with a similar transfer of powers and responsibility. Growth deals, unlike city deals, are not centred on a city and its city region, As a result of being less geographically restrictive, growth deals are allowed to cover larger areas that lack a predominant economic centre and/or city.

==== North Wales Growth Deal ====
Covering the local authorities of Conwy County Borough, Denbighshire, Flintshire, Gwynedd, Isle of Anglesey and Wrexham County Borough, the North Wales Growth Deal was signed on 17 December 2020. Unlike the city regions in South Wales, North Wales lacks a definitive main economic and urban centre, with settlements such as Llandudno, Deeside, Holyhead and Wrexham all having roles in the regional economy. The deal involves £240 million committed by the UK and Welsh Governments (£120 million each), with the remaining £760 million from other partners and the private sector, totalling the deal to be worth £1 billion. This funding was committed on 4 November 2019, with the deal itself signed on 17 December 2020.

The deal is led by the North Wales Economic Ambition Board, with representatives from the six principal councils of North Wales, Bangor University, Wrexham Glyndŵr University, Grŵp Llandrillo Menai, Coleg Cambria, and various private sector representatives.

==== Mid Wales Growth Deal ====
Covering the local authorities of Ceredigion and Powys, the Mid Wales Growth Deal was signed on 13 January 2022. The deal covers largely rural and sparsely populated mountainous landscapes of central Wales, with Aberystwyth, Newtown and Welshpool being the economic region's primary centres. The deal involves £110 million committed by the UK and Welsh Governments (£55 million each), with the funding focused on the digital, tourism, agricultural, food and drink, research and innovation sectors.

== Associated bodies ==
Each city and growth deal has equivalent bodies to assist in their roles for the regional economy.

There are three Regional Skills Partnerships for the four deals, with the Swansea Bay City Deal and Mid Wales Growth Deal forming a combined Regional Skills Partnership.

The Regional Skills Partnerships are:

- North Wales Regional Skills Partnership – described as the "workstream" of the North Wales Economic Ambition Board
- South West and Mid Wales Regional Learning and Skills Partnership – linked to the Swansea Bay City Deal and provides support to the Growing Mid Wales Partnership
- Cardiff Capital Region Skills Partnership – legally separate from the Employment and Skills Board of the Cardiff Capital Region City Deal, however, both boards share the same membership

== See also ==
- Corporate joint committee
- Economy of Wales
- Economy of Cardiff
