= Ambition North Wales =

Economic partnership in Wales

- Uchelgais Gogledd Cymru (Welsh)
- Logo

- A map showing the principal areas of North Wales
- Type: Regional economic partnership and growth deal governance body
- Headquarters: Llandudno Junction
- Location: Wales, United Kingdom
- Region served: North Wales: Conwy County Borough; Denbighshire; Flintshire; Gwynedd (lead); Isle of Anglesey; Wrexham County Borough
- Main organ: Portfolio Management Office
- Parent organization: North Wales Corporate Joint Committee
- Subsidiaries: Transport Sub-board
- Funding: Local authorities
- Website: ambitionnorth.wales
- Formerly called: North Wales Economic Ambition Board; Bwrdd Uchelgais Economaidd Gogledd Cymru (Welsh)

Ambition North Wales (Welsh: Uchelgais Gogledd Cymru) is an economic partnership overseeing the North Wales Growth Deal (Welsh: Bargen Twf Gogledd Cymru or Bargen Twf y Gogledd), a regional economic growth deal covering the North Wales region.

It was first a partnership between the six local authorities of Conwy County Borough, Denbighshire, Flintshire, Gwynedd, Isle of Anglesey, and Wrexham County Borough, and other local partners in the region, including Bangor University, Wrexham University, Grŵp Llandrillo Menai, Coleg Cambria, and various private sector representatives. Until it was absorbed into the North Wales Corporate Joint Committee in 2021, as a sub-committee of it.

The North Wales Growth Deal was signed on 17 December 2020, spanning 15 years. Unlike the city regions in South Wales, North Wales lacks a definitive main economic and urban centre, with settlements such as Bangor, Llandudno, Deeside, Holyhead and Wrexham all having roles in the regional economy. The deal involves £240 million committed by the UK and Welsh Governments (£120 million each), with the remaining £906 million from other partners in the public and private sector, totalling the deal to be worth £1.1 billion. This funding was committed on 4 November 2019, with the deal itself signed on 17 December 2020.

== Governance ==
Ambition North Wales is the sponsoring group and the decision-making local government body for the North Wales Growth Deal. Ambition North Wales considers and approves project business cases, and is responsible for the delivery of growth deal programmes and project boards, in line with the deal's aims and objectives. The board also was responsible for securing government funding for the growth deal during its bidding process. The board's Portfolio Management Office (PMO) is based in the Conwy Business Centre, in Llandudno Junction, Conwy County Borough.

Ambition North Wales is composed of the six principal council leaders and chief executives, representatives from two further and two higher education (university) institutions and the Business Delivery Board, representing the private sector. Meetings of the board take place monthly. Gwynedd Council is the host authority, responsible for holding the meetings, and managing financial statements for the board. Councillor Dyfrig Siencyn, leader of Gwynedd Council was the initial chair of the board, and Councillor Mark Pritchard, leader of Wrexham County Borough Council as Vice-chair. Voting rights of the board are only reserved for council leaders. These passed to the North Wales Corporate Joint Committee when it was later established. Alwen Williams is the Chief Executive as of 2026.

An Executive Support Group (or Portfolio Board) was established to act as an advisory body to the board and is composed of senior officers of the partner organisations in the partnership to assist in the development and delivery of the deal's various projects.

In December 2021, it was agreed that the functions of Ambition North Wales, which were at the time carried out by joint committee known as the North Wales Economic Ambition Board, would be absorbed into the newly formed North Wales Corporate Joint Committee, with a subcommittee being formed to carry out the statutory functions of an Economic Ambition Board.

== History ==
Ambition North Wales published the "Growth Vision for the Economy of North Wales" in September 2016, setting out the regional plan for improving infrastructure, skills, employment, business growth and innovation. The vision was subsequently adopted by all six councils of the committee.

In the March 2017 UK budget, the UK Government announced it was looking forward to proposals for a North Wales Growth Deal.

In November 2018, in the 2018 Autumn Budget, UK Chancellor of the Exchequer, Philip Hammond, announced the UK Government's commitment of £120 million towards a North Wales Growth Deal. In December 2018, Ken Skates confirmed that the Welsh Government would match the UK Government funding, and also offered to match any additional funding support which the UK Government might make available. In November 2019, the Heads of Terms Agreement for the North Wales Growth Deal was signed by the representatives of the North Wales Economic Ambition Board, Secretary of State for Wales, Alun Cairns, and Eluned Morgan, Baroness Morgan of Ely on behalf of Welsh Government. The deal was signed on 17 December 2020.

=== Growth deal ===
The North Wales Growth Deal (Welsh: Bargen Twf Gogledd Cymru or Bargen Twf y Gogledd) involves £240 million committed by the UK and Welsh Governments (£120 million each), with the remaining funding provided from other partners in the public (£184.3 million) and private sectors (£722.1 million), totalling the deal to be worth £1.1 billion over 15 years. The partnership describes the aims of the deal to be; building a more vibrant, sustainable and resilient economy, boosting productivity and other strengths to tackle long-term issues, and to promote scalable, inclusive and sustainable economic growth. Its objectives were set by the board to be: creating 3,400 - 4,200 jobs and generating between £2 billion and £2.5 billion in additional Gross value added (GVA) by 2036.

The deal is organised into five programmes, focusing on a particular sector of the North Wales economy, the programmes being;

- Low Carbon Energy
- Digital
- Agrifood & Tourism
- Innovation in High-Value Manufacturing
- Land & Property

=== Post-signing projects ===
The first project under the growth deal to be approved was the £3 million investment into new equipment in the Digital Signal Processing Centre (DSP) at Bangor University, and the first project to commence was the £35 million Morlais renewable energy scheme.

In June 2025, it was reported that the deal was connected to only creating "35 jobs", compared to its target of 4,200 jobs.

== Partners and associated bodies ==
The partnership is composed of the following members:

- Conwy County Borough Council
- Denbighshire County Council
- Flintshire County Council
- Gwynedd Council
- Isle of Anglesey County Council
- Wrexham County Borough Council
- Bangor University
- Wrexham University
- Coleg Cambria
- Grŵp Llandrillo Menai

A Portfolio Management Office was established by the partnership to initially develop and deliver the Growth Vision plan and later the Growth Deal plan. Following the growth deal's signing, its present role is to support the delivery of the aims set in the growth deal, by identifying gaps in the skills, knowledge or capacity of the local workforce.

Outside the growth deal, the partnership works with two other advisory bodies:

- North Wales Regional Skills Partnership — oversees a Skills and Employment Programme in North Wales to develop the skill base of the region to be more dynamic and agile, and to close the skills gap, by matching the skills required by employers to be developed in the workforce.
- Business Delivery Board — represents employers and the business sector in the region

Sub-boards:

- Transport Sub-board — established by the partnership to support transport investment initiatives in the region, the sub-board co-operates with Transport for Wales and the Welsh Government in their North Wales Metro project.

Two principal councils, Flintshire and Wrexham, are part of the Mersey Dee Alliance, which the board also works with.

== See also ==
- North Wales
- Growth deal
- Regional economy in Wales
- North Wales Corporate Joint Committee
