= Brookings list of metropolitan economies in the United Kingdom =

This Brookings list of metropolitan economies in the United Kingdom was compiled by the Brookings Institution in Washington, D.C. and based upon the UK metropolitan areas as defined by the ESPON project of the European Union, which in turn is based on the 2001 Census. The ESPON database is the most consistent with United States definitions of metropolitan areas.

A metropolitan economy is the economy of a metropolitan area, made up of one or more cities and the surrounding suburban and rural areas to which they are closely economically tied through commuting. These areas therefore reflect a city's actual economic footprint, unconstrained by the artificial political barriers of city boundaries.

== List of metropolitan economies by size ==
Metropolitan area	GDP (2012, $bn, PPP)	Population (2012)	GDP per capita (2012, $)	GDP per capita change (2011–2012, %)	Employment (2012)	Employment change (2011–2012, %)
London	731.2	14,066,992	51,978	-1.0	7,889,910	+1.8
Birmingham	114.3	3,701,107	30,896	-1.1	1,698,066	+0.6
Manchester	88.3	2,568,711	34,385	-1.0	1,277,921	+0.8
Leeds-Bradford	69.8	2,262,749	30,833	-1.5	1,059,414	+0.7
Liverpool	57.3	2,017,132	28,414	-1.0	904,822	+0.4
Glasgow	55.5	1,459,513	38,027	-0.6	782,821	+0.8
Nottingham-Derby	50.6	1,572,501	32,170	-0.7	773,369	+1.2
Portsmouth-Southampton	50.0	1,349,259	37,088	-0.5	686,059	+1.8
Bristol	46.2	1,140,064	40,561	-0.8	606,804	+1.3
Newcastle-Sunderland	44.4	1,495,557	29,703	-1.2	656,818	+0.3
Sheffield	38.8	1,481,830	26,157	-1.1	645,559	+0.9
Cardiff-Newport	35.2	1,190,835	29,527	-1.4	522,726	+0.3
Edinburgh	33.1	558,243	59,332	-1.5	365,628	+0.9
Leicester	27.5	795,920	34,535	-1.0	414,918	+1.3
Brighton	20.6	596,735	34,483	-0.3	306,661	+1.9

== List of metropolitan economies by industry sector ==
Metropolitan area	GDP (2012, $bn, PPP)	Commodities (%)	Commodities ($bn)	Construction (%)	Construction ($bn)	Business and Finance (%)	Business and Finance ($bn)	Manufacturing (%)	Manufacturing ($bn)	Local and non market (%)	Local and non market ($bn)	Trade and Tourism (%)	Trade and Tourism ($bn)	Transportation (%)	Transportation ($bn)	Utilities (%)	Utilities ($bn)
London	731.2	6.9	50.5	4.9	35.8	47.8	349.5	5.5	40.2	15.2	111.1	12.1	88.5	6.9	50.5	0.8	5.8
Birmingham	114.3	5.0	5.7	6.4	7.3	29.7	33.9	13.5	15.4	20.6	23.5	15.7	17.9	6.3	7.2	2.7	3.1
Manchester	88.3	4.7	4.2	5.6	4.9	35.0	30.9	12.5	11.0	18.5	16.3	14.2	12.5	7.0	6.2	2.5	2.2
Leeds-Bradford	69.8	4.8	3.4	5.8	4.0	29.5	20.6	15.7	11.0	20.6	14.4	14.8	10.3	6.0	4.2	2.8	2.0
Liverpool	57.3	5.0	2.9	5.7	3.3	28.4	16.3	14.7	8.4	23.0	13.2	14.6	8.4	7.3	4.2	1.3	0.7
Glasgow	55.5	4.4	2.4	5.8	3.2	36.2	20.1	9.7	5.4	22.0	12.2	12.3	6.8	7.5	4.2	2.2	1.2
Nottingham-Derby	50.6	6.0	3.0	7.8	3.9	25.8	13.1	17.2	8.7	19.8	10.0	14.4	7.3	5.8	2.9	3.2	1.6
Portsmouth-Southampton	50.0	5.1	2.6	6.3	3.2	35.3	17.7	10.7	5.4	19.1	9.6	15.0	7.5	6.9	3.5	1.7	0.9
Bristol	46.2	4.7	2.2	6.2	2.9	36.6	16.9	9.3	4.3	20.5	9.5	13.8	6.4	7.2	3.3	1.6	0.7
Newcastle	44.4	4.9	2.2	6.9	3.1	27.3	12.1	15.0	6.7	24.5	10.9	12.4	5.5	6.6	2.9	2.5	1.1
Sheffield	38.8	5.1	2.0	7.8	3.0	24.6	9.5	14.8	5.7	24.3	9.4	14.8	5.7	7.5	2.9	0.9	0.3
Cardiff-Newport	35.2	5.7	2.0	5.8	2.0	28.0	9.9	13.9	4.9	25.5	9.0	13.3	4.7	5.5	1.9	2.3	0.8
Edinburgh	33.1	4.7	1.6	3.4	1.1	47.8	15.8	4.6	1.5	20.4	6.8	11.2	3.7	5.7	1.9	2.2	0.7
Leicester	27.5	5.6	1.5	6.5	1.8	25.5	7.0	16.4	4.5	18.9	5.2	14.8	4.1	7.0	1.9	5.1	1.4
Brighton	20.6	6.2	1.3	5.6	1.2	32.9	6.8	6.7	1.4	21.5	4.4	15.4	3.2	9.1	1.9	2.7	0.6

=== Industry sectors ===
- Commodities: Agriculture, Forestry, Fishing, Hunting, Mining, Quarrying, Oil and Gas Extraction
- Manufacturing: Manufacturing
- Utilities: Utilities
- Construction: Construction
- Trade and tourism: Wholesale Trade, Retail Trade, Accommodation and Food Services
- Business and Finance: Finance and Insurance; Real Estate; Rental and Leasing; Professional, Scientific and Technical Services; Management of Companies and Enterprises
- Local/non-market services: Administrative, Support, Waste Management and Remediation Services; Educational Services; Health Care and Social Assistance; Arts, Entertainment, and Recreation; Government; Information

== See also ==
- List of metropolitan areas in the United Kingdom
- Local enterprise partnerships

== Bibliography ==
- Istrate, Emilia; Nadeau, Carey Anne (2012), Global MetroMonitor 2012: Slowdown, Recovery, and Interdependence (PDF), The Brookings Institution
