= 2017 United Kingdom budget =

2017 United Kingdom budget may refer to:

- March 2017 United Kingdom budget
- November 2017 United Kingdom budget
