= Cardiff Capital Region =

Cardiff Capital Region Prifddinas Ranbarth Caerdydd
- City region
- Logo

- A map showing the location of the Cardiff Capital Region in Wales
- Sovereign state: United Kingdom
- Constituent country: Wales
- Ratification of City Deal: 1 March 2017
- Named after: Capital of Wales (Cardiff)
- Principal areas: List: Blaenau Gwent; Bridgend County Borough; Caerphilly County Borough; Cardiff; Merthyr Tydfil County Borough; Monmouthshire; Newport; Rhondda Cynon Taf; Torfaen (lead); Vale of Glamorgan

Government
  - Type: Regional cabinet
  - Body: Cardiff Capital Region Cabinet
  - Chair of Regional Cabinet: Cllr Anthony Hunt (Labour)

Area
  - Total: 1,085 sq mi (2,809 km^{2})

Population
  - Estimate (2019): 1,543,293
- Website: cardiffcapitalregion.wales

The Cardiff Capital Region (CCR; Welsh: Prifddinas-Ranbarth Caerdydd) is a city region in Wales, centred on the capital city of Wales, Cardiff, in the southeast of the country. It is a partnership between the ten local authorities of Blaenau Gwent, Bridgend, Caerphilly, Cardiff, Merthyr Tydfil, Monmouthshire, Newport, Rhondda Cynon Taf, Torfaen, and the Vale of Glamorgan, local businesses in southeast Wales and other organisations. The regional city deal is funded by the UK Government and Welsh Government. The Cardiff Capital Region includes the cities of Cardiff and Newport, and most of the South Wales Valleys, with the region being coterminous with the area defined as South East Wales.

== Principal areas ==
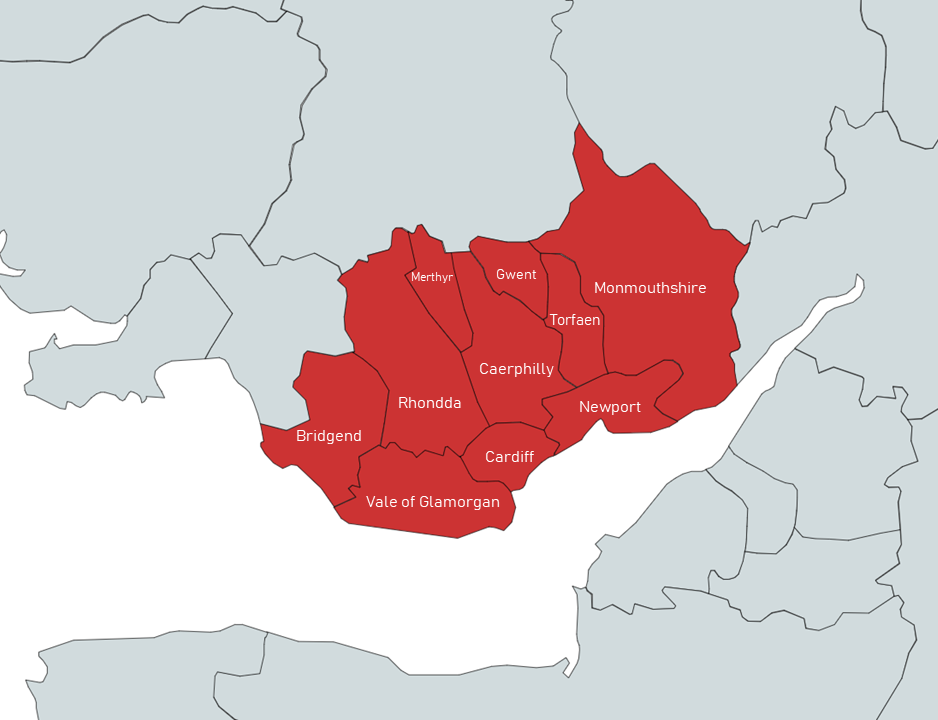
Principal areas of the CCR

The Cardiff Capital Region covers the principal areas of Blaenau Gwent, Bridgend County Borough, Caerphilly County Borough, Cardiff, Merthyr Tydfil County Borough, Monmouthshire, Newport, Rhondda Cynon Taf, Torfaen, and the Vale of Glamorgan.

A large part of the Cardiff Capital Region also includes the Cardiff-Newport Metropolitan Area, which covers the immediate urban areas between the two cities and some outlying towns and villages in neighbouring county boroughs. This does not include Monmouthshire, Torfaen, or the Vale of Glamorgan due to their more established rural settings.

== History ==
The Cardiff Capital Region Board was established in November 2013, by the Welsh Government Minister for Economy, Science and Transport.

=== City deal ===
Leader of Cardiff Council, Phil Bale, called for a "city deal" to boost Cardiff's and the local region's transport services in November 2014. Bale said that "Cardiff must be treated the same as the other big cities" and that a city deal would increase investment in Cardiff and deliver benefits for the wider Welsh economy. Talks of a £1 billion city deal began in April 2015 by Cardiff Council.

In the spring 2015 UK Budget, the UK treasury announced that the UK Government is opening negotiations for a Cardiff city deal with the Welsh Government and local partners, with funding being made available for the deal by the UK Government in 2015–16.

In July 2015, the ten local councils backed the campaign of a Cardiff city deal. All councils announced their commitment to a £500,000 fund to develop a city deal proposal. Secretary of State for Wales Stephen Crabb urged local councils to support the proposal, calling the opportunity a "once in a generation".

The regional partnership was formed through the passing of the Cardiff Capital Region City Deal, lasting between 2016 and 2025. It was signed in Cardiff on 15 March 2016 by the Secretary of State for Wales Stephen Crabb, Chief Secretary to the Treasury Greg Hands, local council leaders, and the Welsh Government. First Minister of Wales, Carwyn Jones said the deal was a "vote of confidence in the region", and was a "fantastic" deal handing "real power to local decision makers". The CCR city deal is shorter than other city deals which typically last thirty years. Supporters of the city deal hope that the shorter timeframe encourages funding to be delivered to the region faster.

It was ratified on 1 March 2017, and every five years the deal undergoes a gateway review where the local authorities can decide to opt-out if they desire to. Carwyn Jones said following ratification "I’m delighted that the landmark £1.2bn Cardiff Capital Region City Deal has been formally ratified.".

£1.1 billion has been committed to the City Deal, by both the Welsh Government and UK Government, with an additional £120m committed from the 10 local authorities through the CCR City Deal Wider Investment Fund, totalling to £1.2 billion for the entire city deal. The deal aims to create up to 25,000 new jobs (including 10,000 new apprenticeships) in the region, and an additional £4 billion in private sector investment.

The deal aims to boost economic growth through improved transport connections, increasing skills, assisting the unemployed into employment, and providing business support to growing businesses. The deal establishes the Cardiff Capital Region Cabinet, composed of leaders of each of the ten local authorities, to make decisions, pool the resources of the region together, and partner with local businesses.

The city deal is composed of various initiatives including:

- £1.2 billion investment into the region's infrastructure through a 20-year investment fund. Mainly through the South Wales Metro project and the included Valley Lines electrification programme.
- Creating a non-statutory Regional Transport Authority, partnering with the Welsh Government, to coordinate regional transport planning and investment.
- To develop and improve the capabilities of the Compound Semiconductor Applications industry in the region, with the UK Government to invest £50 million through establishing a "Catapult Centre". The deal aims to prioritise investment in research and development, and support high value and innovative businesses.
- Creation of the Cardiff Capital Region Skills and Employment Board to ensure skills and employment provision incorporates the needs of local businesses and communities.
- Co-design a support system for future employment from 2017, for individuals with a health condition, disability and/or otherwise long term unemployment, with the Welsh Government and Department for Work and Pensions.
- Create a Cardiff Capital Region Business Organisation to provide the business sector with a voice towards local authority leaders.
- Create a new partnership approach to housing development and regeneration, through the delivery of sustainable communities by the use and re-use of property and sites, with the Welsh Government.

=== Present ===
In August 2020, a £45 million fund was launched by the City Deal aiming to deliver 2,800 new homes across the region.

In April 2021, a planned £100 million innovation investment fund was announced. The fund is centred on job creation and business expansion in the region, in addition to attracting inward investment. The fund is in its early stages and may be partially funded (up to £45 million) from the City Deal.

In May 2021, funding for the next five years of the Cardiff Capital Region City Deal were approved following the conclusion of a gateway review, which occur every five years during the deal's operation.

== Economy ==
The region is the economically significant to the Welsh economy, accounting for 50% of the total economic output of Wales, and 49% of its total employed workforce population, with a recorded 38,000 active businesses. CCR is a centre of various industries such as: advanced manufacturing, creative and digital industries, energy and energy supply, financial services, and life sciences.

In April 2021, a Cardiff University lead partnership initiative, Clwstwr, assessed the economic impact of the media sector in the region. It reported that the CCR is home to the third largest media sector in the United Kingdom, after London and Manchester, and ahead of other media hubs such as Brighton, Bristol, and Southampton. One in every eight jobs created today in the region is linked to the media sector, with the report stating that targeted funding and productivity incentives can potentially make the region a "global hub for media production". 1,318 firms were stated by the report to be present in the region, with BBC Cymru Wales taking a big share (47%) of the economic contributions from the sector.

== Governance ==
The Capital Region is overseen by a regional cabinet, consisting of a councillor from each of the ten local authorities. It is currently headed by leader of Torfaen Council, Councillor Anthony Hunt. In April 2021, a South East Wales Corporate Joint Committee was formed to allow the ten local councils in the region to collaborate in areas relating to economic well-being, strategic planning and the development of regional transport policies.

== Education ==
The region is home to three universities, Cardiff University, Cardiff Metropolitan University, and the University of South Wales as well as the Royal Welsh College of Music and Drama.

== Transport ==
The region contains one airport, Cardiff Airport.

=== Metro ===
The South Wales Metro (sometimes called the Cardiff Capital Region Metro) is an integrated public transport network centred in the region, with the aim of making the region better connected, through improved rail and bus services. The project involves new rolling stock, electrifying around 170 km (110 mi) of railways, building new stations, upgrading stations and the associated signalling, and upgrading the Core Valley Lines to Aberdare, Coryton, Merthyr Tydfil, Rhymney and Treherbert. Funding comes from a ring-fenced contribution of £734m from the CCR City Deal, with sources from the Welsh Government (£500m), UK Government (£125m) and European Regional Development Fund (£94m). The project is being managed by Transport for Wales and contracted companies.

== Tidal power ==
In October 2021, a commission of councils of the CRR, in collaboration with the Western Gateway (a regional group of councils in England and Wales), looked into plans for a barrage or lagoon across the Severn estuary for tidal power.

== See also ==
- Cardiff–Newport metropolitan area
- Swansea Bay City Region
