= City Deal =

UK economic initiative

City Deals are an initiative enacted by the UK government in 2012 to promote economic growth and infrastructure while ultimately shifting control of decisions away from the central government to local authorities. City Deals are generally set for ten year plans and have been enacted across several cities within the United Kingdom.

In 2016 the Cities and Local Government Devolution Act was enacted to give a firmer statutory footing for City Deals in England. The preparation of the bill was led by the Communities and Local Government Committee which also examined the lessons that could be learned from City Deals arranged in 2012-14. The Act provided for a more open and transparent process for deals, including public consultation before implementation, and formed the basis for devolution deals between the government and any local authority or group of contiguous local authorities. City Deals agreed in the first two waves of the process after the approval of the Act are listed below.

In Scotland, the UK Government and Scottish Government launched a programme of City Region Deals in 2014. Instead of being devolution deals, Scottish Deals are capital investment programmes agreed with regional local authorities, focusing on economic development and inclusive growth. They are overseen by the Scottish City Region and Growth Deal Delivery Board. In 2024, City Region Deals were announced for every part of Scotland. The UK government investment for the Deals was approximately £1.5 billion, while the Scottish Government investments totalled more than £1.9 billion.

In Northern Ireland, a programme of City and Growth Deals was launched in 2021 with the Belfast City Region Deal. The four deals have a combined funding of £1.2 billion from the Northern Ireland Executive and UK government.

In March 2017, the Australian Government announced it would begin modeling City Deals after UK models.

== English City Deals ==
=== 'Wave 1' City Deals ===
- Greater Birmingham and Solihull
- Bristol and the West of England
- Greater Manchester
- Leeds
- Liverpool
- Nottingham
- Newcastle
- Sheffield

=== 'Wave 2' City Deals ===
- Black Country
- Greater Brighton
- Greater Cambridge
- Coventry and Warwickshire
- Hull & Humber
- Greater Ipswich
- Leicester and Leicestershire
- Greater Norwich (covering Norwich, South Norfolk and Breckland)
- Oxford and Oxfordshire
- Plymouth and the South West Peninsula
- Preston, South Ribble and Lancashire
- Southampton and Portsmouth
- Southend-on-Sea
- Stoke-on-Trent and Staffordshire
- Sunderland and South Tyneside
- Swindon and Wiltshire
- Tees Valley
- Thames Valley Berkshire

== Scottish City Region Deals ==
- Glasgow City Region
- Aberdeen and Aberdeenshire
- Inverness and Highlands
- Edinburgh and South East Scotland
- Stirling and Clackmannanshire
- Tay Cities
- Ayrshire
- Borderlands
- Moray
- Argyll and Bute
- Falkirk
- Islands

== Welsh City Deals ==
- Cardiff Capital Region
- Swansea Bay City Region

== Northern Irish City and Growth Deals ==
- Belfast
- Derry and Strabane
- Mid South West
- Causeway Coast and Glens

== See also ==
- Growth deal
- Economy of the United Kingdom
- Northern Powerhouse
