= City region (United Kingdom) =

A city region in the United Kingdom may refer to:

- Combined authorities in England, some styled as "city regions"
- Glasgow City Region, a geographic area of Scotland
- Greater Brighton City Region, an area in the south of England
- Leeds City Region, a local enterprise partnership in West Yorkshire
- Liverpool City Region, a combined authority area in North West England
- Local enterprise partnerships in England, some styled as "city regions"
- Regional economic boards in Wales, some styled as "city regions"

== See also ==
- Planning etc. (Scotland) Act 2006, an Act of the Scottish Parliament to develop plans for four Scottish city regions
