= ESPON metropolitan areas in the United Kingdom =

The 20 largest ESPON metropolitan areas in the UK, ranked by population.

A 2001 ESPON metropolitan area was defined as consisting of an urban area, conurbation or agglomeration, together with the surrounding area to which it was closely economically and socially integrated through commuting.

The European Union's ESPON (European Spatial Planning Observation Network) project defined a harmonised series of metropolitan areas across Europe, made up of two components: Morphological Urban Areas (MUAs), which were similar to urban areas that form the densely populated urban cores of metropolitan areas, and Functional Urban Areas (FUAs), which form the labour basin surrounding Morphological Urban Areas.

Morphological Urban Areas were calculated by combining contiguous local administrative units with population densities greater than 650 inhabitants per square kilometre, with Functional Urban Areas then being calculated by combining surrounding local administrative units where 10% or more of the workforce works within the core Morphological Urban Area.

According to the harmonised European definition, there were eighteen metropolitan areas in the United Kingdom with populations of more than 500,000 at the time of the 2001 census.

This article lists the UK metropolitan areas defined by ESPON, which excluded combined conurbations such as the Liverpool-Manchester megalopolis, which (in 2001) had a combined population of 5.6 million. It also excluded city regions such as those formed in Greater Manchester, Leeds, Liverpool and Sheffield, which are typically areas now covered by combined authorities.

== Summary ==
In 2001, there were 46 metropolitan areas in the United Kingdom with a populations in the range 150,000 to 25 million inhabitants, according to the ESPON project, with the following population distribution:

Category	Populations (2011)	Count
A	12.8 – 25 million	1
B	6.4 – 12.8 million	0
C	3.2 – 6.4 million	1
D	1.6 – 3.2 million	3
E	0.8 – 1.6 million	7
F	0.4 – 0.8 million	9
Gi	0.2 – 0.4 million	19
Gii	<0.2 million	~6
Total		46

== By population (2001 data) ==
#	Area (population)	Parts (population)
1	London (13,709,000)	London (8,265,000) • Southend (291,000) • Chatham (231,000) • Luton–Dunstable (216,000) • Reading (216,000) • Aldershot–Farnborough (174,000) • Woking (124,000) • Basildon (113,000) • Slough (112,000) • High Wycombe (100,000) • Crawley (99,000) • Bracknell–Ascot (96,000) • Harlow (87,000) • Chelmsford (76,000) • Hemel Hempstead (68,000) • Maidstone (65,000) • Maidenhead (59,000) • St. Albans (59,000) • Basingstoke (55,000) • Aylesbury (49,000) • Stevenage (49,000) • Sittingbourne (42,000) • Wokingham (42,000) • Tunbridge Wells (39,000) • Sandhurst–Yateley (37,000) • Guildford (34,000) • Windsor (33,000) • Bishop's Stortford (31,000) • Letchworth (28,000) • Horsham (27,000) • East Grinstead (26,000) • Burgess Hill (24,000) • Sevenoaks (24,000) • Haywards Heath (22,000) • Hitchin (21,000) • Tonbridge (20,000)
2	Birmingham (3,683,000)	Birmingham–Wolverhampton (2,363,000) • Coventry (308,000) • Nuneaton (87,000) • Warwick–Leamington (71,000) • Redditch (61,000) • Bromsgrove (25,000) • Tamworth (21,000)
3	Manchester (2,556,000)	Greater Manchester Urban Area (2,207,000) • Macclesfield (59,000)
4	Leeds–Bradford (2,302,000)	Leeds (534,000) • Bradford (341,000) • Huddersfield (219,000) • Halifax–Queensbury (155,000) • Wakefield (111,000) • Castleford–Pontefract (102,000) • Harrogate (60,000) • Dewsbury (36,000)
5	Liverpool–Birkenhead (2,241,000)	Liverpool–Birkenhead (1,170,000) • Wigan–Ashton (220,000) • Warrington (168,000) • Widnes–Runcorn (121,000) • Chester (58,000) • Southport (44,000) • Ellesmere Port (40,000) • Ormskirk (24,000) • Skelmersdale (20,000)
6	Newcastle–Sunderland (1,599,000)	Newcastle (814,000) • Sunderland (270,000) • Blyth–Cramlington (55,000) • Peterlee (42,000) • Ashington (27,000) • Seaham (24,000) • Chester-le-Street (23,000)
7	Sheffield (1,569,000)	Sheffield (693,000) • Rotherham (150,000) • Doncaster (80,000) • Darfield (73,000) • Chesterfield (73,000) • Barnsley (56,000)
8	Portsmouth–Southampton (1,547,000)	Portsmouth (500,000) • Southampton (376,000) • Bognor Regis (66,000) • Salisbury (29,000) • Winchester (27,000) • Andover (26,000)
9	Nottingham–Derby (1,534,000)	Nottingham (532,000) • Derby (217,000) • Mansfield (185,000) • Ilkeston (53,000) • Newark (25,000) • Alfreton (23,000)
10	Glasgow (1,395,000)	Greater Glasgow (1,228,000) • East Kilbride (59,000) • Cumbernauld (45,000) • Kilmarnock (39,000) • Dumbarton (23,000)
11	Cardiff and South Wales valleys (1,097,000)	Cardiff (353,000) • Newport (192,000) • Merthyr Tydfil (35,000) • Pontypridd (28,000) • Caerphilly (26,000) • Bridgend (24,000) • Ebbw Vale (22,000)
12	Bristol (1,041,000)	Bristol (568,000) • Weston-super-Mare (70,000) • Bath (65,000) • Clevedon (25,000)
13	Belfast (799,000)	Belfast (501,000) • Bangor (15,000)
14	Edinburgh (782,000)	Edinburgh (478,000) • Livingston (46,000)
15	Brighton–Worthing–Littlehampton (769,000)	Brighton–Worthing (410,000) • Eastbourne (74,000) • Littlehampton (40,000)
16	Leicester (745,000)	Leicester (442,000) • Loughborough (53,000) • Coalville (39,000) • Hinckley (20,000)
17	Middlesbrough (656,000)	Middlesbrough-Stockton (389,000) • Darlington (58,000) • Hartlepool (53,000)
18	Bournemouth–Poole (531,000)	Bournemouth–Poole (390,000)
19	Swansea (462,000)	Swansea (219,000) • Port Talbot–Neath (51,000)
20	Stoke (456,000)	Stoke-on-Trent (359,000)
21	Hull (419,000)	Hull (284,000)
22	Blackburn–Burnley (391,000)	Blackburn (182,000) • Burnley (125,000)
23	Norwich (364,000)	Norwich (193,000)
24	Preston (354,000)	Preston–Leyland (249,000)
25	Plymouth (343,000)	Plymouth (228,000)
26	Aberdeen (332,000)	Aberdeen (183,000)
27	Blackpool (304,000)	Blackpool (239,000)
28	Northampton (288,000)	Northampton (220,000)
29	Cambridge (283,000)	Cambridge (142,000)
30	Milton Keynes (271,000)	Milton Keynes (136,000)
31	Swindon (260,000)	Swindon (144,000)
32	Exeter (259,000)	Exeter (105,000) • Exmouth (25,000)
33	Oxford (244,000)	Oxford (122,000)
34	Ipswich (240,000)	Ipswich (120,000)
35	York (234,000)	York (135,000)
36	Torbay (231,000)	Torbay (178,000)
37	Peterborough (219,000)	Peterborough (127,000)
38	Dundee (211,000)	Dundee (150,000)
39	Telford (209,000)	Telford (105,000)
40	Bedford (202,000)	Bedford (108,000)
41	Colchester (191,000)	Colchester (95,000)
42	Lincoln (176,000)	Lincoln (99,000)
43	Grimsby (174,000)	Grimsby (123,000)
44	Gloucester (166,000)	Gloucester (134,000)
45	Hastings–Bexhill (164,000)	Hastings–Bexhill (103,000)
46	Cheltenham (164,000)	Cheltenham (82,000)

== By region (2001 data) ==
Region	Region population	Metro Rank	Metropolitan area	Metro Population (2001)
Greater London	8,173,941	1	London	13,709,000
West Midlands	5,601,847	2	Birmingham	3,683,000
West Midlands	5,601,847	20	Stoke	456,000
West Midlands	5,601,847	39	Telford	209,000
North West	7,052,177	3	Manchester	2,556,000
North West	7,052,177	5	Liverpool–Birkenhead	2,241,000
North West	7,052,177	22	Blackburn–Burnley	391,000
North West	7,052,177	24	Preston	354,000
North West	7,052,177	27	Blackpool	304,000
Yorkshire and the Humber	5,283,733	4	Leeds–Bradford	2,302,000
Yorkshire and the Humber	5,283,733	7	Sheffield	1,569,000
Yorkshire and the Humber	5,283,733	21	Hull	419,000
Yorkshire and the Humber	5,283,733	35	York	234,000
Yorkshire and the Humber	5,283,733	43	Grimsby	174,000
North East	2,596,886	6	Newcastle–Sunderland	1,599,000
North East	2,596,886	17	Middlesbrough	656,000
South East	8,634,750	8	Portsmouth–Southampton	1,547,000
South East	8,634,750	15	Brighton–Worthing–Littlehampton	769,000
South East	8,634,750	30	Milton Keynes	271,000
South East	8,634,750	33	Oxford	244,000
South East	8,634,750	45	Hastings–Bexhill	164,000
East Midlands	4,533,222	9	Nottingham–Derby	1,543,000
East Midlands	4,533,222	16	Leicester	745,000
East Midlands	4,533,222	28	Northampton	288,000
East Midlands	4,533,222	42	Lincoln	176,000
Wales		11	Cardiff and South Wales valleys	1,097,000
Wales		19	Swansea	462,000
South West	5,288,935	12	Bristol	1,041,000
South West	5,288,935	18	Bournemouth–Poole	531,000
South West	5,288,935	25	Plymouth	343,000
South West	5,288,935	31	Swindon	260,000
South West	5,288,935	32	Exeter	259,000
South West	5,288,935	36	Torbay	231,000
South West	5,288,935	44	Gloucester	166,000
South West	5,288,935	46	Cheltenham	164,000
East of England	5,846,965	23	Norwich	364,000
East of England	5,846,965	29	Cambridge	283,000
East of England	5,846,965	34	Ipswich	240,000
East of England	5,846,965	37	Peterborough	219,000
East of England	5,846,965	40	Bedford	202,000
East of England	5,846,965	41	Colchester	191,000
Scotland	5,404,700	10	Glasgow	1,395,000
Scotland	5,404,700	14	Edinburgh	782,000
Scotland	5,404,700	26	Aberdeen	332,000
Scotland	5,404,700	38	Dundee	211,000
Northern Ireland		13	Belfast	799,000

== See also ==
- List of metropolitan economies in the United Kingdom
- Core Cities Group
- Combined authority
- List of towns and cities in England by population
- List of urban areas in the United Kingdom
- Metropolitan and non-metropolitan counties of England
- Travel to work area
- List of metropolitan areas in Europe by population
- List of metropolitan areas by population for the world
- Larger urban zone
