= Growth deal =

Economic agreement between local and national governments

Growth deals provide funds from the Government of the United Kingdom to local enterprise partnerships, for projects that benefit the local area and economy. They are promoted by the Ministry of Housing, Communities and Local Government, Department for Business, Energy and Industrial Strategy, Cabinet Office, and Department for Transport. They are collaboratively funded by local government.

Regional growth deals in Scotland are administered by the Scottish Government. Whereas in Wales, they are administered by Corporate Joint Committees.

== History ==
In 2020, a growth deal for North Wales was signed. They are also active in the Black Country. In March 2021, a £450 million Growth Deal for the Borderlands was signed; affecting border counties of Cumbria and Northumberland.

== List ==
Area	Cost
Argyll and Bute	£70 million
Ayrshire	£148.5 million
Borderlands	£450 million
Falkirk	£90 million
Greater Manchester	£1 billion
North Wales	£240 million
Mid Wales	£110 million
Scottish Islands	£335 million

== See also ==
- City Deal
- Regional economy in Wales
- Devolution in the United Kingdom
- Economy of the United Kingdom
- Levelling up policy of the Boris Johnson government
- Local government in the United Kingdom
- Localism Act 2011
- Northern Powerhouse
