= Cardiff urban area =

Urban area around Cardiff, Wales

Coordinates: 51.470°N 3.173°W

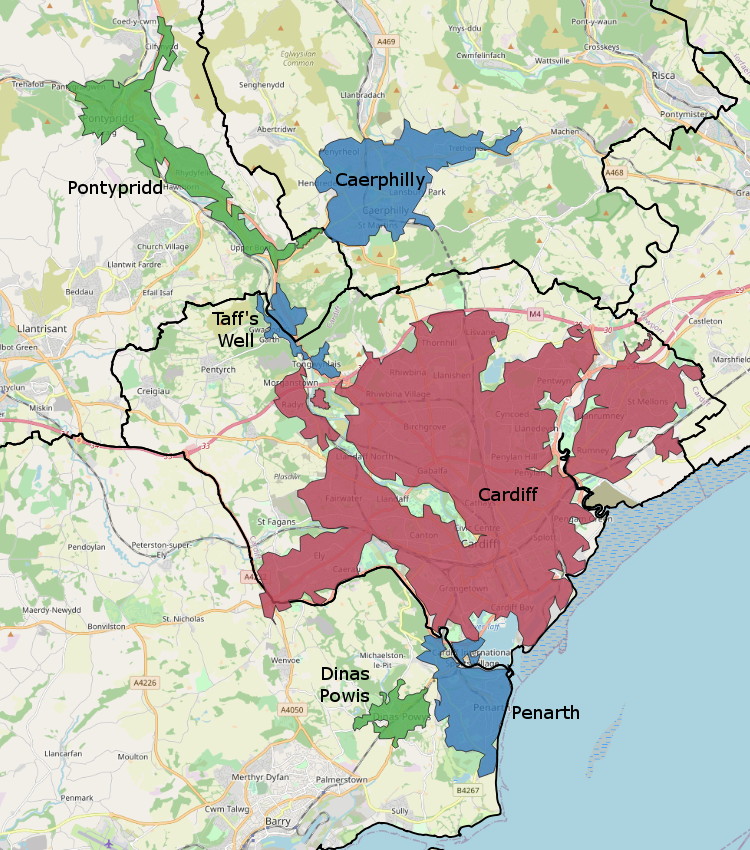
Map of the Cardiff Urban Area showing subdivisions and local authority boundaries

The Cardiff Built-up Area or Cardiff Urban Area is the name given to the urban area around Cardiff. The vast bulk of the population and area are contributed by Cardiff, which had a population of 335,145 at the 2011 census. The rest was made up by the towns of Penarth and Dinas Powys, connected to the south-west of the city along Cardiff Bay; as well as the South Wales Valleys towns of Caerphilly and Pontypridd. The total official population of this urban area was given to be 447,287 in 2011. This was an increase of almost 37% on the 2001 population of 327,706. This was mainly due to Caerphilly and Pontypridd becoming part of the built-up area. The population of the Cardiff unitary authority (not co-terminous with the built-up area or the wider urban area) in 2001 was 305,353. Cardiff Council estimated the population of the unitary authority at 317,500 in 2006; at the 2011 census it was 346,090.

== Subdivisions ==
According to the ONS definition the Cardiff Urban Area had the following subdivisions:

Rank	Urban sub-area	Population	
Rank	Urban sub-area	2001 census	2011 census
1	Cardiff	292,150	335,145
2	Caerphilly		41,402
3	Pontypridd		30,457
4	Penarth	23,245	27,226
5	Dinas Powys	7,653	7,490
6	Taff's Well		5,567
	Radyr	4,658	
Total		327,206	447,287

Notes:

- Radyr was included in the Cardiff subdivision in the 2011 census.
- Pontypridd, Caerphilly and Taff's Well were separate urban areas in the 2001 census.
