= March 2015 United Kingdom budget =

2015 March United Kingdom budget
- Presented: Wednesday 18 March 2015
- Country: United Kingdom
- Parliament: 55th
- Party: Coalition government
- Chancellor: George Osborne
- Total revenue: £667 billion ($988 billion)
- Total expenditures: £743 billion ($1.104 trillion)
- Deficit: £76 billion ($113 billion, 4% of 2015 GDP)
- Website: Budget 2015 documents

The 2015 United Kingdom budget was delivered by George Osborne, the Chancellor of the Exchequer, to the House of Commons on Wednesday, 18 March 2015.

It was the sixth and final budget of the Conservative–Liberal Democrat coalition government formed following the 2010 general election, and also the sixth to be delivered by Osborne.

Following the UK general election a second 2015 budget to be presented by Chancellor George Osborne was announced for 8 July 2015.

== Taxes ==
Receipts	2015-16 Revenues (£bn)
Income Tax	170
National Insurance	113
Value Added Tax (VAT)	131
Corporate Tax	42
Excise duties	47
Council Tax	28
Business rates	28
Other	107
Total Government revenue	667

== Spending ==
Department	2015-16 Expenditure (£bn)
Social protection	232
Health	141
Education	99
Debt interest	35
Defence	45
Public order and safety	34
Personal social services	30
Housing and Environment	28
Transport	29
Industry, agriculture and employment	24
Other	48
Total Government spending	743

== Supply-side reform ==
Supply-side measures included digital infrastructure investment, transport, energy and environment and the sharing economy.
