= Metropolitan area =

Dense urban core together with its satellite cities

A metropolitan area or metro is a region consisting of a densely populated urban agglomeration and its surrounding territories; which share industries, commercial areas, transport network, infrastructure and housing. A metropolitan area usually comprises multiple principal cities, jurisdictions and municipalities: neighborhoods, townships, boroughs, cities, towns, exurbs, suburbs, counties, districts and even states and nations in areas like the eurodistricts. As social, economic and political institutions have changed, metropolitan areas have become key economic and political regions.

== Definition ==
A metropolitan area usually includes a main city and a series of smaller satellite cities as can be seen in this map of Madrid's metropolitan area (click on the map to enlarge it).

A metropolitan area combines an urban agglomeration with the contiguous built-up areas, which are not necessarily urban in character but are closely bound to the center by employment or other commerce. These outlying zones are sometimes known as a commuter belt and may extend well beyond the urban zone to other political entities. For example, East Hampton, New York, on Long Island is considered part of the New York metropolitan area.

In 2020, the European Commission, the Food and Agriculture Organization, the United Nations Human Settlements Programme, the International Labour Organization, the OECD, and the World Bank have agreed on a common methodological framework for delimitation of urban and rural areas, which contains a definition of metropolitan areas called the Functional urban area. It is defined as a city and its commuting zone, which is a contiguous area of spatial units that have at least 15% of their employed residents working in the city.

In practice, the parameters of metropolitan areas, in both official and unofficial usage, are not consistent. Sometimes they are little different from an urban area, and in other cases, they cover broad regions that have little relation to a single urban settlement; comparative statistics for metropolitan areas should take this into account. The term metropolitan can also refer to a county-level municipal government structure, with some shared services between a central city and its suburbs, which may or may not include the entirety of a metropolitan area. Population figures given for one metro area can vary by millions.

There has been no significant change in the basic concept of metropolitan areas since its adoption in 1950, although significant changes in geographic distributions have occurred since then, and more are expected. Because of the fluidity of the term "metropolitan statistical area", the term used colloquially is more often "metro service area", "metro area", or "MSA", taken to include not only a city but also the surrounding suburban, exurban and sometimes rural areas, all of which the city is presumed to influence. A polycentric metropolitan area contains multiple urban agglomerations not connected by continuous development. In defining a metropolitan area, it is sufficient that a city or cities form a nucleus with which other areas have a high degree of integration.

A metropolitan area is commonly known and characterized by a high concentration in service sector labor and enterprises. Macroeconomics views metropolitan areas as trade regions of economic significance.

Since, presently, urban data are based on arbitrary definitions that vary from country to country and from year or census to the next, making them difficult to compare, an Urban Metric System (UMS) has been conceived that could correct the problem, since it allows computing the urban area limits and central points, and it can be applied in the same way to all past, present and future population and job distributions. It is based on vector field calculations obtained by assuming that, in a given space, all inhabitants and jobs exert the same attractive force A and repulsive force R. The net force (A - R) exerted by each inhabitant or job is given by [1/(1 + d)] - [1/( β + d/2)], where d = distance and β is the only parameter. UMS distinguishes the following types of urban areas, each type corresponding to a given value of β:

| | Urban area | Distance at which the attractive force = the repulsive force | Value of β |
| 1 | Central city | 10 km | 6 |
| 2 | Agglomeration | 20 km | 11 |
| 3 | Metropolis | 40 km | 21 |
| 4 | Patropolis | 80 km | 41 |
| 5 | Megalopolis | 160 km | 81 |
| 6 | Urban system | 320 km | 161 |
| 7 | Urban macrosystem | 640 km | 321 |
| 8 | Continental system | 1,280 km | 641 |
| 9 | Intercontinental system | 2,560 km | 1,281 |
| 10 | World system | 5,120 km | 2,561 |

UMS has been applied to some Canadian cases since 2018, but the data presented in this article are still based on the various existing national definitions, which are disparate.

== List of metropolitan areas ==
=== South Africa ===
The Greater Johannesburg metropolitan area is the fourth largest metropolitan area in Africa. Its population was over 9.6 million as of the 2011 South Africa Census, in contrast to its urban area, which consisted of approximately 7.9 million inhabitants as of 2011. Conversely, metropolitan municipalities in South Africa are defined as commonly governed areas of a metropolitan area. The largest such metropolitan municipal government entity in South Africa is the City of Johannesburg Metropolitan Municipality, which presided over nearly 5 million people as of 2016. However, the Greater Johannesburg metropolitan area houses roughly ten times the population of its core municipal city of Johannesburg, which contained 957,441 people as of the 2011 census.

=== Asia ===
==== Bangladesh ====
In Bangladesh, the large population centres which have significant financial, political and administrative importance are considered to be as Metropolitan cities, which are governed by City Corporations. In total, there are 12 city corporations in Bangladesh. 4 of them (Dhaka North City Corporation, Dhaka South City Corporation, Narayanganj City Corporation, Gazipur City Corporation) are part of Dhaka Metropolitan Area.

==== China ====
In China, there used to be no clear distinction between megalopolis (城市群, lit. city cluster) and metropolitan area (都市圈) until National Development and Reform Commission issued Guidelines on the Cultivation and Development of Modern Metropolitan Areas (关于培育发展现代化都市圈的指导意见) on February 19, 2019, in which a metropolitan area was defined as "an urbanized spatial form in a megalopolis dominated by (a) supercity(-ies) or megacity(-ies), or a large metropolis playing a leading part, and within the basic range of 1-hour commute area."

==== India ====
In India, a metropolitan city is defined as one with a population more than one million. In policing jurisdiction, state governments can declare any city or town with a population exceeding one million as a metropolitan area as per the Code of Criminal Procedure, 1973.

==== Indonesia ====
In Indonesia, the government of Indonesia defines a metropolitan area as an urban agglomeration where its spatial planning is prioritised due to its highly important influence on the country. Jakarta, Surabaya, Bandung, Semarang, Medan, Makassar, Palembang are important metropolitan area in the country. Currently, there are 10 metropolitan cities in Indonesia that have been recognized by the government.

==== Japan ====
Metropolitan areas in Japan include the Greater Tokyo Area, formerly the most populous metropolitan area in the world.

==== Pakistan ====
Pakistan has nine metropolitan areas with populations greater than a million. Five of these are entirely in Punjab including Lahore, Faisalabad, Gujranwala, Multan; one (Islamabad-Rawalpindi) is split between Punjab and the Islamabad Capital Territory; two are located in Sindh, including Karachi, the largest metropolitan area in the country, and Hyderabad; one in Khyber Pakhtunkhwa: Peshawar; and the final in Balochistan: Quetta.

==== Philippines ====
The Philippines currently has three metropolitan areas defined by the National Economic and Development Authority (NEDA). These metropolitan areas are separated into three main geographical areas; Metro Manila (which is located in Luzon), Metro Cebu (which is located in Visayas), Metro Davao (which is located in Mindanao), and Greater Manila Area (which is the largest metropolitan area of Manila). The official definition of each area does not necessarily follow the actual extent of continuous urbanization. For example, the built-up area of Metro Manila has long spilled out of its officially defined borders into the adjacent provinces of Bulacan, Rizal, Laguna, and Cavite known as Greater Manila Area. The number of metropolitan areas in the Philippines was reduced from 13 in 2007 to the current three based from the 2017–2022 Philippine Development Plan by NEDA. The other 10 metropolitan areas were Metro Angeles, Metro Bacolod, Metro Baguio, Metro Batangas, Metro Cagayan de Oro, Metro Dagupan, Metro Iloilo–Guimaras, Metro Butuan, Metro Naga, and Metro Olongapo.

==== Turkey ====
The word metropolitan describes the central municipality governing local services in a province with more than 750.000 residents in Turkey, like Istanbul and its metropolitan municipality, the Istanbul Metropolitan Municipality. There are 30 officially defined "metropolitan municipalities" in Turkey. This classification, however, is only used for administrative purposes, and sometimes contradicts the colloquial use of the term "metro area". As an example, Gebze, a district in Kocaeli province and thus in the jurisdiction of the Kocaeli Metropolitan Municipality, is arguably within the metro area of Istanbul with many of its residents commuting to Istanbul for work and the Marmaray, a commuter rail line, extending into the district. The district however, as previously mentioned, is not a part of Istanbul's provincial limits, and thus not subject to the jurisdiction of its metropolitan municipality. The word metropolitan (municipality) is generally only used as an administrative distinction in Turkey.

==== United Arab Emirates ====
Dubai-Sharjah-Ajman (DSA) is a metropolitan area in the United Arab Emirates. It consists of the combined, greater urban areas of Dubai, Ajman, and Sharjah. The urban areas at the northeast end of Dubai flow into those of Sharjah, which in turn are contiguous with those of Ajman. The total population is about 5.9 million people as of 2023

=== Europe ===
==== European Union ====
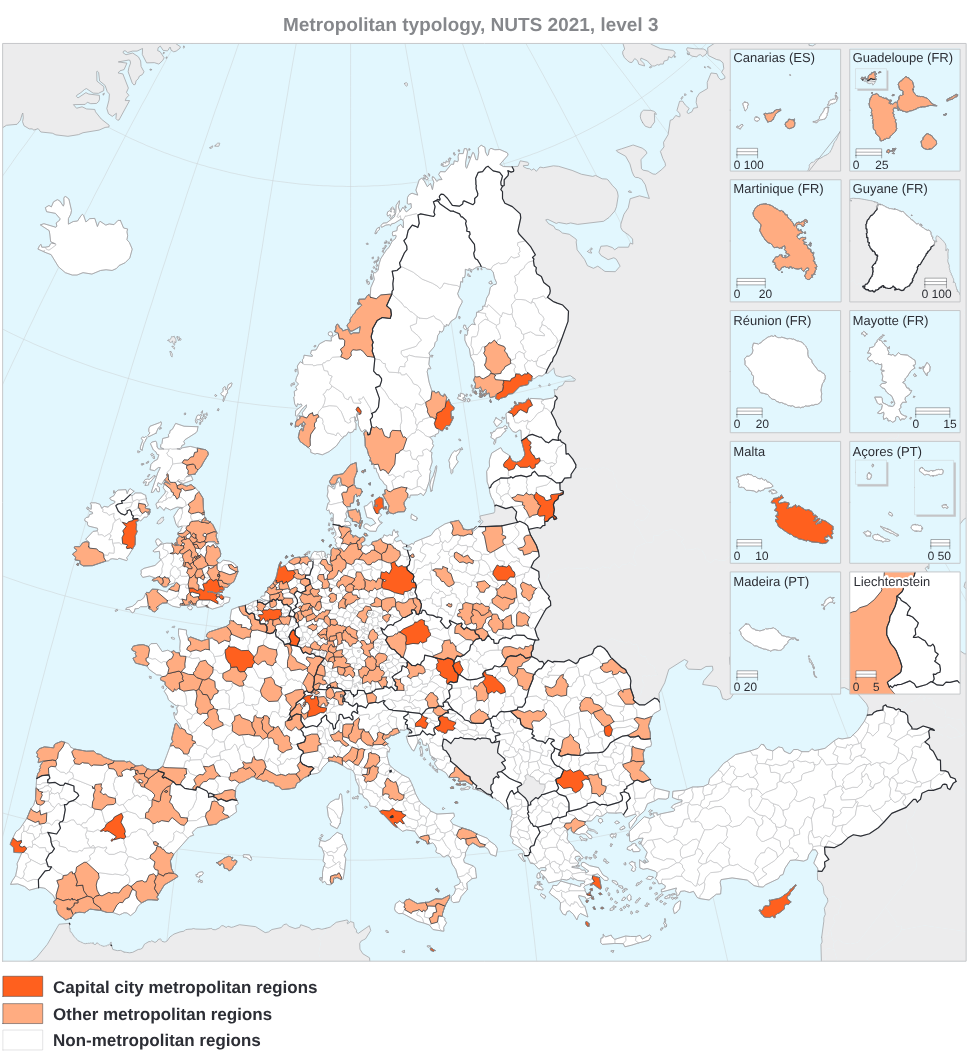
Map of metropolitan regions by Eurostat in 2021

The European Union's statistical agency Eurostat, in partnership with OECD, has created a concept named functional urban area (FUA). The FUA represents an attempt at a harmonised definition of the metropolitan area, and the goal was to have an area from which a significant share of the residents commute into the city. The FUA consists of a city and its commuting zone, which is a contiguous area of spatial units that have at least 15% of their employed residents working in the city.

A further, derived concept is the typology of metropolitan regions. A NUTS 3 region (or a group thereof) is considered to be metropolitan, if at least 50% of its residents live inside a FUA with a population of 250,000 or more. NUTS 3 regions not meeting these criteria are considered to be non-metropolitan regions.

==== France ====
France's national statistics office, INSEE, names an urban core and its surrounding area of commuter influence an aire d'attraction d'une ville (AAV, literally meaning "catchment area of a city"), plural: aires d'attraction des villes. The official translation of this statistical area in English (as used by INSEE) is "functional area". The AAV follows the same definition as the Functional Urban Area (FUA) used by Eurostat and the OECD, and the AAVs are thus strictly comparable to the FUAs.

The AAV replaced in 2020 the metropolitan statistical area called aire urbaine (AU). The AU, which was defined differently than the AAV, has now been discarded by INSEE and replaced with the AAV in order to facilitate international comparisons.

==== Germany ====
The German government defines eleven metro areas that are the most densely populated areas in the Federal Republic of Germany. They comprise the major German cities and their surrounding catchment areas and form the political, commercial and cultural centers of the country. For urban centers outside metropolitan areas, that generate a similar attraction at smaller scale for their region, the concept of the Regiopolis and respectively regiopolitan area or region was introduced by German professors in 2006.

==== Italy ====
In 2001 Italy redefined 14 provinces of some of the country's largest cities into "metropolitan cities".

==== Sweden ====
Swedish metro areas were defined around 1965. In 2005, a number of further municipalities were added to the defined areas.

==== United Kingdom ====
The United Kingdom's Office for National Statistics defines "travel to work areas" as areas where "at least 75% of an area's resident workforce work in the area and at least 75% of the people who work in the area also live in the area". The European Union's ESPON group has compiled a separate list of metropolitan areas which covers the UK.

=== North America ===
==== Canada ====
In Canada, a census metropolitan area (CMA) or census agglomeration (CA) consists of one or more neighboring municipalities centered around a core population. A CMA requires a total population of at least 100,000, with 50,000 or more residing in the core, while a CA requires a core population of at least 10,000. Both are determined using data from Canada's Census of Population Program, and surrounding municipalities must demonstrate strong economic integration with the core, measured by commuting patterns.

==== United States ====
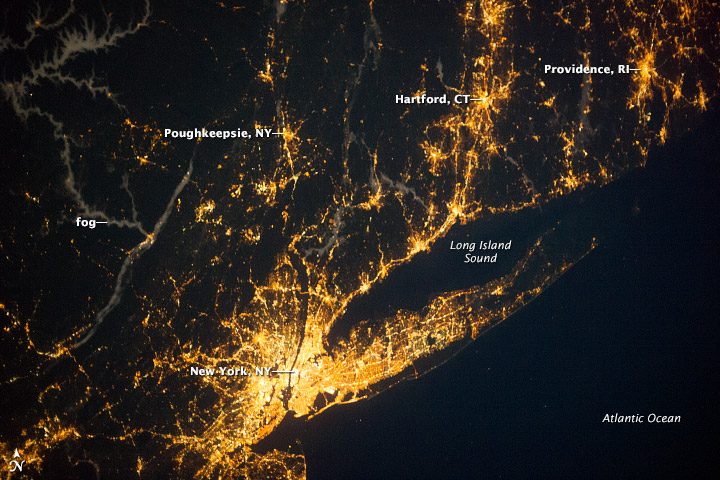
Satellite image of the New York metropolitan area, the largest metropolitan area in the United States and one of the largest in the world, with Long Island in the east and Manhattan at the center of the densest part of the image

In the United States, metropolitan areas are delineated around the core of a core based statistical area, which is defined as an urban area and includes central and outlying counties. In other countries metropolitan areas are sometimes anchored by one central city such as the Paris metropolitan area (Paris). In other cases, metropolitan areas contain multiple centers that are equal or close to equal in importance, especially in the United States; for example, the Dallas–Fort Worth metropolitan area has eight principal cities. The Islamabad–Rawalpindi metropolitan area in Pakistan, the Rhine-Ruhr in Germany, and the Randstad in The Netherlands are other examples.

In the United States, the concept of metropolitan statistical areas has gained prominence. The area of the Greater Washington metropolitan area is an example of statistically grouping independent cities and county areas from various states to form a larger city because of proximity, history, and recent urban convergence. Metropolitan areas may themselves be part of a greater megalopolis. For urban centres located outside metropolitan areas that generate a similar attraction at a smaller scale for a region, the concept of a regiopolis and a respective regiopolitan area, or regio, was introduced by German professors in 2006. In the United States, the term micropolitan statistical area is used.

As of February 28, 2013, the United States Office of Management and Budget (OMB) defined 1,098 statistical areas for the metropolitan areas of the United States and Puerto Rico. These 1,098 statistical areas comprise 929 Core-Based Statistical Areas (CBSAs) and 169 Combined Statistical Areas (CSAs). The 929 Core-Based Statistical Areas are divided into 388 Metropolitan Statistical Areas (MSAs – 381 for the U.S. and seven for Puerto Rico) and 541 Micropolitan Statistical Areas (μSAs – 536 for the U.S. and five for Puerto Rico). The 169 Combined Statistical Areas (166 for the U.S. and three for Puerto Rico) each comprise two or more adjacent Core Based Statistical Areas.

The OMB defines a Metropolitan Statistical Area as one or more adjacent counties or county equivalents that have at least one urban area of at least 50,000 population, plus adjacent territory that has a high degree of economic and social integration with the core as measured by commuting ties. The OMB then defines a Combined Statistical Area as consisting of various combinations of adjacent metropolitan and micropolitan statistical areas with economic ties measured by commuting patterns. The Office of Management and Budget further defines a core-based statistical area (CBSA) to be a geographical area that consists of one or more counties (or equivalents) anchored by an urban center of at least 10,000 people plus adjacent counties that are socioeconomically tied to the urban center by commuting.

==== Mexico ====
Metropolitan areas are known as zonas metropolitanas in Mexico. The National Population Council (CONAPO) defines them as:

- a set of two or more municipalities where a city with a population of at least 100,000 is located, and whose urban area, functions and activities exceed the limits of the municipality.
- municipalities with a city of more than 500,000 inhabitants, or a city of more than 200,000 inhabitants located in the northern and southern border areas and in the coastal zone.
- municipalities where state capitals are located, if they are not already included in a metropolitan zone.

=== Oceania ===
==== Australia ====
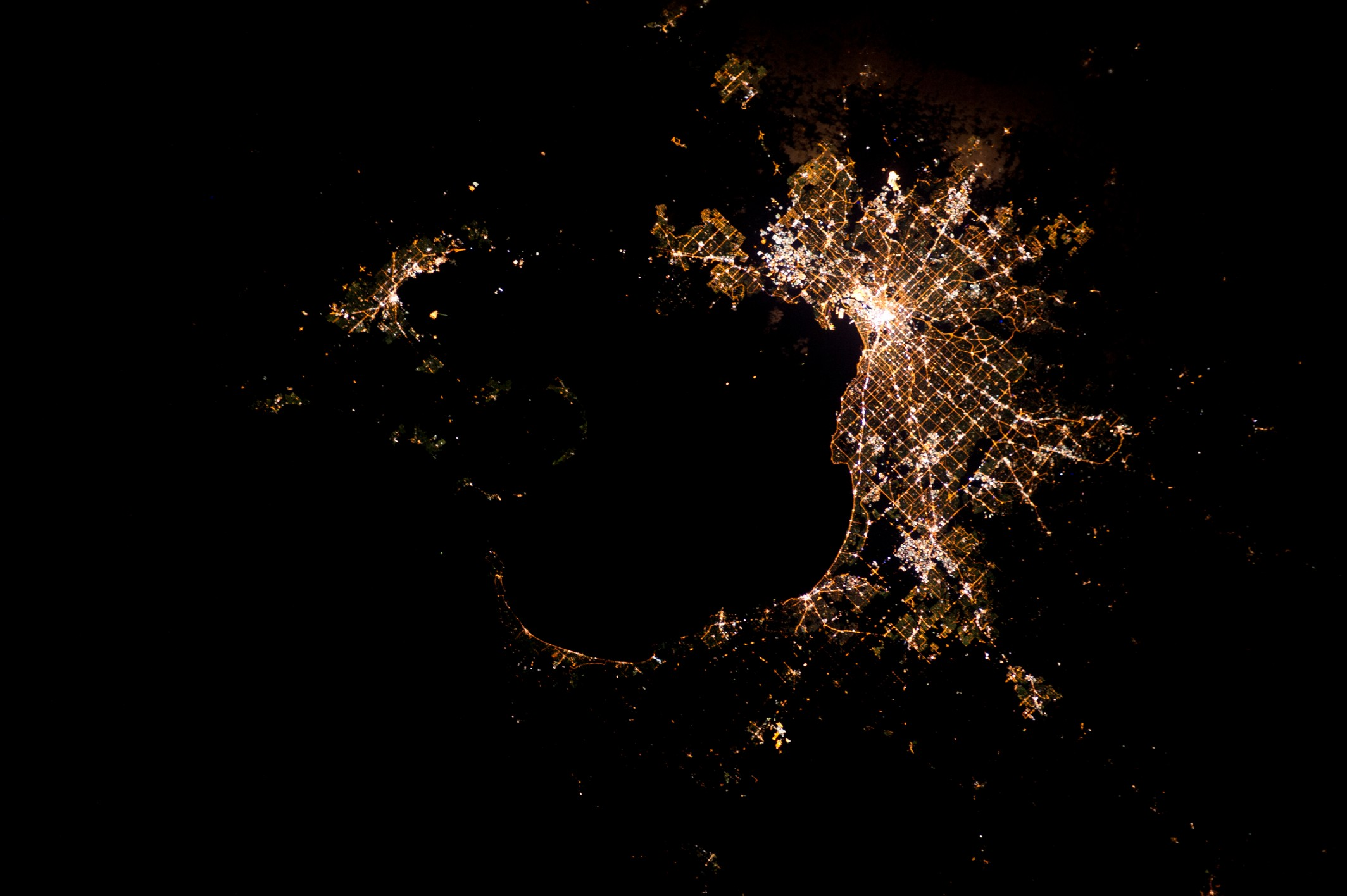
The Melbourne metropolitan area in Australia seen at night from the International Space Station

The Australian Bureau of Statistics uses Greater Capital City Statistical Areas (GCCSAs), which are geographical areas designed to represent the functional extent of each of the eight state and territory capital cities. They were designed to reflect labor markets, using the 2011 Census "travel to work" data. Labor markets are sometimes used as proxy measures of the functional extent of a city as it contains the majority of the commuting population. GCCSAs replaced "Statistical Divisions" used until 2011.

Other metropolitan areas in Australia include cross border cities or continuous built-up areas between two or more cities that are connected by an extensive public transport network that allows for commuting for work or services.

==== Brazil ====
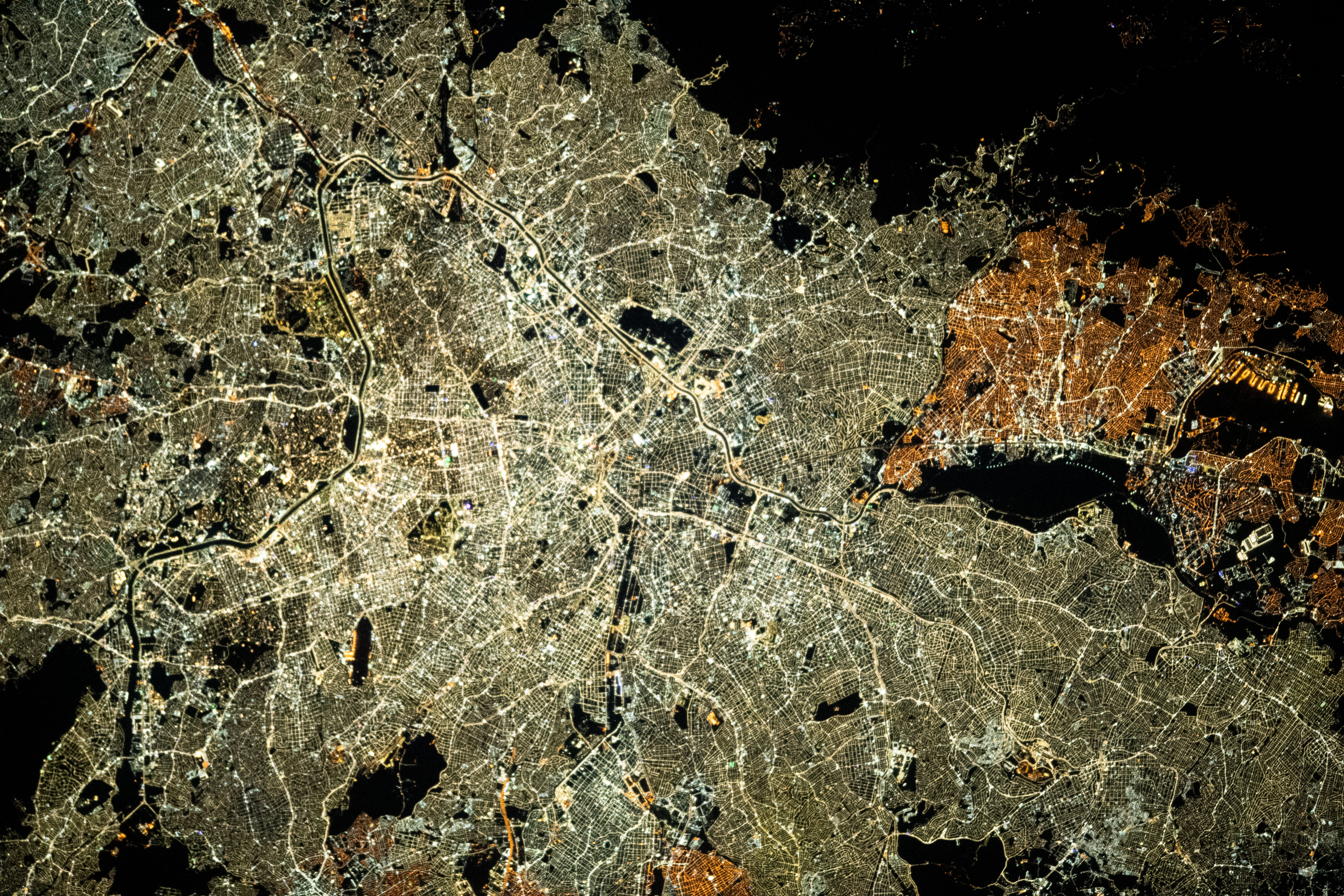
Greater São Paulo in Brazil seen at night from the International Space Station

In Brazil, the terms metropolitan area (Portuguese: região metropolitana) and urban agglomeration (aglomeração urbana) have specific meanings. They are defined by federal and state legislation as collections of municipalities focused on "integrating the organization, planning and execution of public functions of common interest". An integrated development area (região integrada de desenvolvimento) is one of the two above structures that crosses state (or Federal District) boundaries.

The IBGE defines also "Immediate Geographic Areas" (formerly termed microregions) which capture the region "surrounding urban centers for the supply of immediate needs of the population". Intended for policy planning purposes, as of March 2021 census data is not tabulated on the level of these Areas, but instead at the municipality or state level.

==== Chile ====
There are three metropolitan areas in Chile, the biggest and most important one is the Gran Santiago in the Santiago Metropolitan Region. The other two metro areas are Gran Valparaiso in the Valparaiso Region with almost a million inhabitants, and Gran Concepción in the Bio Bio Region, with a population of about a million people living in it. Smaller "metropolitan" areas are known as conurbations. Conurbaciones tend to have a bit over 200.000 inhabitants to be considered as such. An example is the Conurbacion de Rancagua, which considers the area shared by the city of Rancagua, and the adjacent smaller towns of Machalí, Gultro and Graneros.

== See also ==
- Developed environments
- Economic restructuring
- Metropolitan statistical area
- Metropolitan economy
- Urban sprawl
- Urban heat island
- List of metropolitan areas that overlap multiple countries
- List of metropolitan areas by population
- List of metropolitan areas in Asia
- List of metropolitan areas in Africa
- List of metropolitan areas in the Americas
  - List of North American metropolitan areas by population
  - List of Metropolitan Statistical Areas
- List of metropolitan areas in Europe
  - List of metropolitan areas (LUZ) in the European Union
