= Capital of Wales =

Selection process for Wales' capital city

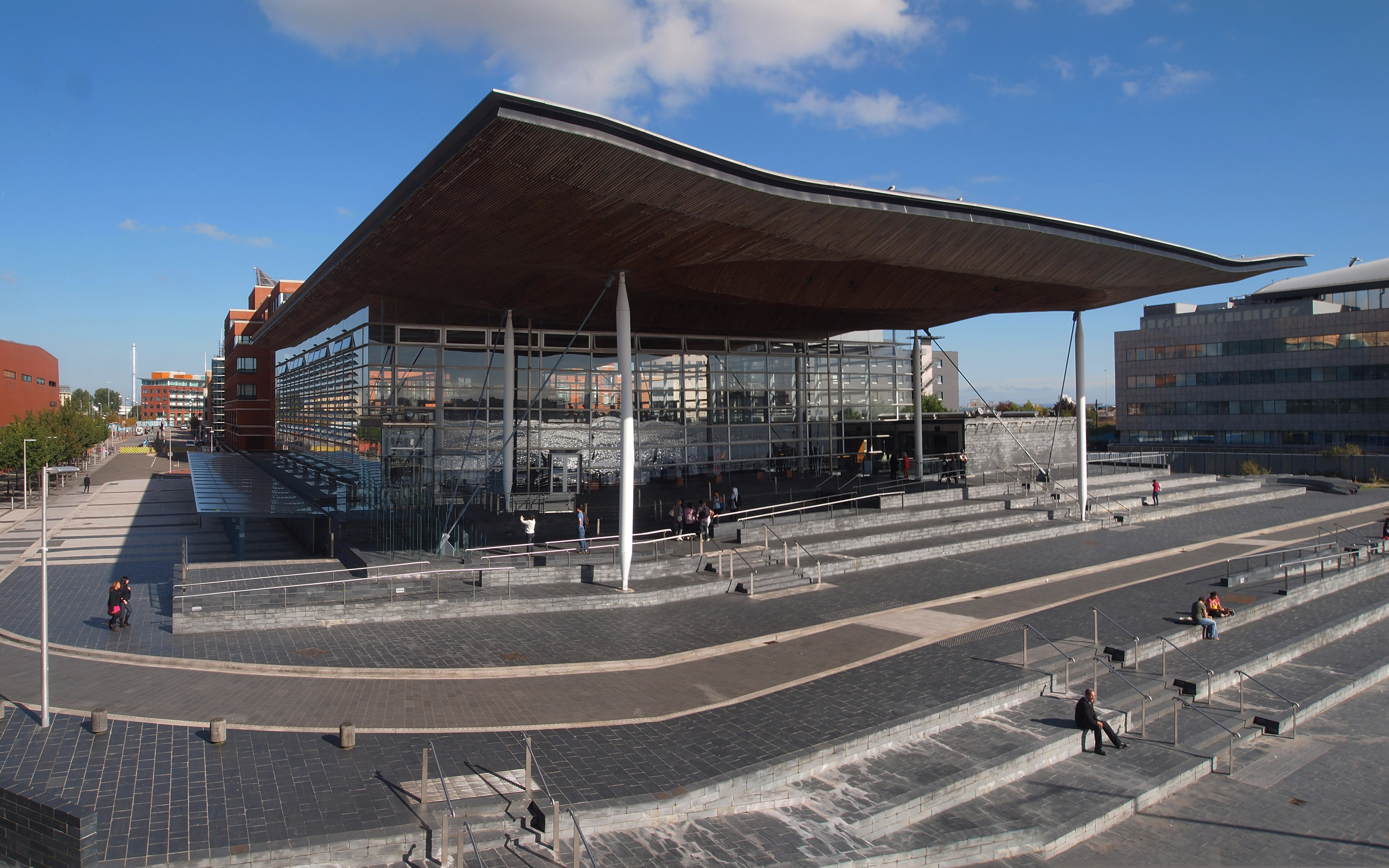
The Senedd building, since 2006 the seat of the Senedd, the Welsh Parliament

Map of Wales with current capital and other cities mentioned in the article marked

The current capital of Wales is Cardiff. Historically, Wales did not have a definite capital. In 1955, the Minister for Welsh Affairs informally proclaimed Cardiff to be the capital of Wales. Since 1964, Cardiff has been home to government offices for Wales, and since 1999 it has been the seat of the Senedd.

== History ==
Between the end of Roman rule and the conquest by Edward I in the late 13th century, Wales was usually divided between four kingdoms. There were only brief periods where the land was dominated by a single ruler, most notably by Gruffydd ap Llywelyn in the 11th century. Rather than being based in a fixed location, Welsh kings would maintain an itinerant court, as was the norm in medieval Europe.

In the past, multiple places have served as a seat of the government of Wales, including:

- Abergwyngregyn the seat of the Kingdom of Gwynedd
- Strata Florida Abbey, the Cistercian abbey where Llywelyn the Great held council in 1238.
- Machynlleth, where Owain Glyndŵr held a parliament in 1404.
- Ludlow (Welsh Llwydlo, in Shropshire, England), seat of the Council of Wales and the Marches from 1473 to 1689.

The ecclesiastical capital of Wales is St Davids, the resting place of the country's patron saint, Saint David.

In the 19th century, Cardiff grew to become the largest settlement in Wales, due to its role as a port for exporting coal from the South Wales Valleys. By 1881, it had overtaken both Swansea and Merthyr Tydfil to become the country's most populous urban area, and in 1905, it received city status. In subsequent years, an increasing number of Welsh national institutions were founded in the city, including the National Museum of Wales (chartered in 1907), Welsh National War Memorial (unveiled 1928), and the Registry Building (1903) of the University of Wales. However, the National Library of Wales (chartered 1907) is located in Aberystwyth. This was partly because the library's founder, Sir John Williams, did not think that Cardiff was a Welsh city in character. The investiture of the Prince of Wales took place within the shell of Caernarfon Castle when the ceremony was revived in 1911 and 1969. Since 1920, the election of the Archbishop of Wales has taken place in Llandrindod Wells, chosen for its central location.

In the 20th century, Welsh local authorities debated where a new capital of Wales should be, with 76 out of 161 opting for Cardiff in a 1924 poll, organised by the South Wales Daily News. The authorities were mostly split between Cardiff and Caernarfon, with a smaller faction supporting Aberystwyth. The discussions stalled and progress was not made until 1950.

=== Recognition of Cardiff ===
The government of the Labour Prime Minister, Clement Attlee, had not named a capital of Wales during his government. Attlee noted that a number of cities made claims to the status, and that the Council for Wales and Monmouthshire did not raise what he considered to be a domestic issue with the Government. In his inaugural speech as Lord Mayor of Cardiff, George Williams argued that Cardiff should be considered the capital of Wales. David Llewellyn was elected MP for Cardiff North in 1950 and also campaigned for recognising Cardiff. Campaigning for Cardiff stepped up and the city took steps to promote its 'Welshness'. The stalemate over which city should be the new capital was broken when Cardiganshire County Council decided to support Cardiff and, in a 1955 poll of local authorities, 134 out of 161 voted for the city.

On 20 December 1955, Gwilym Lloyd-George, then Minister for Welsh Affairs and Home Secretary, said the government would regard Cardiff as the capital of Wales, in a reply to a Parliamentary question from David Llewellyn. Lloyd-George said that "no formal measures are necessary to give effect to this decision" The Encyclopaedia of Wales says that the decision to regard the city as the capital of Wales "had more to do with the fact that it contained marginal Conservative constituencies than any reasoned view of what functions a Welsh capital should have".

=== Government institutions ===
Cardiff only became a centre of national administration with the establishment of the Welsh Office in 1964, which later prompted the creation of various other public bodies such as the Arts Council of Wales and the Welsh Development Agency, most of which were based in Cardiff.

In a 1997 referendum, Wales narrowly voted in favour of establishing the National Assembly for Wales (now known as the Senedd), although only 44% supported the proposal in Cardiff. Due to the relative lack of support for the Assembly locally, and disagreements between the Welsh Office and Cardiff Council over where it should sit, there was a brief period of speculation that the Assembly would be established elsewhere. In March 1998, Ron Davies, then the Secretary of State for Wales, confirmed that the location would be in Cardiff. He said that the Cardiff proposals were "too compelling to resist", because "in making this decision, I am mindful that Wales has invested 40 years in promoting Cardiff as our capital city." After its inauguration in 1999, the Assembly initially met at a temporary home at Tŷ Hywel in Cardiff Bay, until the adjacent Senedd building was completed in 2006. It has been based there ever since.
