= Swansea Bay City Region =

Swansea Bay City Region Dinas-Ranbarth Bae Abertawe
- City region

- A map showing the location of Swansea Bay City Region in Wales
- Sovereign state: United Kingdom
- Constituent country: Wales
- Principal areas: List: Carmarthenshire; Neath Port Talbot; Pembrokeshire; Swansea

Area
  - Total: 1,855 sq mi (4,805 km^{2})

Population (2011)
  - Total: 685,051
  - Density: 369.3/sq mi (142.6/km^{2})
- Website: https://www.swanseabaycitydeal.wales/

The Swansea Bay City Region (Welsh: Dinas-Ranbarth Bae Abertawe), is a city region in Wales. It is a partnership between the local authorities of Carmarthenshire, Neath Port Talbot, Pembrokeshire and Swansea, local businesses in southwest Wales and other organisations with the support of the Welsh Government. The Swansea Bay City Region is coterminous with the area defined as South West Wales.

== Historical background ==
Local authorities in the South West Wales area made a bid for city region status during early 2012. A report to the Welsh Government in July 2012 recommended the creation of city regions in Wales to help improve economic performance compared with the rest of the United Kingdom. The Swansea Bay City Region was launched in July 2013 following a consultation period by the Welsh Government resulting in a report recommending its creation. The launch event was held at Parc y Scarlets where the Swansea Bay City Region Economic Regeneration Strategy was presented which identified several key economic areas to develop. Sir Terry Matthews has been appointed chairman of the Swansea Bay City Region Board.

== Tidal power ==
There is a plan to build a barrage across Swansea Bay and direct water from the incoming and outgoing tides through turbines to generate electricity from tidal power as a form of renewable energy. The project's backers require the UK government to guarantee the price of the electricity it generates. As of 2021 this guarantee has not been forthcoming.

== See also ==
- South West Wales
- South West Wales Corporate Joint Committee
- Cardiff Capital Region
- Regional economy in Wales
