= Glasgow City Region =

- City region
- Sovereign state: United Kingdom
- Country: Scotland
- Status: City region
- Admin HQ: Glasgow
- Comprises: Glasgow City; East Dunbartonshire; East Renfrewshire; Inverclyde; North Lanarkshire; Renfrewshire; South Lanarkshire; West Dunbartonshire

Government
  - Cabinet Chair: Cllr Susan Aitken (Glasgow City Council)
  - Cabinet: Council Leaders: Vaughan Moody (East Dunbartonshire); Tony Buchanan (East Renfrewshire); Stephen McCabe (Inverclyde); Jim Logue (North Lanarkshire); Iain Nicolson (Renfrewshire); John Ross (South Lanarkshire); Jonathan McColl (West Dunbartonshire)

Area
  - Total: 1,289 sq mi (3,338 km^{2})

Population
  - Total: 1,817,870
  - Density: 1,411/sq mi (544.6/km^{2})

The Glasgow City Region (previously Glasgow and Clyde Valley City Region, also known as Clydeside) is a somewhat urbanised city region in the western central belt of Scotland nestled in the Clyde Valley and consisting of the following eight councils: East Dunbartonshire, East Renfrewshire, Glasgow City Council, Inverclyde, North Lanarkshire, Renfrewshire, South Lanarkshire, and West Dunbartonshire. The councils, along with several others, had previously formed the Strathclyde region between 1974 and 1996.

== Local government ==
The official region consists of the following councils:

Unitary Authority	Population	Area (km^{2})	Pop. Density (per km^{2})
East Dunbartonshire	107,540	174.5	616
East Renfrewshire	93,810	174.3	538
Glasgow City Council	615,080	174.7	3,520
Inverclyde	79,160	160.5	493
North Lanarkshire	339,390	469.9	722
Renfrewshire	175,930	261.5	672
South Lanarkshire	317,100	1,771	179
West Dunbartonshire	89,860	158.8	565
Total (2016)	1,817,870	3,504	519
