= Metropolitan economy =

A metropolitan economy refers to the cohesive, naturally evolving concentration of industries, commerce, markets, firms, housing, human capital, infrastructure and other economic elements that are comprised in a particular metropolitan area. Rather than the definition of distinct urban and suburban economies that evolve and function independently, a metropolitan economy encompasses all interdependent jurisdictions of particular regional clusters. This type of economy has all its units functioning together in a trans-boundary landscape that often crosses city, county, state, province, and even national lines. Metropolitan economies expand from the parochial view taken in urban economics which focuses entirely on a city's spatial structure, and broadens it into a metropolitan's spatial and social/economic structure.

== Development ==
In the latest evolution of global economic restructuring, metropolitan economies have become as experts at the Brookings Institution Metropolitan Policy Program assert, "the engines of the New Economy". Globalization has essentially reconfigured localities, placing value on the unique, innovative assets that have been historically formed and attuned to the local area. Embodied within metropolitan economies is what Saskia Sassen describes as the global city but branches out to include the central business district and its satellites. The accelerated advancement of transportation and communications, particularly with capital flight, outsourcing, and supply chain logistics, has virtually removed factor endowments and comparative advantage concepts. In its wake, metropolitan economies are competing globally in specialized sectors and fields tailored to their regional clusters, a term coined by Harvard Professor Michael Porter (i.e., information technology in greater San Francisco; leather shoe and apparel textiles industry in Florence, Italy; digital media and electronics in Seoul, South Korea).

More and more developed nations are becoming defined and fueled by their local, metropolitan economies. Before, analysis focused on what happens inside companies, how inputs of labor and capital are used for productivity of output. Now, what happens outside companies in the immediate business environment is also important. With global competition in innovation of processes and products, the clustering of knowledge (such as the research community), consulting firms, skilled laborers, financial institutions, legal services, government entities, and specialized technology industries have become important. Such agglomeration and diversity, unique to a metro, catalyzes growth. Additionally, auxiliary industries in local services and trades evolve in such metropolitan areas, such as the production of wind turbines in the automotive industry of the greater Detroit and Cleveland areas. Cultural ambience even emerges with the area's quality of place and historical heritage in the form of the arts (art galleries, music halls, publishing houses), non-profit venues (museums, performing arts theaters), and public assets (libraries, parks).

== Legislation ==
This new configuration of metropolitan economies requires new and adaptive government policymaking. For effective policymaking, contemporary nations must change their understanding of place, moving away from disparate states, provinces, and regions and embracing a network of integrated metropolitan economies. Hence, metros must become a recognized actor among the usual federal-state-local apparatus. Additionally, government departments and ministries must acknowledge the interplay of arenas such as the inflexible tandem of housing and transportation as well as energy and the environment. Coordinated efforts across agencies and programs must take place to ensure best performance outcomes and high efficiency. Furthermore, management must change from prescriptive, formulaic, hierarchical leadership to more nimble, networked, and compact collaborations. These organizational reforms would influence a host of policies including transportation infrastructure, housing systems, employment hubs, energy standards, green spaces, and environmental protection.

For instance, the incorporation of metropolitan planning organizations (MPOs) in US DOT programs and emergence of metropolitan governments worldwide are evidence of the impact of metropolitan economies. Other concrete examples include building the Metrorail system, which required coordinated agreement between the Washington, D.C., Virginia, and Maryland environs; likewise, high-speed rail in Spain which connects virtually every large metro in the country. Chicago's Plan for Transformation in overhauling the city's public housing stock has to work together with local stakeholders on lease agreements, land use, economic development, and local taxes. The Triangle Area's high tech life sciences research hub, the Research Triangle Park, continually works together with surrounding research universities in Durham, Raleigh, and Chapel Hill. Denver's expanded metropolitan transportation system needed a surrounding mayor caucus for joint efforts. The Hong Kong Airport and Shenzhen Airport dual services link that aim to capitalize on "the synergy of their complementary flight networks" required agreement between Hong Kong and China. The Channel Tunnel, an undersea rail tunnel under the English Channel, required cooperation and financing between the French and Britain governments. The Port of Rio de Janeiro serves the city and surrounding states in Brazil. All these partnered, comprehensive initiatives are crucial in metropolitan economies.

== Examples ==
Many examples of the metropolitan economies worldwide include (see links below):

- The financial commerce of Chicago and media/entertainment of Miami, both of which metros contribute a significant share of their state's economies;
- The investment banks and insurance company capital of Tokyo and electronics headquarters of Osaka, both of which metros fuel Japan's economy;
- Munich's high-tech agglomeration of automotive engineering, aerospace, communications, life sciences that contribute greatly to Germany's output;
- Mumbai's financial district and Bengaluru's biotechnology industries that have become powerful growing assets for India;
- The chemical products, textiles, transportation equipment, and finance in tertiary sector of São Paulo, which is Brazil's largest metro;
- Toronto's agglomeration of the Automotive industry, Steel production, communications, architecture and construction all contribute to Canada's output.
