= March 2017 United Kingdom budget =

2017 United Kingdom budget
- Presented: Wednesday 8 March 2017
- Parliament: 56th
- Party: Conservative Party
- Chancellor: Philip Hammond
- Total revenue: £744 billion
- Total expenditures: £802 billion
- Deficit: £58 billion (2.9% of GDP)

The March 2017 United Kingdom budget was delivered by Philip Hammond, the Chancellor of the Exchequer, to the House of Commons on Wednesday, 8 March 2017. The last budget to be held in the spring until 2020, it was Hammond's first as Chancellor of the Exchequer since being appointed to the role in July 2016.

== 2017–18 taxes and spending ==
=== Taxes ===
| Receipts | 2017-2018 revenues (£ billions). |
|---|---|
| Income Tax | 175 |
| Value Added Tax (VAT) | 143 |
| National Insurance | 130 |
| Corporate Tax | 52 |
| Excise duties | 48 |
| Council Tax | 32 |
| Business rates | 30 |
| Other | 134 |
| Total Government revenue | 744 |

=== Spending ===
| Department | 2017-2018 Expenditure (£ billions). |
|---|---|
| Social protection | 245 |
| Health | 149 |
| Education | 102 |
| Defence | 48 |
| Debt interest | 46 |
| Housing and Environment | 36 |
| Transport | 37 |
| Public order and safety | 34 |
| Personal social services | 32 |
| Industry, agriculture and employment | 23 |
| Other | 50 |
| Total Government spending | 802 |
