= Meibion Glyndŵr =

Welsh nationalist organisation

- Sons of Glyndŵr
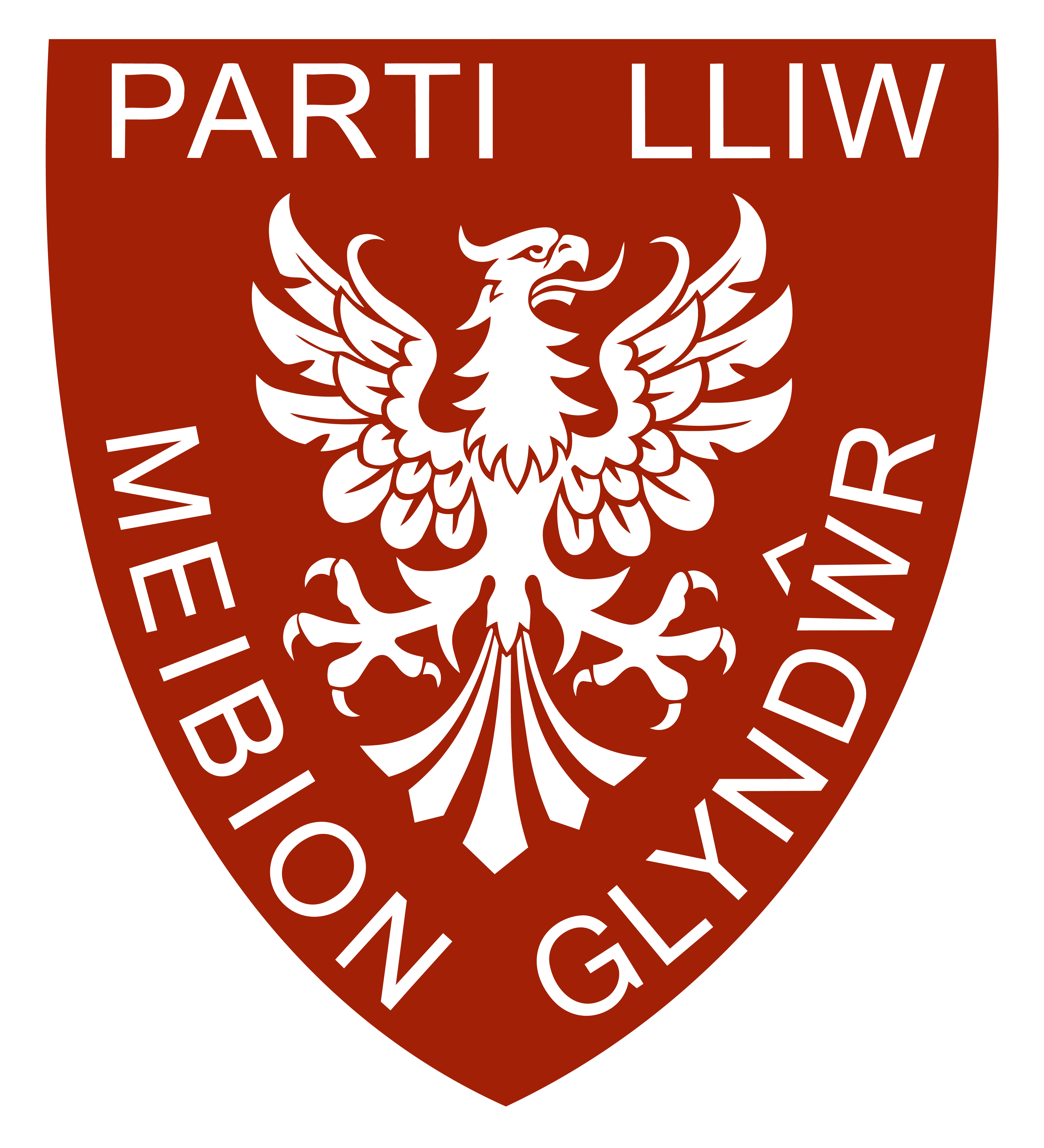
- Reconstruction of the badge worn by members of Parti Lliw Meibion Glyndŵr during the 1989 "Abergele Martyrs" commemoration march
- Dates active: 1979–1993
- Active regions: Wales; England
- Ideology: Welsh nationalism Welsh republicanism Anti-English sentiment Anti-imperialism; Anti-capitalism

Meibion Glyndŵr (Welsh pronunciation: [ˈmeibjɔn ɡlɨnˈduːr], also known by its translation Sons of Glyndŵr) was a Welsh nationalist paramilitary group which carried out 328 attacks, including 228 arson attacks against holiday cottages in Wales owned by English people, and other attacks against government offices and estate agent offices between 1979 and 1993.

The organisation was founded in 1979, during a period of increasing nationalist sentiment in Wales. During this period, significant sections of Welsh public opinion opposed the purchase of second homes or holiday cottages in Wales by English buyers, regarding it as a contributing factor to rising housing prices and a potential threat to Welsh-speaking communities. Only one person connected to the group was arrested in 1993, marking the end of the campaign.

== History ==
=== Origins ===
In December 1962, the Western Mail reported that Birmingham Corporation had received a letter signed "Meibion Glyndŵr" threatening to poison the water supply of the planned Clywedog Reservoir. A similar threat was made in relation to Llyn Celyn during the flooding of Tryweryn, although no such action was ever taken; the name didn't re-emerge until almost two decades later. The name refers to Owain Glyndŵr, who led a major Welsh rebellion against English rule in the early 15th century. Following the failure of the 1979 Welsh devolution referendum, the militant organisation launched its first attacks in December of that year.

The first attacks occurred in the early hours of 13 December 1979, during which a holiday home in Nefyn, another in Llanbedrog, and a further two near Llanrhian in Pembrokeshire were set alight. In the days that followed, it was reported that another two holiday homes in Pennal near Machynlleth had been targeted. The devices used in these attacks were reportedly crude, consisting of sulphuric acid contained within a wax tube and a condom. Given the geographical distance between the attacks and the near-simultaneous detonation of the devices, the possibility that they were carried out by a single arsonist was ruled out. This marked the beginning of the arson campaign. In the first wave of attacks that followed, 22 English-owned holiday homes were destroyed within the space of a month. Initially, no movement claimed responsibility for the arson attacks; however, an anonymous letter, written in Welsh, was posted to HTV Wales head Geraint Talfan Davies, which read:

The houses were burnt with great sadness. We are not ferocious men. It was an act of despair. The rural areas are being destroyed all over these islands. Wales is our concern. These homes are out of reach of local people because of the economic situation. We call upon individuals of goodwill to take steps before these sorry acts take place.

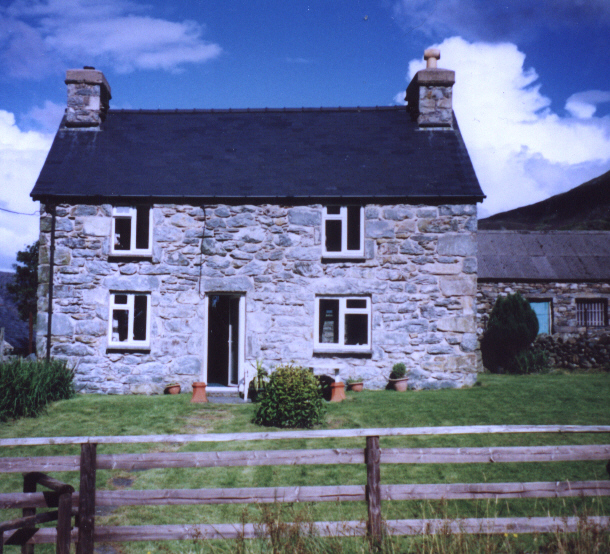
Example of a former Welsh farmhouse converted into a holiday cottage near Harlech, 2002

Copies of the same letter were also sent to a number of prominent individuals and organisations in Wales, including the BBC, Western Mail, Dafydd Wigley, Dafydd Elis-Thomas and Geraint Howells, among others. Both Cymdeithas yr Iaith Gymraeg (Welsh Language Society) and Mudiad Adfer (lit. 'restoration movement') were quick to distance themselves from the attacks, and Rhodri Williams, then deputy chairman of Cymdeithas, insisted that the group's second home campaign was dormant while it focused on securing a Welsh-language television channel. Similarly, Plaid Cymru condemned the spate of arson, and Dafydd Elis-Thomas, then Member of Parliament (MP) for Meirionnydd Nant Conwy, described it as "senseless".

Over the following decade, the campaign resulted in damage to 228 holiday cottages across Wales. Attacks typically occurred during the winter months, when properties were more likely to be vacant. The only injury associated with the campaign occurred when a staircase collapsed at a targeted estate agency in London, injuring a fireman. The campaign reached its peak in the late 1980s with the targeting of Conservative Party MPs' homes with letter bombs, most notably that of David Hunt, the then Secretary of State for Wales, who was targeted in 1990. A contemporaneous arson campaign targeting English-owned properties on the Isle of Man was also taking place, attributed to Manx nationalist organisation Fo Sostyn, Fo Ordaag (Manx for 'under England, under the thumb'). Ben Lake later suggested a potential link between the two campaigns, although this was never confirmed.

=== Claims of responsibility ===
Throughout the campaign, four separate movements were reported to have claimed responsibility for the bombings: Mudiad Amddiffyn Cymru (lit. 'movement for the defence of Wales'; MAC), Cadwyr Cymru (lit. 'keepers of Wales'), Meibion Glyndŵr, and the Workers' Army of the Welsh Republic (WAWR; Welsh: wawr, lit. 'dawn'), whose attacks were on political targets in the early 1980s.

==== Cadwyr Cymru ====
Cadwyr Cymru was the first organisation to claim responsibility, a claim reported on the BBC programme Nationwide on 12 March 1980 after a letter from the group, postmarked in Bala, was delivered to the BBC office in Bangor. Posted a day before a house in Gwynfe was struck by an attack, the letter claimed responsibility and cited a plastic bowl left outside a previously targeted house in Rhos-y-gwaliau as proof of its authenticity. The letter, signed off by "Cadfridog Gwynedd" (lit. 'Gwynedd general'), further claimed, "What the IRA has achieved so shall we." Two further letters, postmarked in Bala and Oswestry, were received by police in Caernarfon, both repeating the Cadwyr Cymru claim and describing the group as a coalition organised along a cell structure, and alleging support from the Provisional Irish Republican Army (Provisional IRA) and militant Basque separatist group Euskadi Ta Askatasuna (ETA).

==== Mudiad Amddiffyn Cymru ====
John Barnard Jenkins, former leader of Mudiad Amddiffyn Cymru and a key figure in its bombing campaign in the 1960s, was interviewed on Nationwide during its broadcast on 12 March 1980. He had initially been interviewed by BBC Wales' Heddiw the day after the first attacks on 13 December 1979, but the interview was never broadcast. During the Nationwide broadcast, he outlined the motivations for those involved in the arson campaign and suggested that those responsible were associated with MAC, noting that most of the organisation's cells had never been identified following the 1960s bombing campaign. Jenkins, however, said that he was not personally involved. Prior to the interview, an anonymous note signed "Mudiad Amddiffyn Cymru" was handed to a BBC journalist, which claimed responsibility for the campaign. Former Western Mail journalist John Humphries later theorised that Meibion Glyndŵr was a third iteration of MAC, a claim which Jenkins reiterated his support for in 2005, having predicted during his imprisonment at HM Prison Albany that the organisation would reorganise. Police took the possibility seriously and believed that, if MAC was not directly involved, its members were providing instruction to the arsonists, although this was never confirmed.

==== Workers' Army of the Welsh Republic ====
The Nationwide broadcast also featured an interview with Robert Griffiths, national secretary of the Welsh Socialist Republican Movement (WSRM), of which John Jenkins was also a member. The WSRM, along with a range of other left-wing organisations in Wales, became a particular point of focus for police following the broadcast. Five of the bombings associated with the 1980 campaign were later attributed by police to the WAWR, which included attacks on four Conservative Party offices and the home of the Secretary of State for Wales, Nicholas Edwards, in Crickhowell. In October 1981, the WAWR publicly claimed responsibility for a series of bombings, including a British Army recruitment office in Pontypridd and a number of offices belonging to British Steel, the National Coal Board and Severn Trent Water Authority. The latter targets were allegedly selected to protest the closure of coal and steel industries in Wales under the government of Margaret Thatcher. Police became convinced that the WAWR was operating as an armed wing of the WSRM and that membership of the organisations was inseparable. The devices used during the wave of WAWR bombings were reported to be more sophisticated than those employed in earlier attacks, and on 27 October 1981, the day after the attacks, BBC Wales and the South Wales Echo received a note which read:

The Workers' Army of the Welsh Republic has started its campaign for a free socialist Wales. We will attack all aspects of English cultural, economic and political rule including the recruitment of unemployed Welsh youth to carry out English repression in the north of Ireland and elsewhere.

==== Meibion Glyndŵr ====
The first instance of an attack being directly claimed by Meibion Glyndŵr was made on 6 February 1981, when a letter was posted from Porthmadog to the BBC office in Bangor. In the letter, the group claimed responsibility for recent attacks. Specifically, the letter referred to an attack on boats that were being kept in Penyberth near Pwllheli. To prove the authenticity of the claim, the letter provided the name of one of the boats damaged in the attack, named Mariner 111. Letters claiming responsibility for attacks by Meibion Glyndŵr were signed "Rhys Gethin", in homage to one of Owain Glyndŵr's most prominent generals. In its anonymous communications, the organisation frequently referred to English immigrants as "white settlers". In one such declaration, published by the BBC in 1989, the group stated: "Every white settler is a target. We will bury English imperialism." The same term was also used by some Scottish nationalists to describe English immigrants to Scotland and has been associated with anti-English sentiment.

=== Operation Tân ===
==== Palm Sunday arrests ====
Despite the number of arson attacks rising to as many as thirty by late March 1980, most of which were concentrated in the Llŷn Peninsula, police had failed to identify any suspects. The situation escalated after incendiary devices were discovered at Conservative Party offices in Cardiff, Shotton and Whitchurch on 28 March, prompting a major change in police strategy. Two days later, on 30 March, Special Branch and Welsh police conducted a large series of dawn raids as part of Operation Tân ('fire') in an effort to identify those responsible for the arson attacks. The coordinated raids are often referred to in relation to their timing in the early hours of Palm Sunday, also known as Sul y Blodau ('Flowering Sunday'). Using the Prevention of Terrorism Act 1976, introduced to combat terrorism stemming from the Troubles, approximately fifty individuals were arrested during the operation, most of whom were in some way associated with Welsh nationalism. The powers granted to police by the Act allowed for the detention of terror suspects for up to seven days without charge if they were suspected of belonging to or supporting a proscribed organisation. During the operation, police reportedly established roadblocks across north Wales throughout the weekend.

Among those detained were former Free Wales Army (FWA) and National Patriotic Front (NPF) organiser Gethin ap Gruffydd and his wife, Sian Ifan. Both were released two days later due to a lack of evidence linking them to the arson campaign. At the time, the couple organised Cofiwn (lit. 'we remember'), a Welsh nationalist society dedicated to commemorating historical figures and events. Others detained during the arrests included founding MAC member and Cymdeithas yr Iaith activist Emyr Llywelyn Jones, as well as John Barnard Jenkins. Robat Gruffudd, founder of the Welsh-language publisher Y Lolfa, was also detained, along with his wife Enid Gruffudd. Police were unable to secure any evidence of the Gruffudds' involvement in the arson and later released them; they were financially compensated for their time in detention.

The nature of the raids sparked controversy in Wales, leading the Welsh Campaign for Civil and Political Liberties (WCCPL) to commission a report in collaboration with a range of organisations, including Cymdeithas yr Iaith, Plaid Cymru, WSRM, Labour Party, and the International Marxist Group. Drawing from numerous witness statements, the report detailed allegations of police mistreatment and violations of civil liberties, including psychological torture, physical violence, and intimidation of detainees' family members. One account described how police interrogators had allegedly harassed the wife of a detainee:

She was asked if she really knew me and throughout her questioning felt that the police questions were designed to undermine her confidence in me as a reliable husband. She was also questioned about our sex life. She was told that all terrorists are sexually perverted, and that because I was a terrorist I must be perverted too. She was asked what method of contraception we used and if there were any vibrators around the house or any pornographic literature.

In 2005, Richie Thomas, the former head of South Wales Special Branch, publicly criticised the police approach to the Palm Sunday arrests, stating that the raids had been carried out too quickly. Thomas described the firebombing attacks targeting Conservative Party offices in Cardiff and Shotton as having "raised the level". Thomas' sentiment was echoed by former Llanelli Criminal Investigation Department (CID) head Roy Davies, who commented: "I have to say, from the absolute beginning, there was no evidence against any person I questioned - they were absolutely innocent." Leads obtained during the arrests culminated in John Jenkins' later arrest and subsequent imprisonment on 14 November 1983 for allegedly supplying Dafydd Ladd, a former member of the Angry Brigade, with the location of a safe house in Cardiff.

==== Talysarn controversy ====
In January 1982, controversy arose in Wales following claims that a couple living near the village of Talysarn in Gwynedd had witnessed two plain-clothed police officers installing bugging devices in a telephone kiosk. When confronted, the alleged officers reportedly claimed to be working for the General Post Office; however, investigations by local police revealed that the Birmingham-registered vehicle used by the men was an undercover police car. Later commenting on the affair, local MP Dafydd Wigley stated:

The secret agents were not associated with the local constabulary; they were acting without authority; and there was no process of public answerability.

The incident was satirised by folk singer Dafydd Iwan and the band Ar Log in the song "Ciosg Talysarn" (lit. 'Talysarn kiosk'), which mocked the extent of police surveillance efforts in Wales during the Meibion Glyndŵr campaign.

=== Parti Lliw Meibion Glyndŵr ===
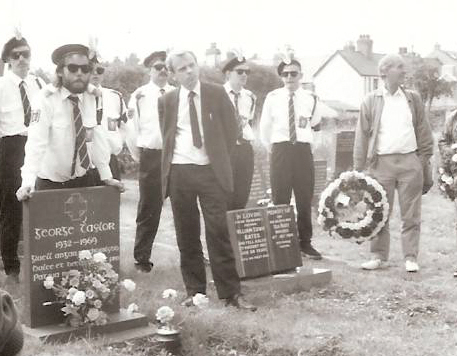
Parti Lliw Meibion Glyndŵr at the grave of George Taylor in Abergele. John Barnard Jenkins is seen holding a wreath on the right, 1989.

In July 1989, eight men wearing paramilitary uniforms marched in a procession attended by around 250 people in Abergele to commemorate the deaths of two alleged members of Mudiad Amddiffyn Cymru. The two men, named Alwyn Jones and George Taylor, who are often referred to by some Welsh nationalists as the "Abergele Martyrs", were killed when a bomb they were planting outside a Department of Health and Social Security (DHSS) office exploded prematurely on the eve of Prince Charles' investiture as the Prince of Wales in July 1969. In previous years, the occasion had been marked in Abergele with similar paramilitary displays organised by the Welsh Socialist Republican Movement and the Covenant Society of the Free Welsh, which had resulted in police warnings for the wearing of political uniforms in breach of the Public Order Act 1936. The group's uniforms bore a badge bearing the name Parti Lliw Meibion Glyndŵr (lit. 'Meibion Glyndŵr colour party') and featuring a heraldic white eagle, a symbol devised by Harri Webb that became commonly associated with radical Welsh nationalism since its popularisation by the Free Wales Army in earlier decades. Dewi Prysor and David Gareth Davies were among those within the colour party, both of whom were later arrested on suspicion of involvement with Meibion Glyndŵr and subsequently cleared. Also present was Sion Aubrey Roberts, who was the sole individual that was later convicted for involvement in the organisation.

=== Trial and imprisonment ===
A reinvestigation into postal bombings led to the conviction of Sion Aubrey Roberts in March 1993, when he was 21 years old. At the time the arson campaign began, Roberts was nine years old. Roberts was arrested by police during an armed raid on his flat in Llangefni, which had been under close surveillance by MI5 in the months leading up to the arrest. According to reports, he first attracted the attention of the authorities after attending a Welsh nationalist demonstration in Caernarfon in 1991, after which he was monitored by a task force comprising 38 MI5 officers. Charges focused on allegations that Roberts had sent four incendiary devices in the post to two senior police officers and two senior members of the Conservative Party, including Baron Roberts of Conwy.

During the eight-week trial in Caernarfon, it was revealed that MI5 officers had repeatedly broken into Roberts' flat to conduct searches and plant bugging devices in the property. Nigel Mylne, for the defence, suggested that MI5 had planted incriminating evidence in Roberts' flat, citing what he described as the authorities' frustration at failing to secure an arrest during 12 years of the arson campaign. Similar views have been expressed by prominent figures in Wales, including former Plaid Cymru president Dafydd Iwan, who has continued to maintain that the British security services were involved in the campaign in an effort to discredit Welsh nationalism. Dewi Prysor has described Iwan's stance as "fantasy", stating:

I greatly admire Dafydd, but I think he felt, as a pacifist, that the actions of Meibion Glyndŵr would damage Plaid Cymru and Welsh nationalism, so he came up with this notion that the arson campaign was planned and executed by the British state.

Iwan's claims were similarly dismissed by Keith Best, former Conservative MP for Ynys Môn, as "too fanciful to be beyond belief". In another instance, Elfyn Llwyd was mocked by Welsh Labour MP Alun Pugh for "watching too many episodes of The X-Files" after suggesting that the security services were involved in the campaign.

Roberts was ultimately found guilty and sentenced to 12 years in prison, but was released after serving 8 years in HM Prison Full Sutton. The final attack associated with Meibion Glyndŵr occurred a week after Roberts' trial, in which a Molotov cocktail was used to firebomb a holiday home named "Rose Cottage" in Gwalchmai, close to Roberts' home in Anglesey. The letters MG (for Meibion Glyndŵr) were painted on the gable of the house. Dewi Prysor later claimed that the revelation of the extent of MI5 surveillance of Roberts leading up to his arrest "put a stop to any future plans Meibion Glyndŵr had", effectively marking the end of the arson campaign.

Following his prison sentence, Roberts had continued to maintain his innocence while expressing sympathy for Meibion Glyndŵr's cause. In 2021, Roberts publicly admitted his involvement with the group to Bryn Fôn during an interview conducted as part of S4C documentary Bryn Fôn: Chwilio am Feibion Glyndŵr (Welsh for 'Bryn Fôn: Search for the Sons of Glyndŵr'). Concluding the interview, Fôn asked Roberts what he would say to a victim of the arson campaign, to which Roberts replied: "Lucky you weren't in it; don't come back here." Roberts was also interviewed by the BBC in 2023 for its Firebombers documentary, during which he reiterated his admission of involvement with Meibion Glyndŵr, citing the policies of Margaret Thatcher’s government as his motivation for turning to militant action.

== Popular support ==
At the height of the Meibion Glyndŵr arson campaign, a poll was conducted by HTV’s Welsh-language current affairs programme on S4C, Y Byd ar Bedwar ('The World on Four'). 1,195 people across Wales were questioned about their attitudes towards the campaign, and despite 69% claiming they would assist police if a local holiday home was burnt down, 57% said they supported the broader aims of the campaign. However, support for the campaign was far greater in Welsh language strongholds, where the second home issue was most obvious, and consequently 85% of respondents from Dwyfor supported the campaign. Home Office papers published by the BBC in 2017 revealed that police struggled to gather information during the campaign, "partly because there was some sympathy at present within the native Welsh community for those who sought to preserve the Welsh culture and language". The documents had been obtained via a Freedom of Information request submitted by BBC Radio Cymru's Manylu programme and contained redactions.

During the campaign, supporters of the organisation produced merchandise, such as t-shirts, badges, mugs, and posters. The Covenant Society of the Free Welsh was the most notable producer. Meibion Glyndŵr merchandise become so widespread that the director of the 1989 Dyffryn Conwy National Eisteddfod in Llanrwst warned that anyone caught selling merchandise that supported the arson campaign would be immediately banned from the event. One badge worn by supporters of the arson campaign, preserved by the British Museum, features an image of a packet of England's Glory matches with the slogan "Strike a light for Wales". Poet and Anglican priest R. S. Thomas attended a meeting of the Covenanters in Machynlleth on 16 September 1990, in which he expressed support for Meibion Glyndŵr and advocated direct action against English-owned properties in Wales. Thomas' comments drew criticism from then Plaid Cymru president Dafydd Wigley, who reportedly warned: "If we don't get it sorted out we're going down the road to Northern Ireland", referring to the Troubles. Thomas later commented in 1998, in the context of his support for the militant organisation, "What is one death against the death of the Welsh nation?" Supporters of Wrexham A.F.C. sang chants at opposing English teams glorifying the actions of the arsonists.

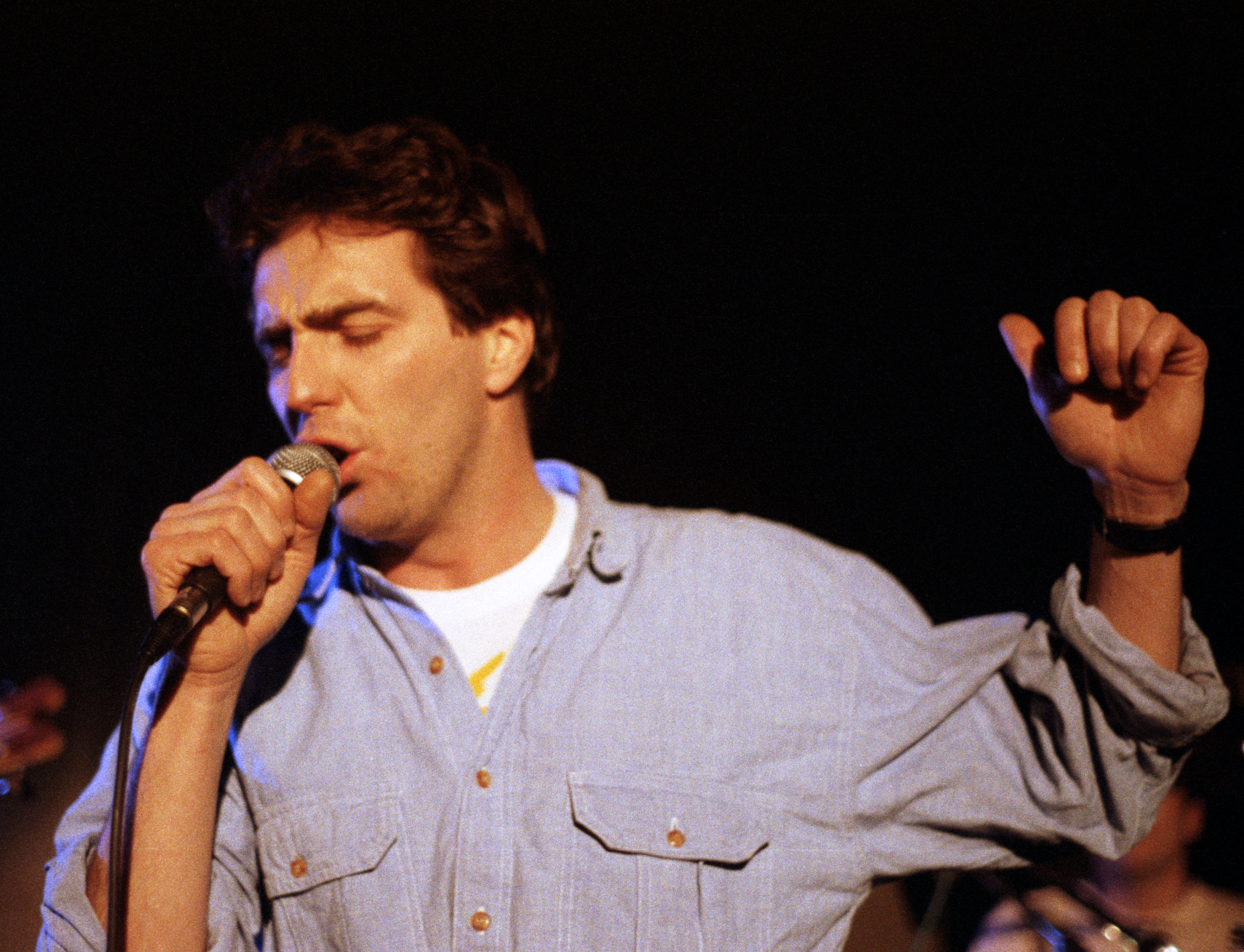
Bryn Fôn was arrested by police in connection with the arson campaign shortly after his "Meibion y Fflam" performance

Following a public appeal for witnesses on Crimewatch, Welsh actor and singer-songwriter, Bryn Fôn, wrote and performed the song "Meibion y Fflam" (lit. 'sons of the flame'), intended to belittle the police’s failed attempts at catching the arsonists. The song was released in 1989 by the band Sobin a’r Smaeliaid, of which Bryn Fôn was the lead singer. In 1990, detectives visited Fôn’s home in Llanllyfni and arrested both Bryn and his partner, Anna, after discovering a package hidden in a stone wall on his cottage’s land, which police alleged contained the components required to construct a bomb. After holding both Fôn and his partner at Dolgellau police station for 48 hours, police released both of them without charge. His C'mon Midffîld! co-star, Mei Jones, and another Welsh actor, Dyfed Thomas, were also arrested at the same time, with both being later released without charge.

Speaking on S4C's investigative Taro Naw (lit. 'hitting nine') in 2004, the former head of North Wales Police CID, Detective Chief Superintendent Gareth Jones, alleged that many within the force were sympathetic to the arsonists. Jones had been responsible for heading the police unit tasked with the investigation into Meibion Glyndŵr at the time of the firebombing campaign. Commenting on the matter, Jones stated, "There's no doubt that some police outside this unit were supportive of what was going on. I have no doubt about that, and we had to co-operate and work with those people - but nobody was open about it at the time, of course."

== Arson campaign ==
- 1979–91: Meibion Glyndŵr conducted arson attacks on 239 English-owned holiday homes.
- 18 July 1980: Welsh militants firebomb the home of Welsh Secretary of State Nicholas Edwards, in his rest house in Crickhowell, Powys. On the same day, a Conservative Party branch in Cardiff is firebombed by the group.
- 26 October 1981: An improvised device in an army recruiting office is defused in Pontypridd, prior to a visit by the Prince of Wales. Two days later another bomb is defused by authorities.
- 28 June 1987: Welsh extremists leave two improvised devices in Abergele and Porthmadog.
- 1988–89: Meibion Glyndŵr declare that "every white settler is a target". The group also places incendiary bombs in Conservative Party offices in London and estate agents' offices in London, Liverpool, Sutton Coldfield, Haverfordwest, Carmarthen and Llandeilo.
- 18 March 1989: A series of arson attacks takes place in Sutton Coldfield, Haverfordwest, Liverpool and London.
- 22 October 1989: A new ring of arson attacks begin, this time focusing on London.
- 20–21 June 1990: Four letter bombs are received. Two are addressed to the Secretary of State for Wales and the Member of Parliament for Pembroke at the House of Commons, and one of the letters slightly wounds a woman. One is addressed to the Secretary of State for Wales David Hunt, and the last to Nicholas Bennett, both of which are defused.
- 16 September 1990: R. S. Thomas calls for a campaign to deface English-owned homes.
- 26 March 1993: Sion Aubrey Roberts, a member of Meibion Glyndŵr, is jailed for twelve years for sending letter bombs to Conservative politicians.
- 1993: The week following the trial of Sion Aubrey Roberts, the final attack associated with Meibion Glyndŵr is carried out against a holiday home in Gwalchmai, Anglesey, marking the end of the campaign.

== Books ==
- Davis, William Virgil (1993) [1901-07-25]. Miraculous Simplicity: Essays on R.s. Thomas (c). University of Arkansas Press. ISBN 9781610752664 – via Google Books.
- Hill, Sarah (5 July 2017). 'Blerwytirhwng?' The Place of Welsh Pop Music. Routledge. ISBN 9781351573467 – via Google Books.
- Ledger, Robert (4 March 2021). Power and Political Economy from Thatcher to Blair: The Great Enemy of Democracy?. Routledge. ISBN 9781000352320 – via Google Books.
- Brooke, Nick (17 April 2018). Terrorism and Nationalism in the United Kingdom: The Absence of Noise. Springer. ISBN 9783319765419 – via Google Books.
- Henken, Elissa R. (25 July 1996). National Redeemer: Owain Glyndŵr in Welsh Tradition. Cornell University Press. ISBN 0801483492 – via Google Books.
- Berger, Matthias D. (18 July 2023). National Medievalism in the Twenty-First Century: Switzerland and Britain. Boydell & Brewer. ISBN 9781843846574 – via Google Books.
