= Operation Tân =

Operation Tân (Welsh pronunciation: [ˈtɑːn], "Fire") was the name of a series of police raids in Wales between 1 October 1979 and 30 September 1980. The aim of the operation was to identify members of Meibion Glyndŵr, a militant Welsh nationalist group responsible for burning English-owned holiday homes in the Welsh countryside.

In the backdrop of the Meibion Glyndwr arson campaign, the efforts of the British state to ascertain those responsible for the attacks had remained fruitless. In a move that has been criticised as a more generalised trawl of left and nationalist milieux within Wales, the authorities enacted a series arrests against those believed to be responsible or in knowledge of the perpetrators of the campaign.

The overseer of Operation Tân was the head of Dyfed-Powys Police, who controversially forbade detained suspects from accessing legal counsel under the provisions of the Prevention of Terrorism Act 1974. The Welsh Campaign for Civil and Political Liberties would give voice to those rounded up during Operation Tân.

== Palm Sunday ==
The largest series of police raids occurred on 30 March 1980; now often referred to as the "Palm Sunday arrests" in which around 50 individuals targeted based upon their political affiliations.

John Jenkins, Emyr Llywelyn Jones and Owain Williams, all former members of the Mudiad Amddiffyn Cymru, were rounded up by the authorities. Beside a number suspects being prominent militant nationalists, many more arrested had no role in direct-action politics. Members of Mudiad Adfer (Restoration Movement) and Cofwin (literally "remember") were targeted by the raids, as were Robat and Enid Gruffudd, founders of Welsh-language publisher Y Lolfa, for what would be an apparent gathering of intelligence on both nationalists and left-wing activities.

Substantial accusations of political policing were made against the state and authorities, with arrests being seen as a purge of left-wing activists due to those arrested claiming that their membership of organisations such as the Welsh Socialist Republican Movement (WSRM) and Plaid Cymru, as well as their stance on the Conservative Party, took precedent over any affiliation with the burnings.
