= Tromode =

Coordinates: 54.168°N 4.490°W

- Location within the Isle of Man
- Parish: Braddan
- Sheading: Middle
- Crown dependency: Isle of Man
- Post town: Isle of Man
- Police: Isle of Man
- Fire: Isle of Man
- Ambulance: Isle of Man
- Website: Tromode, Isle of Man Gazeteer

Tromode is a village in Braddan parish, Isle of Man. It is on the boundary with and partly within the borough of Douglas, and is within the Douglas conurbation.

During the period of Manx nationalism, Ny Troor Tromode ("The Tromode Three") committed acts of arson and vandalism on the island.

== Notable residents ==
- Kate Costain, politician
- Archibald Knox (1864–1933), pioneer of Manx Art Nouveau
