= Operation Tan =

Operation Tan may refer to:

- Operation Tân, a series of police raids in Wales in 1979–1980
- Operation Tan No. 2, a Japanese kamikaze attack again the American fleet anchorage at Ulithi Atoll in 1945
