= Irree Magh =

Defunct Manx nationalist organisation

- Country: Isle of Man
- Ideology: Manx nationalism

Irree Magh (Manx: "Rebellion" or "Insurrection") was a militant Manx nationalist group. In 1975 it distributed leaflets calling for the expulsion of "come-overs" (Manx term for immigrants) and Manx Independence. The group called for "open rebellion in order to preserve our nation, heritage and country (or what's left of it)".

== See also ==
- Fo Halloo, another Manx militant organisation
- Ny Troor Tromode
- FSFO
