= Fo Halloo =

Defunct Manx militant nationalist organisation

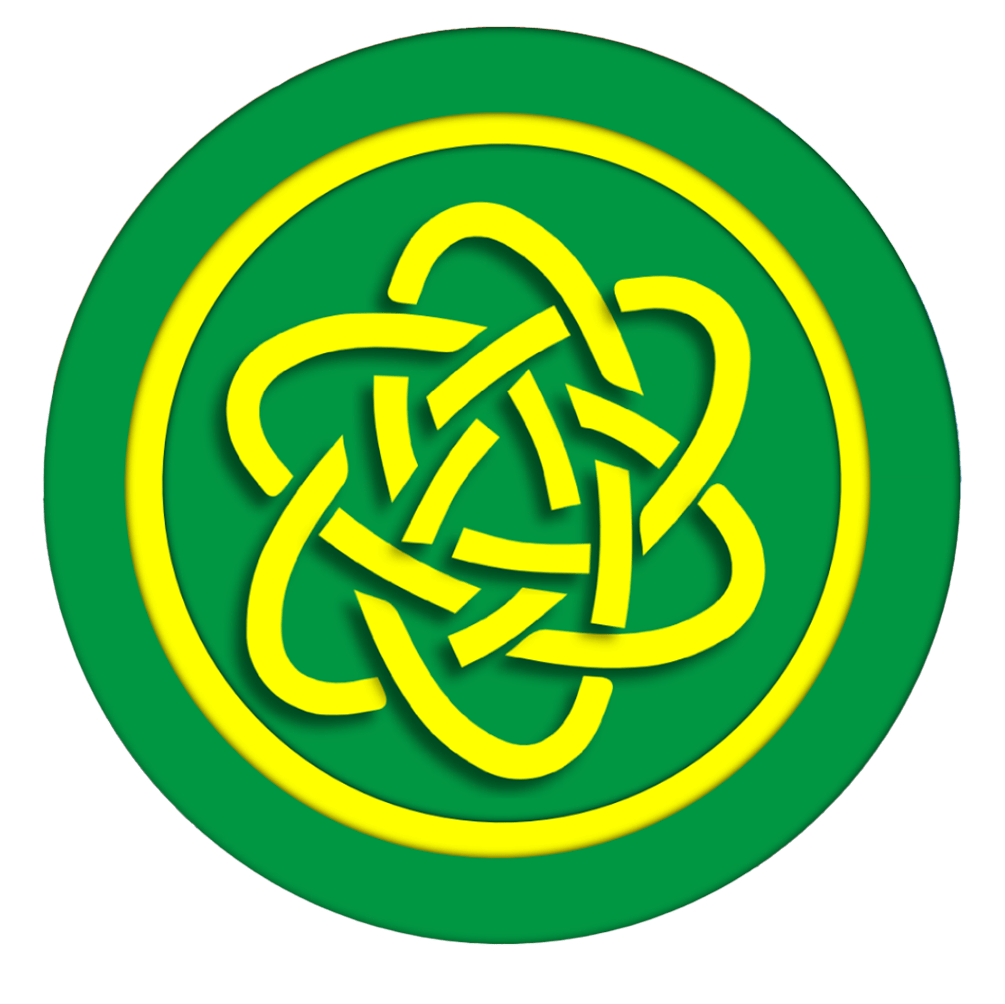
- Dates active: 1970s
- Country: Isle of Man
- Ideology: Manx nationalism

Fo Halloo (Manx: "Underground") was a militant Manx nationalist group active on the Isle of Man in the 1970s. The group conducted Manx graffiti and poster campaigns, published and distributed newsletters, and was also accused of conducting a number of arson attacks against the homes of English, non-Manx residents.

An implication that the Celtic League was involved in the "Manx underground" activities was published by The Guardian in 1976; a refutation from the League chairman was eventually published a month later after ongoing efforts by the League.

== See also ==
- Irree Magh, another Manx militant organisation
- Ny Troor Tromode
- FSFO
