= Mudiad Amddiffyn Cymru =

1963–1969 Welsh nationalist terrorist group

- Movement for the Defence of Wales
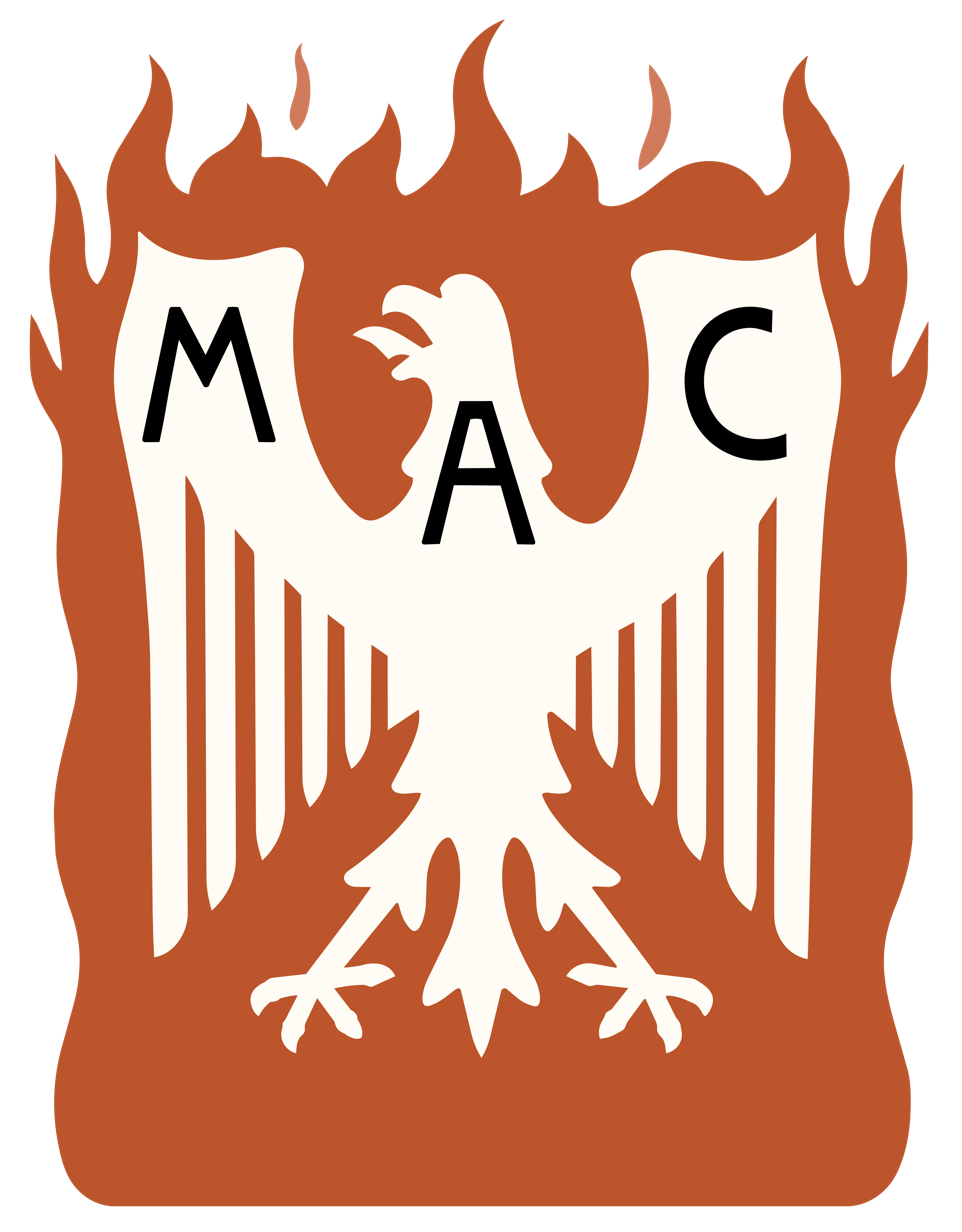
- Reconstruction of an unofficial MAC symbol displayed by demonstrators protesting the Category A status of John Jenkins' imprisonment on 13 November 1972
- Other name: MAC
- Founders: Owain Williams; Emyr Llywelyn Jones; John Albert Jones
- Founding leader: Owain Williams
- Director of Operations: John Barnard Jenkins
- Policy Adviser: Harri Webb
- Dates active: 1962-1969
- Headquarters: Wrexham, Denbighshire
- Active regions: Wales, England
- Ideology: Welsh nationalism Welsh republicanism

Mudiad Amddiffyn Cymru (pronounced [ˈmɨːdjad amˈðiːfɨn ˈkəmrɨ]; lit. 'movement for the defence of Wales'; MAC) was a paramilitary Welsh nationalist organisation, which was responsible for a number of bombing incidents between 1963 and 1969. The group's activities primarily targeted infrastructure transporting water to the English cities of Birmingham and Liverpool, in addition to the investiture of Prince Charles as Prince of Wales.

== History ==
=== MAC 1 ===
==== Tryweryn ====
The first iteration of MAC was established in 1962 at Owain Williams' café in Pwllheli, Gwynedd. After two years of working as a cattle rancher in Canada, Williams returned to his family farm near Nefyn on the Llŷn Peninsula in 1959. On his return, he had become radicalised by Plaid Cymru's failure to prevent the flooding of Tryweryn, which was being planned by Liverpool Corporation with the intention of constructing a reservoir supplying water to the city. Williams' father helped him to purchase a mortgage on the Espresso Bar and Grill in Pwllheli, which quickly became a meeting spot for Welsh nationalists. It was from the café that Williams would first recruit Robert Williams, from Criccieth, and Edwin Pritchard, from Nefyn. On 15 October 1962, the three young men raided a granite quarry near Llithfaen to steal explosives from the site. However, the trio discovered upon their return to the café that they had only succeeded in acquiring hundreds of detonators, which they promptly hid across the local area.

Following the raid on the quarry, Williams determined that his two accomplices were not suitable for his plans and would crack under police interrogation. He subsequently recruited two new accomplices: John Albert Jones, a former officer in the Royal Air Force Police from Wrexham, and Emyr Llywelyn Jones, a well-connected student at University College Wales. Together, the three planned to attack the Tryweryn construction site with explosives. Williams and John Albert Jones initially planned an ambitious strike at ten locations across the site; however, Emyr Llywelyn preferred a more symbolic protest, akin to the Tân yn Llŷn (Welsh for 'fire in Llŷn') protest at Penyberth in 1936. The trio agreed on Emyr Llywelyn's suggestion and began reconnoitring the construction site throughout the harsh winter of January 1963. It was decided that they would attempt to destroy the transformer powering the site on the evening of 9 February 1963. Upon agreeing on their plans, the three men swore the oath of Mudiad Amddiffyn Cymru, which read:

I promise to keep the activities of the movement and the names of the members secret; I promise neither to kill nor to injure any man who as part of his duty attempts to prevent me and I will do everything in my power to ensure that no one is injured or killed as a result of any act on my part. I promise not to undertake any positive act without consulting the other members of the movement.

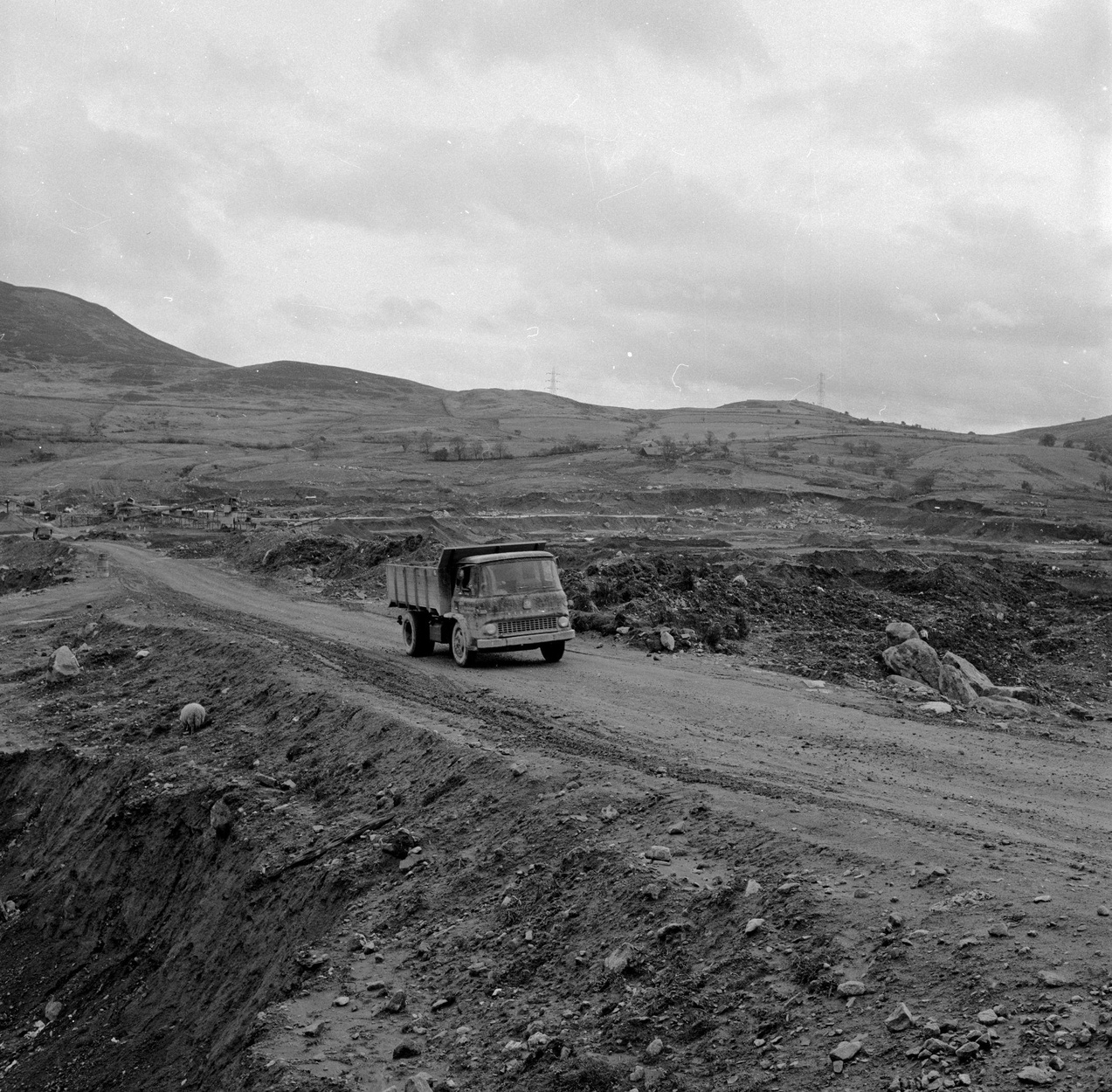
Dump truck transports material at the Llyn Celyn construction site, 14 November 1963

Leading up to the day of the attack, accomplices of the group in Pembrokeshire had stolen gelignite from a colliery, supplying the necessary explosive material. Similarly, Dai Pritchard, a draughtsman from New Tredegar, had acquired a Venner time switch to use as a timer. Pritchard had been fined for attempting to damage the same transformer the year prior and possessed both the necessary technical knowledge and, in addition, links with the Irish Republican Army (IRA). With the gelignite and timer in his possession, Pritchard travelled north to supply the three saboteurs with the assembled explosive device and provided a demonstration with a small blast on a beach near Pwllheli. On the night of the operation, Wales was gripped by the coldest winter since 1740. The saboteurs pressed on with their plan regardless, even despite Owain Williams' wife, Irene, being rushed to hospital in Bangor with pregnancy complications shortly beforehand. The trio met at their planned rendezvous point in Pwllheli, from where Emyr Llywelyn drove them in a rented red Vauxhall Victor towards the target. Most of the roads in the area surrounding the dam construction site were closed due to snow and ice, with only the A494 between Bala and Dolgellau remaining open.

Shortly after passing Dolgellau, a rear tyre popped, causing the sabouteurs' car to skid across the road. Fearing being spotted, the men pushed the car off-road so they could replace the tyre; however, they discovered that they had no jack, requiring two of them to lift the car with their hands. Having replaced the tyre, the group continued on to Cwmtirmynach, from where they hiked across a section of the snow-covered Arenig mountains using a sheep track. As they approached the transformer, the saboteurs were forced to drop to the ground and crawl through the snow for hundreds of yards, leaving a trail behind them. The three narrowly succeeded in avoiding the six guards present at the site and planted the bomb beneath the transformer, which was set to detonate at 3:15 a.m. After rigging the bomb to explode, the group fled back into the mountains and escaped to the rented car in Cwmtirmynach. However, Emyr had badly injured his leg on barbed wire while clambering over a wall and was bleeding, preventing him from driving. Attempting to stem the bleeding from his leg wound, Emyr used his handkerchief embroidered with the initial 'E' to apply pressure, but he later dropped it near the scene during the group's escape.

With Emyr Llywelyn unable to drive, Williams took the responsibility. The icy conditions proved too severe for Williams, who skidded the car into a snowdrift on the road approaching Cerrigydrudion while attempting to pass a van that had done the same. The trio panicked as the driver of the van approached their car, and Williams attempted to pass himself off as an Englishman by asking, in a feigned English accent, "I say, old boy, do you know if this road goes anywhere?" The young van driver, Hugh Roberts from Cwmtirmynach, was suspicious of the "Englishmen" and replied, "No, it's closed; I'm stuck, too, you see." In Williams' autobiography, he recounted how he had told his two accomplices to let him do the talking before referring to them both as Charles and Steve while instructing them to help push the van in the presence of the driver. After pushing both the van and the Vauxhall out of the snow, the trio hastily drove off back in the direction of Bala, as Williams had boxed himself into a corner with his English persona. Intent on maintaining the masquerade as he departed, Williams shouted from the window of the car, "Blast these Welsh roads; I'll be glad to get back over the border, old boy!"

Despite the charade, Roberts' handprints were left imprinted on the car, and the three had all left footprints at the scene. In spite of all of the setbacks the saboteurs had faced during the operation, the bomb detonated just as planned and completely cut off power to the construction site in the early hours of Sunday, 10 February. However, with a wealth of evidence left at the scene and a witnessed rental car, the police swiftly identified and arrested Emyr Llywelyn Jones at his flat in Aberystwyth on the evening of 18 February, just over a week after the bombing.

==== Gellilydan ====
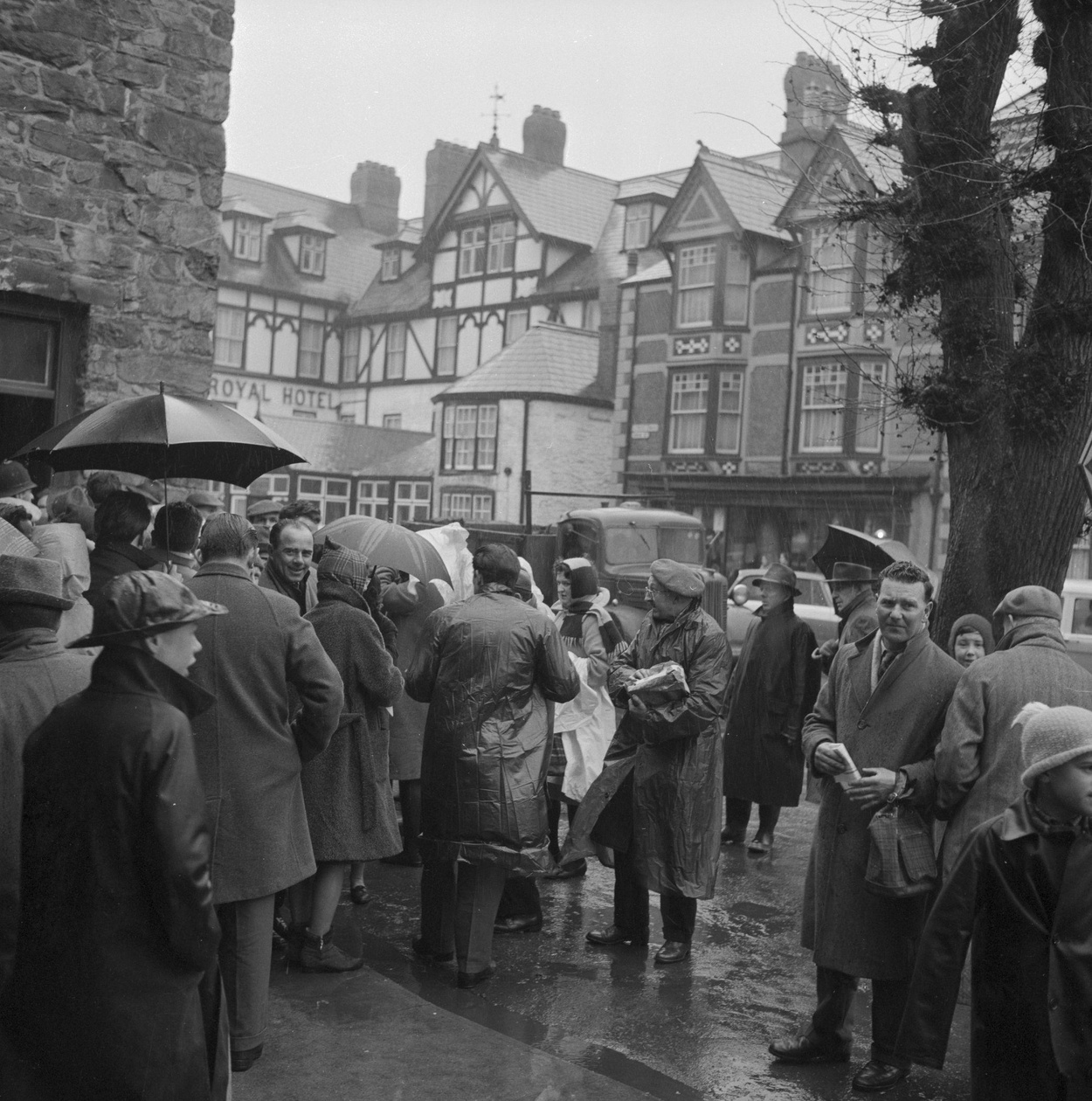
Crowds gather in front of Bala Magistrates' Court to show support for Emyr Llywelyn Jones on trial, 14 March 1963

In accordance with the oath the trio had sworn before undertaking the sabotage, Emyr Llywelyn Jones refused to disclose his accomplices' identities during interrogation and hindered police efforts to identify them. Police searches of Emyr Llywelyn’s flat uncovered evidence including maps and photographs of the Tryweryn area, manuals relating to explosives, and correspondence with individuals in Ireland. Arresting officer Sergeant Glanmor Hughes stated that the evidence discovered amounted to what one "might expect to be in the possession of a person intent, or guilty, of having caused an explosion". On 21 February, Emyr Llywelyn appeared before the court in Bala to answer the charges against him and was represented by W. R. P. George, a nephew of former Prime Minister David Lloyd George. The courtroom was reported to be full, with many attendees present to show support for Jones, including a bus carrying sixty students from Aberystwyth.

W. R. P. George argued that the bombing was not “a criminal act in the common sense of the word”, a submission permitted by the chair of the bench and reported at the time to have caused concern among police. The chair subsequently ordered that the defendant be released on bail in his own recognisance of £100, on condition that he reappear in court on 14 March and reside at his family home in Llandysul in the interim. The trial received extensive sympathetic coverage in Welsh-language publications, including Baner ac Amserau Cymru. During a BBC Wales programme, Plaid Cymru president Gwynfor Evans stated that those responsible for the attack had his “full respect, sympathy and moral support”. Emyr Llywelyn’s trial continued in Bala throughout March, during which a range of forensic evidence and witness statements was presented to the court. Among the witnesses called to give evidence was Hugh Roberts, who had witnessed the trio in the snowdrift on the night of the attack. Roberts received threats after providing evidence in the trial and later recalled to the BBC in 2023, “I wish I hadn't had seen them, but I didn't have a choice. I was here at the wrong time.” On 29 March 1963, Emyr Llywelyn was summoned for sentencing at the Carmarthenshire Assizes, where he was convicted and sentenced to one year's imprisonment for his involvement in the bombing of the transformer.

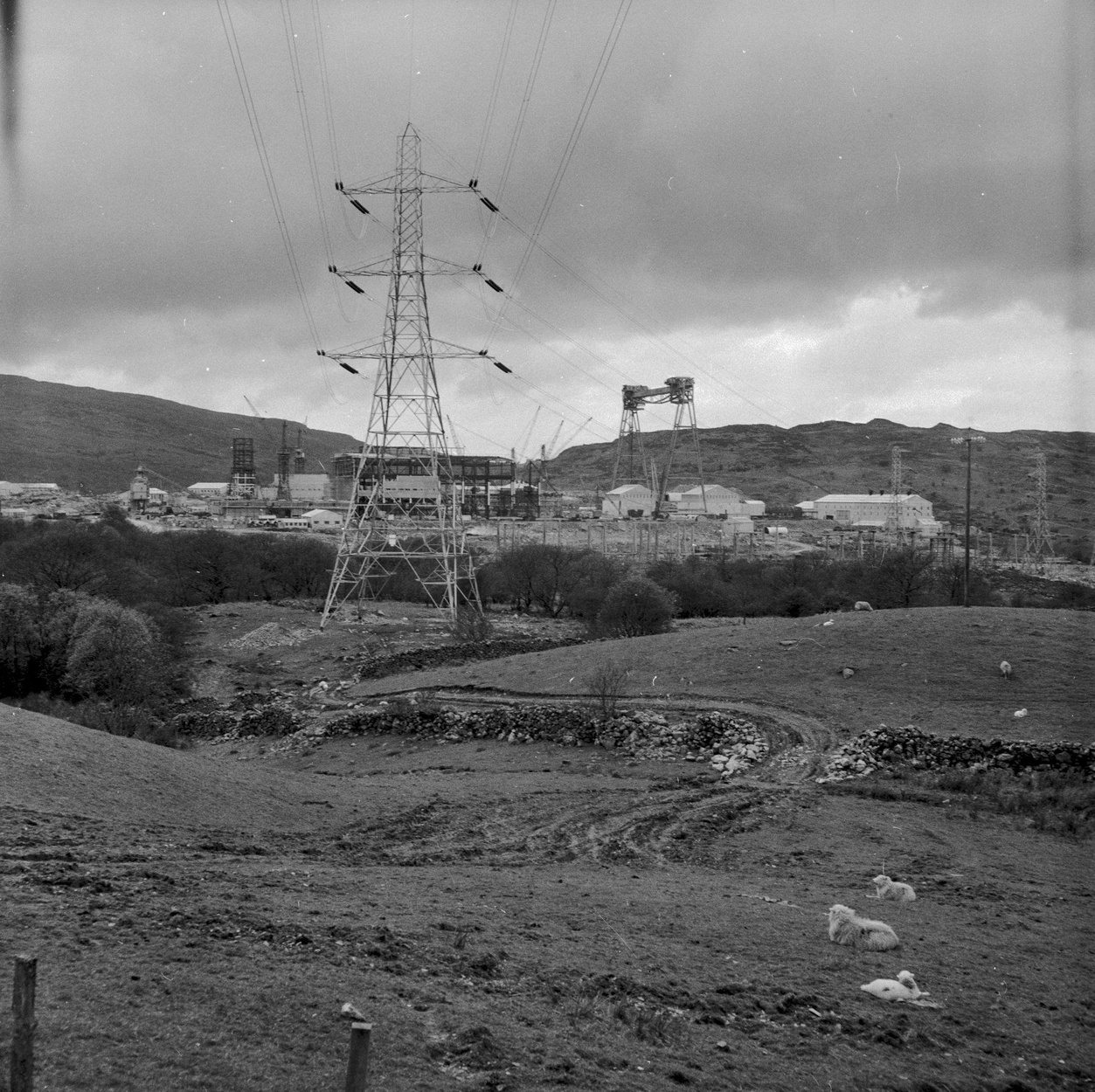
Trawsfynydd nuclear power station under construction, photographed in 1961

On 31 March 1963, shortly after Emyr Llywelyn's sentencing, Owain Williams and John Albert Jones attempted to destroy an electricity pylon near the village of Gellilydan in protest. The pylon was located just two miles from the Trawsfynydd nuclear power station construction site, and the two men believed it connected to the Tryweryn construction site through Blaenau Ffestiniog. Given the pylon's close proximity to the village, the pair feared that a timed device would endanger any unaware locals, requiring them to detonate the explosives manually. It was also deemed too dangerous by the pair to attempt to acquire a new timing device. Despite planting gelignite explosives at the base of each of the pylon's four supports, only the first bomb successfully detonated, as its detonation destroyed the electrical circuit necessary to trigger the subsequent blasts. This resulted in the pylon failing to collapse as intended and simultaneously alerted the surrounding area of the attack. The saboteurs were forced to quickly escape the scene before they could be caught. While the pair escaped uncaught, the attack instigated fresh police investigations, which succeeded in turning up Williams' earlier accomplices from the Llithfaen quarry raid, Robert Williams and Edwin Pritchard.

==== Trial and imprisonment ====
Following the arrest of Owain’s two earlier associates, statements were obtained that implicated him and directed police to his café in Pwllheli. This ultimately led to the arrest and conviction of both Owain Williams and John Albert Jones for their role in the bombings. Williams was the first to be arrested on 7 April 1963 and later claimed that police sought to coerce a confession by confronting him with his crying children, relating to the quarry raid, the transformer bombing, and the Gellilydan bombing. A police search of Williams’ flat uncovered a copy of the movement’s oath, newspaper clippings relating to the Tryweryn bombing and Emyr Llywelyn’s trial, and a homemade Free Wales Army (FWA) poster.

John Albert Jones was arrested by police at his sister’s home in Penrhyndeudraeth the following morning. A subsequent search uncovered similar items of evidence, including Korean War boots that were reported to match footprints found at the scene of the transformer bombing. At a court hearing in Pwllheli on 8 April, Williams and his two accomplices in the quarry raid were charged with the theft of thousands of detonators. While his accomplices were granted bail, Williams was remanded in custody and required to appear before another court in Blaenau Ffestiniog on the morning of 9 April on a charge under Section II of the Explosive Substances Act 1883. Robert Williams and Edwin Pritchard were later fined £25 and £40 respectively for their involvement in the theft of detonators, thereby avoiding custodial sentences.

Proceedings against John Albert Jones and Owain Williams continued before the Blaenau Ffestiniog magistrates for several months, after which their case was committed to the Meirionnydd Assizes in June, following the court's examination of 32 witnesses and 54 exhibits. On 14 June, both men pleaded guilty to the charges before them in Dolgellau. Judge Elwes sentenced Jones to three years’ probation, while Williams was granted bail and summoned for sentencing at the Denbighshire Assizes on 1 July, owing to his young daughter requiring brain surgery in Liverpool. Judge Elwes expressed sympathy for Williams and initially intended to impose a non-custodial sentence; however, media coverage of this decision provoked criticism, with outlets attacking the judge for his perceived leniency toward the saboteurs. Following the public criticism, Williams was subsequently sentenced to one year’s imprisonment on 1 July 1963, the same sentence previously handed down to Emyr Llywelyn Jones.

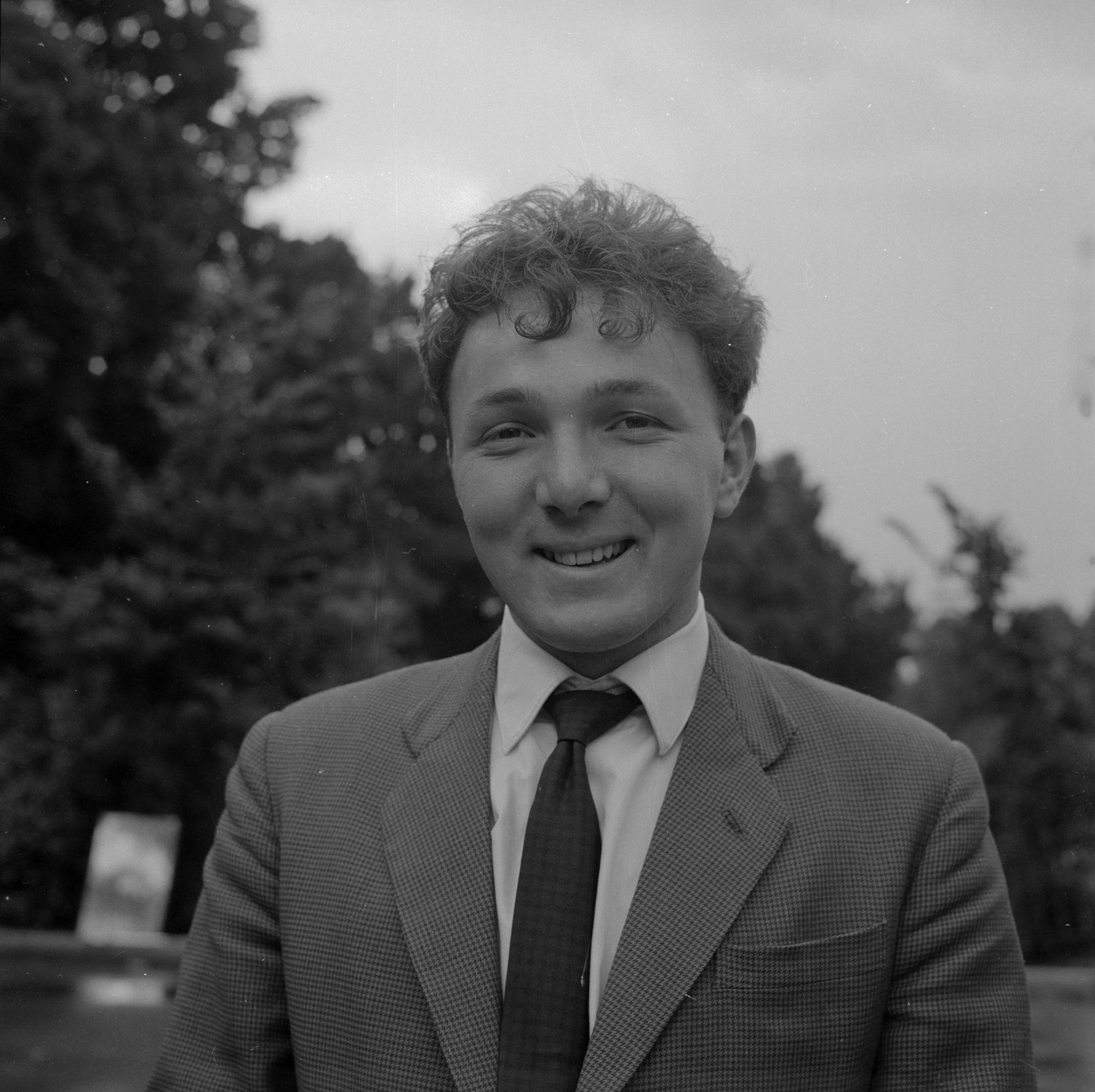
Emyr Llywelyn Jones photographed near the time of his release from prison, 21 November 1963

Following his release from prison in December 1963, Emyr Llywelyn Jones publicly renounced violence and dismissed claims that young people in Wales were joining the ranks of the Free Wales Army. Jones later became the chairman of Cymdeithas yr Iaith Gymraeg (Welsh Language Society), during whose chairmanship the movement passed a motion committing itself to non-violent direct action in support of the Welsh language. Owain Williams, who was still serving his prison sentence at the time, later stated that he felt betrayed by Jones' decision, commenting that "he should have kept them [his thoughts] private." Recounting the situation to Wyn Thomas in 2004, Williams suggested that Emyr Llywelyn's Nonconformist upbringing was responsible for his pacifism, and stated that it was at odds with his and John Albert Jones' working-class backgrounds. Williams also implied that Emyr Llywelyn's family were involved, alleging that he had been "groomed from the cradle to be a martyr" by his father, T. Llew Jones; a claim which Emyr Llywelyn strongly rejected. While imprisoned, Williams was held between a convicted rapist and a murderer, and while he generally received letters of support, he claimed that one letter read: "I wish your baby was dead. She would be better off than having a lunatic like you for a father", anonymously signed by a "Liverpool doctor". He was released from prison in April 1964.

=== MAC 2 ===
==== Clywedog ====
Following a pause of militant activity in Wales, the Clywedog Reservoir construction site in Montgomeryshire was bombed on 6 March 1966. The explosion destroyed the site's overhead cableway, known as "Blondin", named in homage to the French tightrope walker Charles Blondin. Damage sustained during the bombing amounted to £30,000 and delayed construction of the reservoir by six months. When completed, the dam was planned to supply up to 100 million gallons of water to the River Severn, from which water could be abstracted downstream to supply the West Midlands in England. In order to enable construction of the reservoir, four farms were evicted from the Clywedog valley in return for financial compensation and limited investment in local road infrastructure. Given the continuing anger in Wales over the flooding of Tryweryn, Plaid Cymru established a committee tasked with opposing plans for the Clywedog Reservoir, which embarked on a scheme to hinder the project in April 1963.

At the time, land laws stipulated that all leaseholders must be allowed to voice opposition to a corporation's purchase at a public inquiry, regardless of whether they resided on the land in question. Furthermore, the law afforded leaseholders the legal right to prevent trespassers from accessing the land. Using this law, the Plaid Cymru committee encouraged hundreds of opponents of the project to lease land in the Clwyedog valley in an effort to oppose the purchase; John Barnard Jenkins was among them. At the time, Jenkins was living in Wrexham while stationed at Saighton Camp, near Chester, as a sergeant in the Royal Army Dental Corps (RADC). Jenkins had previously served in the British Army during the Cyprus Emergency, where he became impressed by the guerrilla campaign waged by the National Organisation of Cypriot Fighters (EOKA) against British rule on the island. In response to the scheme, Parliament passed the Clywedog Reservoir Joint Authority Act 1963 on 31 July, which circumvented all requirements for leaseholders to be consulted. The incident proved to be a pivotal moment in Jenkins' radicalisation, and he later stated:

They simply changed the law, which had been in place to offer a landowner protection and the opportunity to voice their concerns on such a takeover. This was the final thing which convinced me that constitutionally speaking, you can't win against people who own all the judicial eventualities. These people make the law and if you interfere with it, however unjust that law may be, you are breaking the law. Yet they can amend it in their favour as they wish. So while they can simply circumvent or change a law to suit their political objective, how can you conduct a fight, and campaign against them legally? You can't, because they own the whole of the legal system.

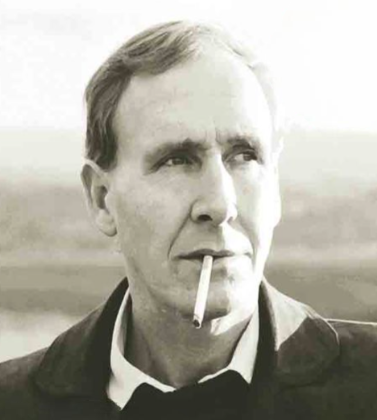
John Barnard Jenkins assumed leadership of the organisation in the years following the Clywedog Reservoir bombing

John Jenkins claimed that he was only peripherally involved with MAC at the time of the Clywedog bombing, having become involved in late 1964 through his association with Dai Pritchard and David Walters. Walters, who aided Pritchard in damaging the transformer at Tryweryn in 1962, later stated that Pritchard, Trefor Beasley and Alf Williams were responsible for the bombing. John Humphries described this second iteration of the organisation, which emerged from the Clywedog sabotage, as "MAC 2", distinguishing it from "MAC 1", which had been involved in the Tryweryn and Gellilydan bombings.

While the saboteurs were never identified, the attack prompted a major police investigation, during which between 200 and 300 individuals were questioned. Police discovered an olive-green patrol cap near the site of the bombing featuring the phrase "Gorchfygwn" (Welsh for 'we shall overcome') and the "White Eagle of Snowdonia", the adopted symbol of the Free Wales Army. The cap was believed to have been deliberately planted at the scene to mislead police investigators. Following a Plaid Cymru conference in Caersws, detectives allegedly approached Gwynfor Evans and asked him to try on the cap. Maureen Huws, a mother from Brynteg on Anglesey, accused police of attempting to recruit her as an informant during the investigation.

Lyn Ebenezer, an associate of the FWA, was subjected to a police raid and interrogation in connection with the bombing, but was cleared of involvement. Leads obtained during the investigation resulted in the arrests of Owen Pennant Hughes of Nebo, Marcus Gale of Llangollen and Harry Jones of Wrexham. All three were convicted of the possession of explosives under suspicious circumstances and were required to renounce their associations with the FWA, but were ultimately cleared of involvement in the bombing. The following year, in February 1967, a bomb manufactured by John Jenkins was secretly delivered to Dennis Coslett and the FWA for use in a planned attack on the Fron Aqueduct, which connected the Elan Valley Reservoirs to Birmingham, near Crossgates. According to Coslett, the device failed to detonate due to a priming error and was subsequently discovered and destroyed by the British Army. Following the incident, Jenkins reportedly concluded that the FWA should not be entrusted with another device, later commenting to Wyn Thomas, "They made a mess of it."

==== Llanrhaeadr-ym-Mochnant ====
The leadership of the organisation was later taken over by John Jenkins. Jenkins assumed the title of "Director of Operations" within the organisation's "Supreme Council", which reportedly consisted of five members. One of his first actions was to prohibit further cooperation with the Free Wales Army, which he described as "top of the shit parade". At this stage, Owain Williams remained involved in the movement, albeit in a supporting role under Jenkins, owing to his high public profile. As part of a restructuring of the movement, Jenkins implemented a cell structure with himself at its centre. The true number of cells within the organisation was never disclosed, although John Humphries suggested that there were at least five in north Wales, one in south-east Wales and another in south-west Wales. Describing this system, Jenkins stated:

In each cell only the cell leader knew me, and then only by sight, not my name, where I lived or anything else. I vetted every recruit personally and trained each cell leader personally. They were then left to recruit their own people. If there was a job, I would call unannounced, give the leader the target and the stuff, leaving him to organise the rest.

Forming his own local cell in the Wrexham area, Jenkins recruited Frederick Ernest Alders, also known as "Ernie" Alders, a young cadet in the Territorial Army from Rhosllanerchrugog. Alders joined the drum and fife band of the Royal Welch Fusiliers, where Jenkins served as the drum instructor. During their time in the band, Jenkins vetted Alders and tested his Welsh nationalist convictions before deciding to recruit him into the organisation. Alders' involvement was reportedly confirmed one evening when Jenkins required him to swear an oath of allegiance to MAC before revealing a gelignite device stored in the boot of his car, which was parked at Hightown Barracks. Having previously worked at Gresford Colliery, Alders recognised the gelignite and knew it was genuine. The device had been supplied to Jenkins by Dai Pritchard in Rhayader shortly beforehand, and it was allegedly assembled by Alf Williams. Williams, from Maesycwmmer, had been trained in the handling of explosives during his service in the British Army.

Only days after recruiting Alders, Jenkins and Alders carried out their first act of sabotage on 30 September 1967, targeting a pipe carrying water from Lake Vyrnwy to Liverpool near Llanrhaeadr-ym-Mochnant. The pair met at Alders' car outside the barracks on the evening of the attack, after Jenkins had initially remained in the sergeants' mess to establish an alibi. After driving to Llanrhaeadar-ym-Mochnant from Wrexham, the pair planted the device between the pipeline and a concrete support, setting it to detonate at 2:00 a.m. the following morning. Within two hours of having set off, Jenkins was back in the sergeant's mess in Wrexham, where he later claimed to have finished his pint. He later described the experience as "wholly unnerving", stating that he had been distressed that it had "actually come to this".

The device exploded as intended, tearing a substantial hole in the pipeline and generating widespread media coverage. No suspects were identified, but Alders had disclosed his involvement to his then girlfriend, Ann Woodgate, allegedly prompting an argument with Jenkins. Owain Williams later attributed the organisation's arrests to Woodgate, although Jenkins disputed this claim. Ostensibly to distance Plaid Cymru from the Free Wales Army, the party issued a press statement describing the attack as a "stupid action" and suggesting that it was likely the work of the IRA; the FWA had claimed responsibility for the bombing.

==== Temple of Peace ====
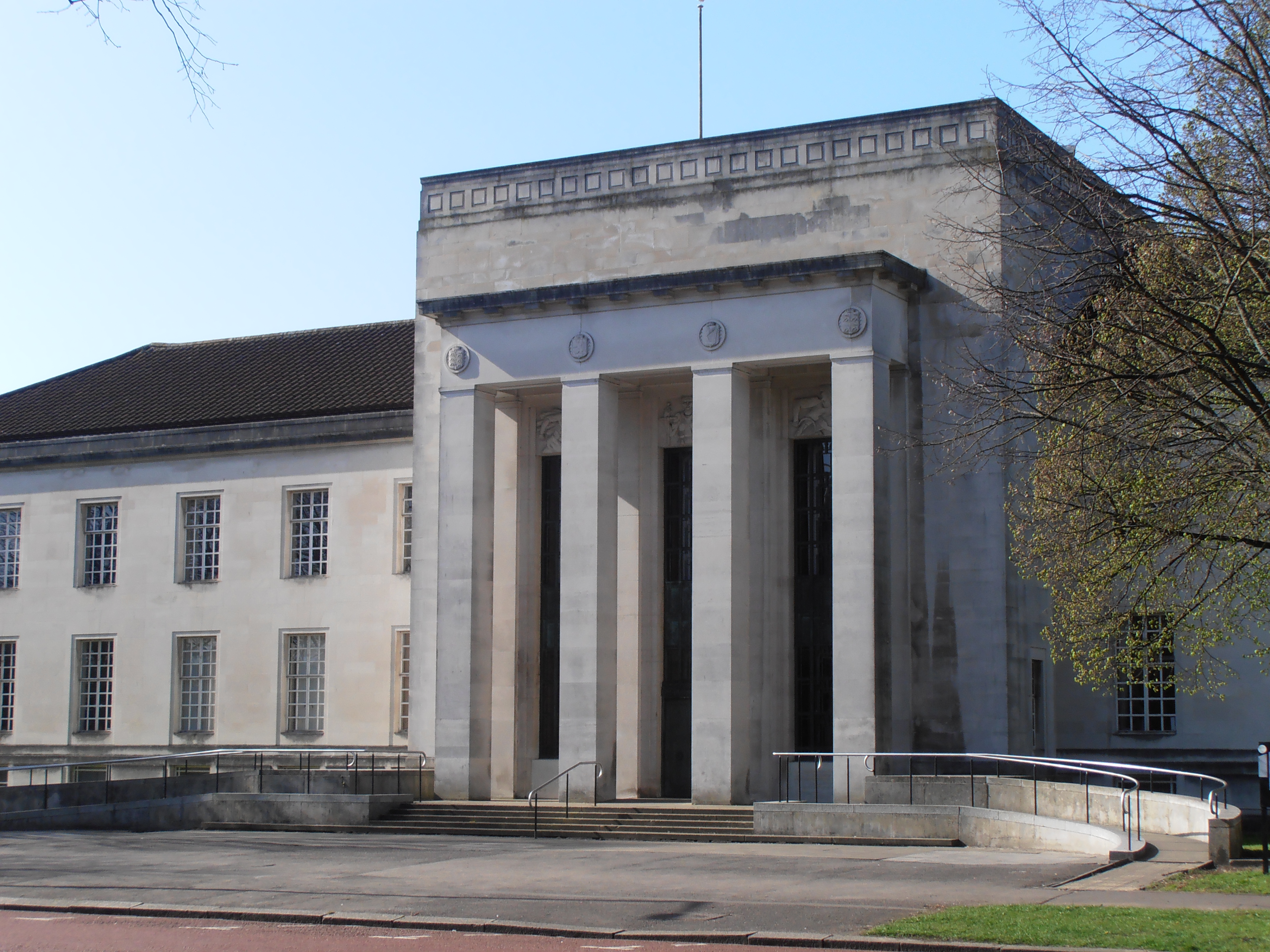
The Temple of Peace in Cathays Park was targeted the evening before the first meeting of the investiture planning committee

Months after the Llanrhaeadr-ym-Mochnant bombing, MAC carried out a bombing at the Temple of Peace and Health in Cardiff on 17 November 1967. The building was targeted because it was being used by Lord Snowdon and civil servants as the venue for the first planning committee meeting for the forthcoming investiture of Prince Charles as Prince of Wales. The device, planted at the entrance of the building, detonated at 4:00 a.m. and was estimated by bomb disposal experts to have contained approximately 20 lb of gelignite. This was the first strike in a long-term strategy devised by John Jenkins, under which a bomb would be detonated on every occasion that a member of the British royal family visited Wales. No suspects were ever identified, but Jenkins later claimed that the attack had been carried out by a south Wales cell of MAC. An anonymous MAC member told Wyn Thomas that the attack "had all the hallmarks of a Dave Pritchard action", although John Jenkins and David Walters declined to confirm whether this was the case. Similarly, Gethin ap Gruffydd declined to confirm the claim that a member of the National Patriotic Front (NPF) had been involved in the attack.

Despite the damage caused by the blast, the committee meeting proceeded the following day; however, the attack caused serious concern among government and security officials. Roadblocks were set up by police on all roads leading into Cardiff immediately following the bombing. An anti-investiture demonstration organised by Cymdeithas yr Iaith Gymraeg and the National Patriotic Front also proceeded, resulting in a scuffle with police and numerous arrests. Members of the NPF, including Gethin ap Gruffydd and Toni Lewis, were among those arrested, as was Emyr Llywelyn Jones, who was then a member of Cymdeithas yr Iaith. Jones was accused of using "obscene language" towards a police officer and was subsequently fined, although he maintained his innocence. Jenkins later conceded that the target had been deliberately chosen to provoke a heavy-handed police response to the protestors, demonstrating that the British state could be "very, very nasty when it wanted to be".

==== Penisa'r Waun ====
On 5 January 1968, MAC carried out a bombing at the Snowdonia Country Club in Penisa'r Waun, Gwynedd. The blast, which occurred at 4:50 a.m., was reportedly smaller than usual and was intended as a symbolic protest against the venue while avoiding harm to its owner, who lived next door. John Jenkins stated that the attack had been carried out in opposition to the "cultural rape" of Wales, as the nightclub had been established in the small village by Manchester businessman Jack Nix, allegedly to the distaste of local residents. Nix was also reportedly selling square-yard plots of land in Snowdonia to tourists at the time. Jenkins later attributed the attack to Alwyn Jones and George Taylor, who remained uncaught; however, both men were later killed during an attempted bombing in Abergele on the eve of the investiture in 1969.

While Jones and Taylor were never identified as the perpetrators of the Penisa'r Waun bombing, police investigators arrested Edward Hope Wilkinson and Robert Griffith Jones, both of whom were known Welsh nationalists in the area. Searches of the men's homes in Llanllyfni and Groeslon, respectively, uncovered a pistol, ammunition, substantial quantities of slow fuse, literature relating to the Free Wales Army, and a diary entry in Robert Jones' house mentioning "Owie from Llithfaen", a reference to Owain Williams. Both men implicated quarryman Arfon Jones in supplying the explosive material found in their possession, which they claimed they intended to pass on to Williams, whom they referred to as "the receiver".

Edward Wilkinson further implicated John Gwilym Jones, who, when questioned by police, stated that he had delivered Polar Ammon gelignite to Williams after receiving it from Robert Jones. John Jones also told police that Williams had introduced him to Gethin ap Gruffydd in Llangefni two weeks prior to the Temple of Peace bombing, in addition to alleging that Williams had administered an oath of allegiance to the FWA in Wilkinson's home in December 1967. He also accused Williams of proposing a false flag operation involving the shooting of the windscreen of Cledwyn Hughes' car, the Secretary of State for Wales, and subsequently blaming the incident on Dennis Coslett, the FWA's deputy leader, in an attempt to have him ousted from the post. Owing to his cooperation with police, John Jones was not charged with any offence. Williams later accused Jones of being "mentally unstable" and claimed that he had been deliberately attempting to infiltrate the movement at the behest of the police.

Owain Williams was arrested on 14 January, having been ordered to appear at Caernarfon police station. Prior to turning himself in, Williams had left his car parked near Rhyl railway station, which he later alleged he found with deflated tyres upon returning. He accused police of being responsible for the damage. Upon being arrested, Williams was accused of involvement with the Free Wales Army and the Penisa'r Waun bombing, which he denied. He was charged with unlawful possession of explosives and subsequently went on hunger strike in protest against his arrest. However, Williams was granted bail on 29 February and, facing what he alleged were traces of nitroglycerine planted on his car in Rhyl, decided to flee the country and seek refuge in Ireland. On his way to Ireland, Williams was sheltered in Brittany by the militant Breton Liberation Front (FLB). After Williams failed to answer bail in Caernarfon on 6 March, police worked with Interpol to trace him, searching the home of Julian Cayo-Evans' mother in Spain and the ranch of Welsh millionaire Howell Hughes in Colombia. Williams was granted refuge by Seán Mac Stíofáin of the IRA and adopted the cover story that he was a Rhodesian wanted by the British authorities for supporting the state's Unilateral Declaration of Independence (UDI) in 1965.

On 28 February, Edward Wilkinson and John Gwilym Jones were charged by the Caernarvonshire Assizes with possessing explosives under suspicious circumstances and sentenced to one year's imprisonment, suspended for two years. Despite admitting to stealing the explosives from his workplace, police were satisfied that Arfon Jones' motives were financial in nature, resulting in him receiving a £15 fine on 15 February. Owain Williams returned to the United Kingdom on 27 August, several months later, and was immediately arrested by police at Birmingham Airport alongside his new Irish girlfriend, Catherine Quaid. Despite having absconded while on bail, Williams' trial in November lasted only five days and concluded with him being cleared of all charges relating to the Penisa'r Waun bombing and the possession of nitroglycerine. John Jenkins attributed this series of events to the organisation's eventual downfall, citing Williams' meeting with him at Loggerheads near Mold days before his departure for Ireland as a breach of protocol. Earlier that day, Jenkins had performed with the Royal Welch Fusiliers band during Saint David's Day celebrations and was still wearing his distinctive uniform, which was witnessed by Williams' girlfriend. This became a source of tension between the two men, as Williams denied the allegation and maintained that Ernie Alders and Ann Woodgate were responsible for the breach.

==== Investiture of Prince Charles ====
===== Prelude =====
Following the Snowdonia Country Club bombing, security arrangements at collieries and quarries across Wales were strengthened to prevent further thefts of explosives. Nevertheless, John Jenkins and Ernie Alders succeeded in raiding the explosives store at Hafod Colliery near Wrexham on 23 January 1968. Gelignite had been stolen from the same colliery the previous year by Free Wales Army member Harry Jones, for which he was arrested and subsequently convicted. The pair allegedly stole approximately 300 Ib of gelignite from the site with the aid of a worker, and Jenkins proceeded to hide the explosives in the dental centre of Saighton Camp. While being interviewed by police following the arrests of Jenkins and Alders in 1969, Ann Woodgate claimed that Alders had informed her of his involvement in the theft. From this point, Jenkins' control over the organisation was solidified. By this stage, the sale of Venner time switches was being monitored by Special Branch, prompting Jenkins to manufacture his own timing devices in the camp's dental centre.

====== Llanishen and Picton Hall ======
With the explosives obtained during the Hafod Colliery raid and the ability to manufacture timing devices internally, John Jenkins was able to escalate the bombing campaign in both frequency and severity in the lead-up to the investiture of Prince Charles. The first of these strikes occurred in the early hours of 28 March 1968, when a 10 lb gelignite bomb caused £3,000 worth of damage to the Inland Revenue office in the Llanishen area of Cardiff. A month later, on 2 May, MAC held a clandestine press conference at Picton Hall near Chester, attended by Wrexham Leader journalists Ian Skidmore, Emyr Jones and Harold Pendlebury. Arranged in secrecy, the press conference saw Jenkins, Ernie Alders and John Roberts, Alders' stepbrother, wearing balaclavas in a dimly lit room while issuing a statement to the journalists that revealed the organisation's existence and motivations. To substantiate their claims, Jenkins cited the amount of gelignite stolen from Hafod Colliery and the cream colour of the timer used in the Llanishen bomb. He further cited the subjugation of Wales and the Aberfan disaster as motivations for the campaign, and implied that a threat existed to the life of Prince Charles. Jenkins later stated that the threat had no substance and had been intended to alarm the authorities.

====== The Welsh Office and Helsby ======
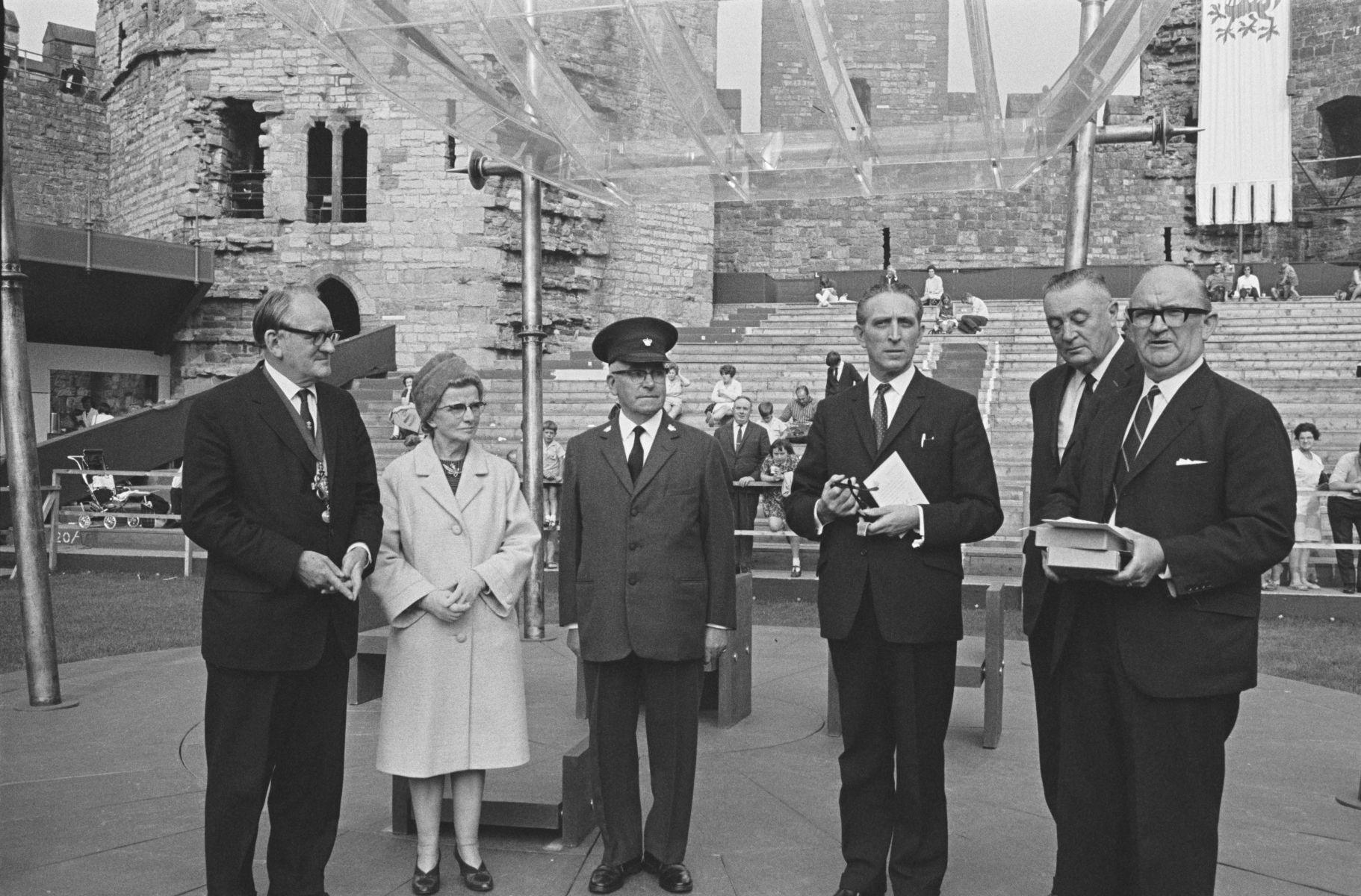
George Thomas (third from right) assumed responsibility for organising the investiture of Prince Charles in 1968

Another bombing occurred in Cardiff in the early hours of 25 May 1968, when MAC targeted the Welsh Office in Cathays Park in protest against the recently appointed Secretary of State for Wales, George Thomas. Thomas had been placed in charge of the investiture proceedings and was firmly opposed to Welsh devolution and the extension of protections for the Welsh language. The bombing damaged up to thirty rooms, causing an estimated £5,000 worth of damage. Three days later, at 2:45 a.m., another bombing damaged the supports of a pipeline carrying water from Lake Vyrnwy to Liverpool near Llanwddyn. The bombing sparked a public dispute between George Thomas and Gwynfor Evans, after Evans challenged Thomas' assertion that Welsh nationalists had "created a monster they could not control" and accused them of fostering "anti-English hatred". A month later, on 27 June, MAC carried out its first bombing in England, causing serious damage to the Liverpool Corporation aqueduct where it crossed the railway line between Chester and Warrington near Helsby.

====== Pembrey and the Shrewsbury Unit ======
Due to the failure of Welsh police forces to identify the bombers, the Home Office became suspicious that sympathisers within the police were leaking information. On 31 May 1968, a meeting of senior police and Special Branch officials in Cardiff concluded that the Home Office needed to become directly involved in the investigation. Following a subsequent meeting in London involving Special Branch and MI5 on 7 July, Deputy Under-Secretary James Waddell advised Prime Minister James Callaghan to take action against the Welsh police forces, regardless of whether doing so aroused "the susceptibilities of some Welsh chief constables". This culminated in the formation of a special task force comprising officers from Special Branch and MI5 under the command of Jock Wilson. Known as the "Shrewsbury Unit", it was based just across the border in the Shropshire town to avoid interference from Welsh police forces.

The Shrewsbury Unit's first breakthrough came following an incident on 8 September 1968, when a bomb detonated in the control tower of RAF Pembrey in Carmarthenshire, seriously injuring Warrant Officer William Hougham. Unlike the other bombings, which had employed gelignite, investigators determined that the device used at Pembrey contained gunpowder. The Free Wales Army denied responsibility for the attack, as John Jenkins later did, and no suspect or motive was ever identified. Nevertheless, the bombing prompted Jock Wilson to intensify his investigation of the FWA, culminating in the paramilitary's arrests and eventual downfall in 1969. The final bombing of 1968 occurred on 2 December, when MAC targeted further water infrastructure in England, damaging a pipeline carrying water from the Elan Valley Reservoirs to Birmingham at West Hagley, near Stourbridge. Similar to the Helsby bombing, the pipeline crossed a railway line, in this instance the Kidderminster to Stourbridge line; the damage was significant and required water economy measures in the area while repairs were carried out. Birmingham's water supply was reportedly reduced by half as a result.

====== Chester and Cardiff ======
On 10 April 1969, another Inland Revenue office was targeted in a MAC bombing, this time at Hamilton House in Chester. The bombing was chosen to coincide with a secret investiture planning meeting at the headquarters of Western Command in the city, attended by Bernard Fitzalan-Howard, the Earl Marshal and Duke of Norfolk. Following the bombing, the Earl Marshal's helicopter was diverted so that he could inspect Caernarfon Castle, the planned venue for the investiture. The incident further reinforced the Shrewsbury Unit's suspicions that informants within the Welsh police forces were leaking information.

Five days later, a bomb detonated outside of police headquarters in Cardiff, drawing fierce condemnation from George Thomas in the House of Commons. John Jenkins later denied that MAC was responsible for the bombing, but claimed that a local MAC cell had attempted to plant a bomb at the same location shortly beforehand, only to allegedly discover that one had already been planted by an unknown party. The individual responsible for planting the bomb remains unknown. Jenkins, however, alleged that it had been a Special Branch false flag operation, arguing that the device had been timed to detonate at 4:00 p.m., thereby risking casualties, although no one was injured. Despite this, the incident reportedly caused alarm within the British Government, which concluded that Welsh nationalist militancy posed a more serious threat than had initially been believed. In response, plans were made for English police forces to share responsibility for investigations into Welsh militant activity. The Free Wales Army trial was taking place at this time, and the day before Detective Sergeant John Lavery was due to give evidence in Swansea, a parcel bomb addressed to him was intercepted. The incident also remained an unsolved mystery.

Just over a week later, on 23 April, a bomb was discovered and defused at Queen Street Railway Station in Cardiff. It was later revealed to have been a copycat attack carried out by the anarchist Robert William Trigg, who was subsequently arrested and sentenced to four years' imprisonment. Following Trigg's arrest, another bomb detonated in Cardiff on 29 April, this time damaging the Central Electricity Generating Board office in Gabalfa. As with the police headquarters bombing, no perpetrator was ever identified and MAC denied responsibility. Police investigators determined that the device was similar to the one used in the police headquarters bombing. Police announced that they did not believe Welsh nationalists were responsible, but instead attributed the incidents to individuals "jumping on the publicity bandwagon". A similar conclusion was reached following the detonation of a small device outside a postal sorting office in Victoria Park towards the end of June, and the subsequent discovery of gelignite at Taf Fechan Reservoir outside Merthyr Tydfil. Jenkins also denied any MAC involvement in these incidents.

===== Holyhead =====
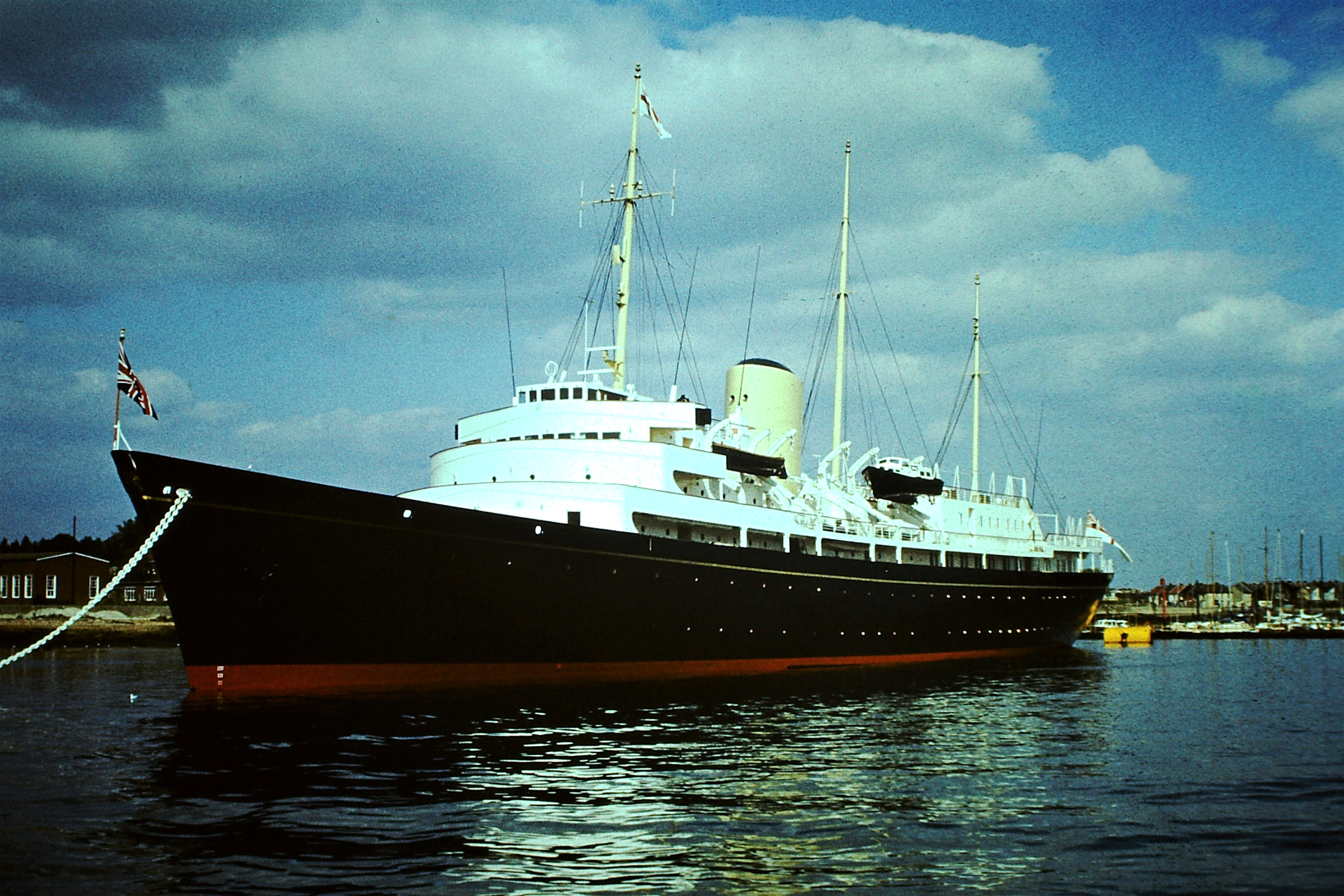
McKenzie Pier in Holyhead and Llandudno Pier were targeted in an attempt to prevent the docking of HMY Britannia

On 25 June 1969, shortly before the investiture, a bomb was discovered in a shopping bag on McKenzie Pier in Holyhead by a construction worker. The pier was where Prince Charles was due to board HMY Britannia following the ceremony. Major Clifton Jefferies of Western Command's bomb disposal unit disarmed the device, which had been timed to detonate later that day, potentially preventing HMY Britannia from docking safely days later. The incident was widely condemned across the political spectrum in Wales, including by Plaid Cymru. Within a day, three young men employed by Anglesey County Council were arrested in connection with the attempted bombing: William Glyn Jones of Trearddur, Dewi Jones of Porthmadog, and John Allan Jones of Tŷ Croes. William Glyn Jones and Dewi Jones were subsequently sentenced to 18 months' imprisonment for explosives offences, while John Allan Jones received a six-month suspended sentence for two years for manufacturing petrol bombs. This was the first major breakthrough in the police search for the bombers, eliminating the organisation's Anglesey cell.

===== Abergele =====
On 30 June 1969, the eve of the investiture, Alwyn Jones and George Taylor were killed instantly when a bomb they were planting near the Department of Health and Social Security (DHSS) offices in Abergele detonated prematurely. Both men worked for Abergele Urban District Council and are believed to have spent the evening at the Castle Hotel before walking to the target carrying the device suspended in a paint pot from the end of a ladder.

The intended target of the bombing has been the subject of controversy, with some claiming that the device was intended for use against the North Wales Main Line, on which Prince Charles was due to travel aboard the Royal Train to the investiture shortly after. John Jenkins, who assembled and delivered the device to the pair, firmly rejected this claim, stating that the DHSS offices had been the intended target. In an interview with the Western Mail, Jenkins later stated: "I've made it clear all along that there was no threat to the prince at all. Our priorities were about hearts and minds and awakening national consciousness and this would hardly have been helped by targeting people at any stage." This was also the conclusion reached at the inquest into the men's deaths. At the inquest, coroner E. Talog Davies recorded a verdict of accidental death, stating:

These men had no business to be handling explosives. Someone who knew more about explosives than they had given either one or both of them a substantial quantity, and you may well think that the greatest responsibility for their deaths lies with these people... I may say quite clearly they were not trying to injure anyone. It would have been extremely unlikely anyone would have been walking along that passageway at that time. A more futile exercise is hard to imagine. These two men without any reason we know of decided they wanted to cause an explosion at that point. They set up the explosive and one wire could have touched the other. I imagine something like that happened.

At the time of the incident, John Jenkins was stationed with the British Army near Caernarfon for the investiture ceremony. Jenkins first learned of the deaths of Jones and Taylor the following morning, when a captain entered his tent and said, "We got two of the bastards." Upon hearing this, Jenkins reportedly went to the sergeants' mess to find out what had happened, where he found fellow soldiers joking that two "Welsh extremists" had been killed. Reflecting on the incident, Jenkins later stated: "I had a part to play and show that as a member of the Army I, too, was delighted with what had occurred. But inside it was killing me." Following his release from prison more than a decade later, John Jenkins reportedly travelled to Abergele to visit the graves of Jones and Taylor. He was said to have remained "haunted" throughout his life by the circumstances surrounding the bomb's premature detonation, commenting:

I had only ever met Taylor once. I still don't understand why the bomb I gave them exploded prematurely. All my bombs had a fail-safe device so they could be tested without going off. They were always delivered fully made-up in a shoebox. One theory is that they were killed by the Security Services."

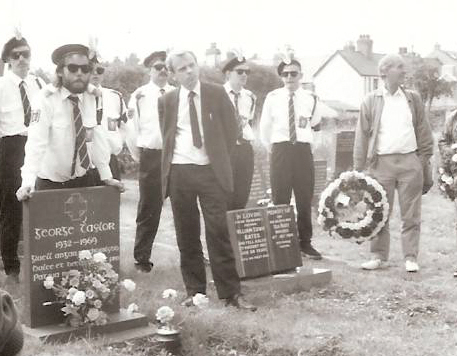
Members of Parti Lliw Meibion Glyndŵr and John Barnard Jenkins (right) attend George Taylor's grave in Abergele, 1989

At the same time, Owain Williams was in Ireland, having been advised by the police to leave the country for the duration of the investiture. Upon noticing the Irish tricolour flying at half-mast outside the Sinn Féin party headquarters in Cork, Williams was told that it commemorated "two Welsh freedom fighters killed in Abergele while trying to stop the Investiture of the Prince of Wales".

In the years following their deaths, Alwyn Jones and George Taylor have come to be referred to by some Welsh nationalists as "the Abergele Martyrs". The anniversary of the event has been marked by nationalist marches in the town for decades, which have often been the subject of controversy. In 2019, activists petitioned Abergele Town Council to erect a plaque commemorating the two men, but the proposal was rejected by the council.

Another dispute that emerged in later decades concerned George Taylor's daughter, Jennie, who has claimed that her father was not involved with MAC. Following the publication of Freedom Fighters: Wales’s Forgotten “War”, (1963-1993) by John Humphries, in which Humphries claimed that Taylor had been directly involved with the organisation, Jennie publicly stated: “If Mr Humphries and Mr Jenkins have definitive proof of my father’s involvement then let’s see it. For all intents and purposes my father could have been at the location of his death trying to stop a friend from committing a foolish act." Responding to Jennie's comment, Jenkins stated: “The only point she is making is she wasn’t aware of her father’s involvement. Of course, she wasn’t. They didn’t discuss these matters.” Humphries responded to the request by stating that a Home Office report into the bombing had concluded that the pair “were together in concert in the committing of a criminal offence related to the use of explosives.”

===== Caernarfon =====
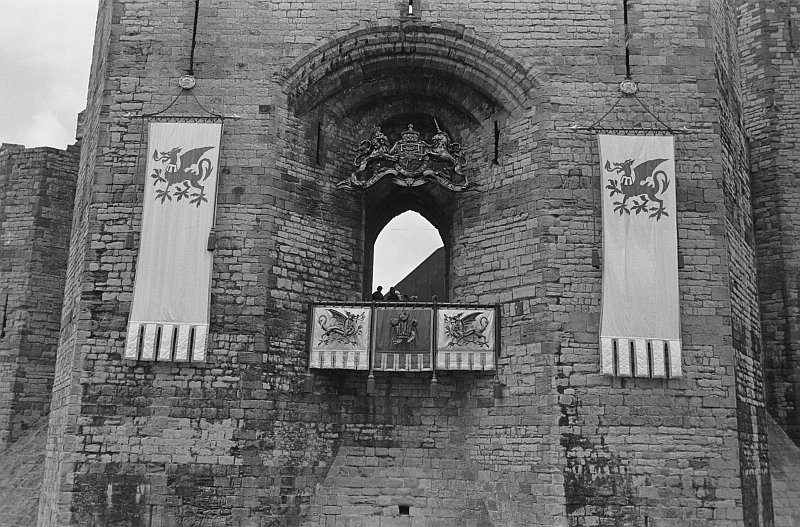
Two bombs were planted in Caernarfon on the day of the investiture ceremony on 1 July 1969

Extensive security measures were implemented on the day of the investiture, including the deployment of up to 2,500 military personnel and 2,755 police officers to Caernarfon. Helicopters conducted routine patrols of railway lines, telecommunications infrastructure was placed under guard, and Prince Charles was required to wear a carbon-fibre bulletproof vest. Despite this, two bombs were planted in Caernarfon by MAC. One device was planted at the bottom of the Chief Constable of Gwynedd's garden, where it exploded as the ceremony's 21-gun salute was fired, creating the impression of a 22-gun salute. An incident that occurred hours after the ceremony, in which a detained drunken soldier being held in a Royal Military Police (RMP) van was killed in a fire, was initially attributed to Welsh militants but was later ruled an accidental death.

Another small device was planted in an ironmonger yard near Caernarfon Castle, intended to cause a loud bang as Prince Charles' carriage passed and create panic among those present. However, the device failed to detonate as intended, and it subsequently lay undiscovered for five days before seriously injuring Ian Cox, a ten-year-old boy from Buckinghamshire who accidentally activated it. Cox reportedly suffered severe flash burns, and his right leg was subsequently amputated. Owing to the security risks associated with retrieving the unexploded device, Jenkins later claimed that the cell responsible for planting it chose not to retrieve it themselves and had instead anonymously alerted the police to its location. According to Jenkins, the warning was not acted upon because the police were inundated with hoax bomb calls. Similarly, the Royal Train had been delayed at Crewe on the eve of the investiture, shortly before the Abergele bombing, after a hoax bomb consisting of plasticine attached to an alarm clock was discovered on the railway tracks. Jenkins later apologised for the incident, describing it as "one of the greatest regrets" of his life. Cox, however, stated in an interview with Wyn Thomas that he had "neither time for them nor their cause".

The final bomb was allegedly placed on Llandudno Pier and was intended to prevent HMY Britannia from docking after the investiture; however, as in the case of the McKenzie Pier bombing attempt, the device failed to detonate and was disarmed by the authorities. Police officially denied that any device was discovered on the pier, but Jenkins maintained that police had attempted to cover-up the incident.

==== Trial and imprisonment ====
Following the investiture, MAC attempted two further bombings before the organisation's downfall. The first occurred on 14 August 1969, when the group targeted the South Stack relay station on Holyhead Mountain, which was reportedly being used by the British Armed Forces to communicate with troops deployed to Northern Ireland as part of Operation Banner. Three days later, on 17 August, Ernie Alders attempted to plant MAC's final bomb near council health offices in Chester; however, the events of Abergele and the investiture had distressed Alders, who subsequently disarmed the device. Jenkins claimed that he had planned to extend the campaign to London by targeting Big Ben, describing it as "the symbol at the centre of the Empire", although the plan was never carried out.

John Jenkins first suspected that he was under police scrutiny in October, after believing that he had been approached with unusual enquiries while serving in the British Army. As a result, the organisation's explosives stockpile was moved from the dental centre at Saighton Camp to Ernie Alders' home. On 2 November 1969, John Jenkins and Ernie Alders were arrested at their respective homes in Wrexham and Rhosllanerchrugog before being taken to Ruabon police station. Three days later, on 5 November, Gordon Wyn Jones detonated the remaining stockpile of MAC explosives under the cover of Guy Fawkes Night celebrations near Holyhead, marking the end of the campaign. It remains unclear what information ultimately led to the arrests of Jenkins and Alders. Jenkins maintained that Owain Williams' former partner had informed the police of their meeting at Loggerheads on 1 March 1968 after learning of the deaths of Alwyn Jones and George Taylor. Williams rejected this account, instead firmly accusing Ann Woodgate of making the report for the same reason. In the period between their arrests and trial, the men were held first at HM Prison Shrewsbury and later at HM Prison Risley.

The trial began on 9 April 1970 at the Flintshire Assizes in Mold. Tasker Watkins led the prosecution, while John Jenkins faced 19 charges relating to the bombing campaign and the theft of explosives from Hafod Colliery. Judge Thompson, who had previously presided over the Free Wales Army trial, described Jenkins as a "clever, ruthless fanatic". Alders initially faced 15 charges; however, this was reduced to eight after he agreed to cooperate with the police by making statements implicating Jenkins. Jenkins had initially expressed approval of Alders accepting the plea deal, but did not anticipate the extent of the information that Alders subsequently disclosed, prompting him to change his plea from not guilty to guilty. According to Alders' barrister, Alun Talfan Davies, he had testified against Jenkins in an attempt to "cleanse his whole being". As a result of Alders' statements, the two men never spoke to one another again. Jenkins' decision to plead guilty made the trial considerably shorter than expected, which he later claimed was a deliberate attempt to prevent evidence from emerging that might have compromised undetected members of MAC. On 20 April 1970, Jenkins was convicted of eight offences involving explosives and sentenced to ten years' imprisonment. Alders was sentenced to six years' imprisonment.

Jenkins was initially imprisoned at HM Prison Winson Green in Birmingham, where he was held in solitary confinement as a Category A prisoner. Offered a reduction to Category B status by Special Branch in exchange for the names of MAC members, Jenkins refused. He was later transferred to HM Prison Wormwood Scrubs in May 1970, where he contributed to Plaid Cymru's publication Welsh Nation through Harri Webb before being banned from further contributions by the party. Much of Jenkins’ writing and correspondence from his imprisonment was compiled in Prison Letters, published by Y Lolfa in 1981. He also produced a body of Celtic artwork. Following the discovery of a plot by Provisional Irish Republican Army (Provisional IRA) inmates to escape by helicopter, Jenkins was transferred without warning to HM Prison Albany on 1 January 1972, where, apart from a short period in HM Prison Bristol, he served the remainder of his sentence. Between August and September 1972, Jenkins went on hunger strike to protest his Category A status. On 23 October, Tom Ellis, the Labour MP for Wrexham, publicly expressed support for Jenkins' recategorisation during an interview on BBC Radio Wales. Neil Jenkins organised a protest by Cymdeithas yr Iaith Gymraeg outside the prison on 13 November 1972, calling for Jenkins' categorisation to be changed. Following a lengthy campaign by the Welsh Political Prisoners Defence Committee and Dafydd Elis-Thomas, Plaid Cymru MP for Merioneth, Jenkins was recategorised as a Category B prisoner in May 1975, a status which he remained until his early release on 15 July 1976.

== International links ==
There were extensive links between MAC and the Irish Republican Army from the early days of the campaign, as Dai Pritchard had received technical instruction on bomb-making in Ireland. While on the run from authorities in connection with explosives allegations in 1968, Owain Williams was reportedly sheltered in Seán Mac Stíofáin's family home in Navan. Mac Stíofáin served as the IRA Director of Intelligence and later became the Chief of Staff of the Provisional IRA following the organisation's split in 1969. Following his conviction in April 1970, John Jenkins was imprisoned alongside IRA prisoners at HM Prison Albany, where he developed a close relationship with them. It was during this time that Jenkins claimed the Provisional IRA began adopting a cell structure, which he attributed to the system's success in Wales, a claim which he repeated on numerous occasions throughout his life. One of the final attacks attributed to MAC targeted the South Stack relay station in Anglesey, which served as a communications relay for British forces in Northern Ireland during the Troubles. Jenkins later commented that the attack was intended to "show the IRA that we did not appreciate what the British Army was doing in Ulster."

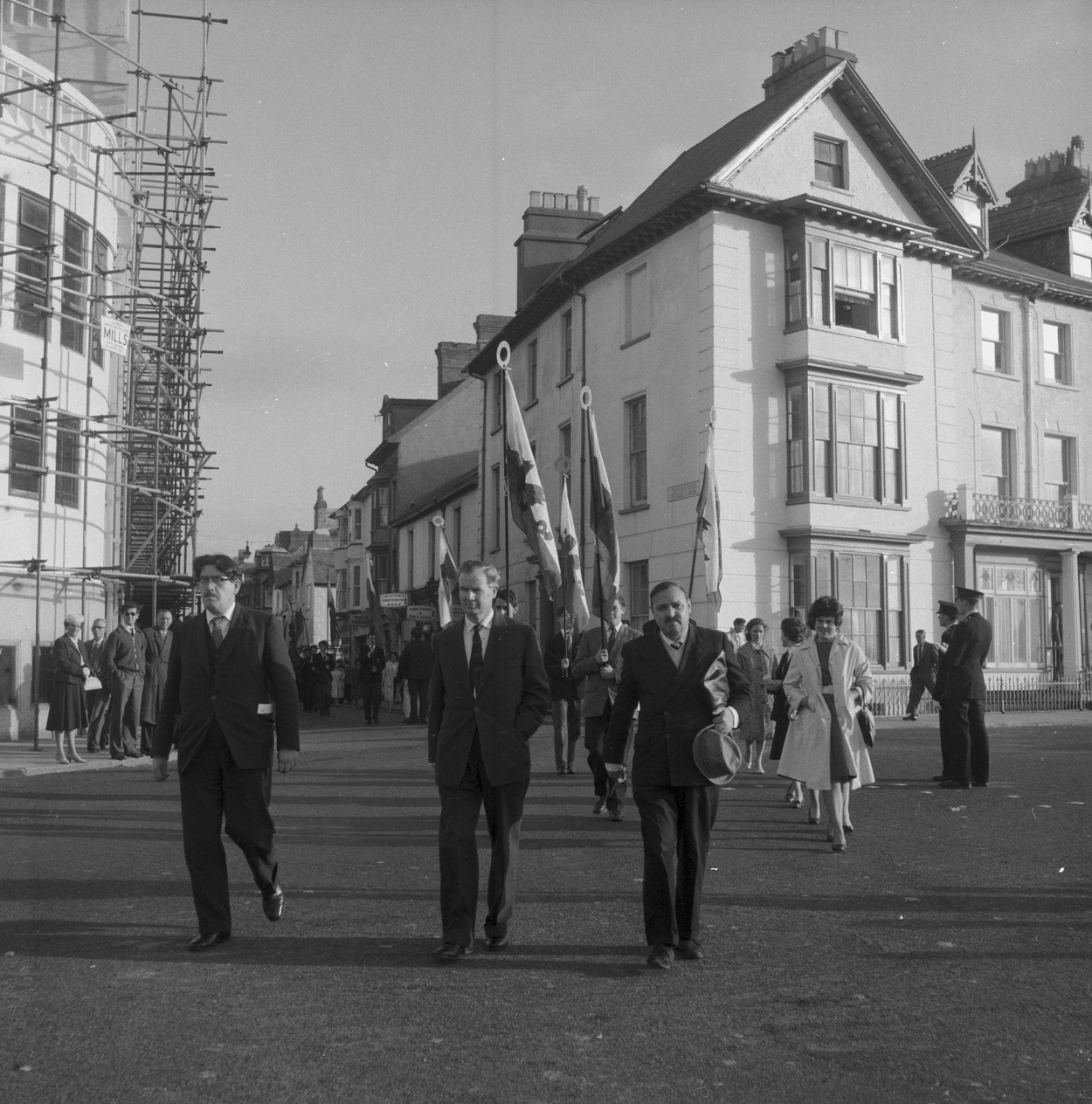
Harri Webb (right), photographed alongside Gwynfor Evans (centre), supported the MAC campaign in secrecy

Harri Webb, a republican socialist poet active in the Welsh Republican Movement (WRM) in the 1950s, served as the organisation's policy adviser and was involved behind the scenes in the bombing campaign. The WRM was responsible for the first Welsh nationalist bomb attack in October 1952, in which the Fron Aqueduct near Crossgates was targeted to protest the opening of the Claerwen Reservoir. Webb was a senior member of Plaid Cymru and had extensive links with other nationalist movements in Europe during his involvement with MAC, including an occasion when he offered John Jenkins the opportunity to establish a formal alliance between MAC and the militant Breton nationalist organisation the Breton Liberation Front. However, in his biography, Jenkins claimed that the offer was made by the Unvaniezh Demokratel Breizh ('Breton Democratic Union'). At the time, Jenkins believed that the security risks outweighed the potential gains and decided to reject the proposal.

Another offer that was ultimately rejected by Jenkins came from Rudi Dutschke, an East German Marxist activist, who travelled to Swansea in an attempt to establish contact with MAC. Jenkins alleged that Dutschke was acting as a go-between by the Stasi, the East German intelligence service, at the behest of the Soviet Union. He further claimed that part of the proposal involved MAC members travelling to East Germany to receive training from the Stasi, with the intention of destabilising the United Kingdom. Commenting on the matter, Jenkins stated, "You don't exchange a master in London for one in Berlin or Moscow, so I vetoed the offer." Despite Jenkins' alleged rejection of international support, police investigators sought to establish such a connection following his arrest, as it would have allowed the offences to be prosecuted as high treason, a crime then punishable by death by hanging. Reflecting on his interrogation by the British intelligence services, Jenkins later stated:

They would not accept that this was purely an indigenous matter: raised by us and for us — with nobody else involved... When I was in Berlin, had I met members of the East German Communist Party? When I was in Cyprus, had I met members of EOKA? Did I know, or had I ever met, members of the Angry Brigade? Had any other group provided us with training and weaponry? They would not accept that MAC was indigenous. There had to be a group, or organiser or whatever, advising us, telling us about strategy, and providing us with resources. It wasn't true, of course.

== Bombing campaign ==
=== First phase ===
==== 1962 ====
- 15 October: Owain Williams, Robert Williams and Edwin Pritchard break into a granite quarry near Llithfaen and steal thousands of detonators.

==== 1963 ====
- 10 February: Owain Williams, Emyr Llywelyn Jones and John Albert Jones gain access to the Tryweryn construction site and destroy a transformer with explosives.
- 18 February: Police raid Emyr Llywelyn's student flat in Aberystwyth and take him into custody.
- 29-30 March: Emyr Llywelyn is sentenced to one year's imprisonment at the Carmarthenshire Assizes in Carmarthen.
- 31 March: Owain Williams and John Albert Jones bomb an electricity pylon near Gellilydan, but fail to topple it.
- 7-8 April: Owain Williams and John Albert Jones are both arrested in connection with the bombings.
- 14 June: John Albert Jones is sentenced to three years' probation at the Meirionnydd Assizes in Dolgellau.
- 1 July: Owain Williams is sentenced to one year's imprisonment at the Denbighshire Assizes in Ruthin.
- December: Emyr Llywelyn is released from prison and renounces violence.

=== Second phase ===
==== 1966 ====
- 6 March: MAC saboteurs bomb the Clywedog Reservoir construction site, delaying construction by six months and causing £30,000 in damage; David Walters later attributes the attack to Alf Williams, Trefor Beasley and Dai Pritchard.
- 15 March: Owen Pennant Hughes of Nebo is arrested after police discover 9 lb of gelignite and six detonators on his farm.
- 4 May: Information obtained from Owen Pennant Hughes leads to the arrests of Marcus Gale of Llangollen and Harry Jones of Wrexham, who appear before the Denbighshire Assizes in Denbigh. Both men are associated with the Free Wales Army.
- 29 June: Owen Pennant Hughes pleads guilty to possessing explosives under suspicious circumstances and is sentenced to three years' probation at the Caernarvonshire Assizes in Caernarfon, but is cleared of involvement in the Clywedog bombing.
- 8 July: Marcus Gale and Harry Jones plead guilty to the theft of nine detonators and six sticks of mining explosive from Hafod Colliery in Rhosllanerchrugog and are sentenced to two years' probation at the Denbighshire Assizes, but are cleared of involvement in the Clywedog bombing.

==== 1967 ====
- 27 February: Using a gelignite device manufactured by MAC, the FWA attempt to destroy a water pipe connecting the Elan Valley Reservoirs to Birmingham at Crossgates, near Llandrinod Wells; the device fails to detonate.
- 12 March: The device is discovered by a sheep farmer and is destroyed by the British Army; John Jenkins resolves not to entrust the FWA with another device.
- 30 September: John Jenkins and Ernie Alders bomb a water pipe connecting Lake Vyrnwy to Liverpool near Llanrhaeadr-ym-Mochnant.
- 17 November: MAC bombs the Temple of Peace in Cardiff the day before an investiture preparation committee meeting.

==== 1968 ====
- 5 January: MAC bombs the Snowdonia Country Club at Penisa'r Waun, near Caernarfon.
- 8 January: Edward Hope Wilkinson and Robert Griffith Jones are arrested for the unlawful possession of explosives. Both men implicate quarryman Arfon Jones; Wilkinson implicates John Gwilym Jones, who implicates Owain Williams.
- 14 January: Owain Williams is arrested in Caernarfon.
- 23 January: John Jenkins and Ernie Alders raid Hafod Colliery near Wrexham and steal about 300 Ib of gelignite.
- 15 February: Arfon Jones pleads guilty to the theft of explosives from his place of work and is fined £15 at the Caernarvonshire Assizes in Caernarfon.
- 28 February: Edward Wilkinson and Robert Griffith Jones are both sentenced to one year's imprisonment, suspended for two years, for the unlawful possession of explosives, but are cleared of involvement in the Penisa'r Waun bombing. John Gwilym Jones is not charged with any offence due to his cooperation with police.
- 29 February: Owain Williams is granted bail at the Caernarvonshire Assizes.
- 6 March: Owain Williams fails to answer bail after absconding to Ireland, where he is sheltered by Seán Mac Stíofáin.
- 24 March: MAC bombs the Inland Revenue office at Llanishen in Cardiff.
- 2 May: John Jenkins and Ernie Alders hold a secret press conference near Chester to explain MAC's objectives.
- 25 May: MAC bombs the Welsh Office at Cathays Park in Cardiff.
- 27 May: MAC bombs a water pipe at Lake Vyrnwy in Montgomeryshire.
- 27 June: MAC bombing inflicts serious damage on the Liverpool Corporation aqueduct crossing the Chester to Warrington railway line.
- 27 August: Owain Williams returns to the United Kingdom and is immediately arrested at Birmingham Airport.
- 9 September: Warrant Officer William Hougham is seriously injured when a bomb detonates in the control tower at RAF Pembrey; MAC and the FWA deny responsibility.
- 9 November: Owain Williams is cleared of unlawful possession of explosives at the Caernarvonshire Assizes in Caernarfon.
- 2 December: MAC bombs a water pipe carrying water from the Elan Valley Reservoirs to Birmingham at West Hagley near Stourbridge.

==== 1969 ====
- 26 February: The leadership of the FWA is arrested in dawn raids.
- 10 April: MAC bombs an Inland Revenue office in Chester.
- 15 April: Police headquarters in Cardiff are bombed; John Jenkins denies MAC involvement, but claims that MAC had attempted a bombing shortly after.
- 23 April: A bomb is discovered at Queen Street Railway Station in Cardiff; MAC denies responsibility.
- 26 April: Anarchist activist Robert William Trigg is arrested in connection with the bomb discovered in Queen Street Station.
- 29 April: The Central Electricity Generating Board office at Gabalfa in Cardiff is bombed; MAC denies responsibility.
- 2 May: A parcel bomb addressed to Detective Sergeant Lavery is intercepted at police headquarters in Cardiff.
- 25 June: MAC plants a 6 Ib bomb on McKenzie Pier in Holyhead, near to where the Royal Yacht Britannia was due to dock on the day of the investiture, but it is discovered and defused.
- 25 June: William Glyn Jones, Dewi Jones and John Allan Jones, known as "the Anglesey Three", are arrested in connection with the McKenzie Pier bomb.
- 30 June: A letterbox bomb explodes outside the postal sorting office at Victoria Park in Cardiff; MAC denies responsibility.
- 30 June: MAC members George Taylor and Alwyn Jones, later referred to as "the Abergele Martyrs", are killed when the bomb they are planting outside a social security office in Abergele explodes prematurely.
- 1 July: The Free Wales Army trial concludes in Swansea, resulting in the effective dissolution of the paramilitary organisation.
- 1 July: On the day of the investiture, a MAC bomb explodes at the bottom of the Chief Constable of Gwynedd's garden, undermining the ceremony's 21-gun salute.
- 5 July: Ian Cox, a ten-year-old boy, is injured when he accidentally activates an unexploded MAC bomb in Caernarfon; MAC attempt to alert police to the device, but police are inundated with hoax calls and fail to secure it in time.
- 28 July: Robert William Trigg is sentenced to four years' imprisonment in connection with the Queen Street Station bomb.
- 14 August: MAC bombs the South Stack relay station in Anglesey.
- 17 August: Ernie Alders plants a bomb at the council health offices in Chester but disarms it beforehand.
- 20 October: William Glyn Jones and Dewi Jones are sentenced to eighteen months' imprisonment for their involvement in the McKenzie Pier bomb at the Flintshire Assizes in Mold; John Allan Jones is sentenced to six months, suspended for two years.
- 2 November: John Jenkins and Ernie Alders are arrested at their homes in Wrexham and Rhosllanerchrugog.
- 5 November: Gordon Wyn Jones detonates the remaining MAC munitions near Holyhead.

==== 1970 ====
- 20 April: John Jenkins and Ernie Alders are convicted for their involvement in the bombing campaign at the Flintshire Assizes in Mold; Jenkins is sentenced to ten years' imprisonment and Alders to six years.

== Legacy ==
After Jenkins' arrest and imprisonment, the bombing campaign ceased; however, John Humphries later theorised that the Meibion Glyndŵr (Sons of Glyndŵr) campaign, which began in 1979, represented the re-emergence of a "MAC 3". Jenkins concurred, claiming that "MAC 2 still existed and could have been reorganised". This possibility was taken seriously by police at the time, although it was never confirmed. Jenkins became involved in the Welsh Socialist Republican Movement (WSRM) after being released from prison and was later arrested and imprisoned again during Operation Tân ('fire') for supplying a member of the Angry Brigade with the location of a safe house.

In 2008, Owain Williams was elected as leader of Llais Gwynedd (lit. 'voice of Gwynedd') and became a councillor for Gwynedd Council. He recounted his involvement in MAC in an autobiography published in 2016. His story was later depicted in the 2021 short film The Welshman, which was nominated for a BAFTA Cymru Award.

In the BBC One documentary The Prince and the Plotter, broadcast on 1 July 2009, Jenkins was interviewed by Huw Edwards, in which he reiterated that the bombings were never intended to harm anyone, but merely to disrupt the investiture. Edwards challenged Jenkins, stating that violence "was not a legitimate approach", to which Jenkins responded: "Well, it's a very effective illegitimate way of going about it."

Following the death of Elizabeth II on 8 September 2022, Charles ceased to be the Prince of Wales upon his accession to the throne as Charles III. In a departure from tradition, Prince William was created Prince of Wales the following day, and no investiture ceremony was held to mark the occasion. At the time, Dafydd-Elis Thomas stated that, while serving as a Welsh Government minister, Charles had remarked to him, when asked whether there would be another investiture, "Do you think I want to put William through what I went through?" Despite no investiture ceremony being held, Charles' coronation visit to Wales was met with protests opposing both the title of Prince of Wales and the monarchy more broadly.
