= Ny Troor Tromode =

Manx nationalist organisation

- Country: Isle of Man
- Ideology: Manx nationalism

Ny Troor Tromode (Manx: The Tromode Three or Yn Troor) was a Manx nationalist group charged with 17 counts of crimes including arson and criminal damage.

== See also ==
- Fo Halloo, another Manx militant organisation
- Irree Magh
- FSFO
