= Covenant Society of the Free Welsh =

Covenant Society of the Free Welsh Cymdeithas Cyfamod y Cymru Rhydd
- Leader: Geoff Evans
- Founded: 11 May 1988
- Split from: Plaid Cymru
- Ideology: Welsh nationalism Welsh republicanism Welsh irredentism Anti-English sentiment

The Covenant Society of the Free Welsh (Welsh: Cymdeithas Cyfamod y Cymry Rhydd) was a Welsh nationalist society that seceded from Plaid Cymru due to what they perceived as an unwillingness to pursue Welsh independence, and lack of opposition to English immigration into Wales. It was founded 1988 by Geoff Evans, and aspired for a politically independent Wales by the year 2000. Their members were commonly referred to as Cyfamodwyr ('Covenanters').

On 11 May 1988, sixty nationalists gathered at Owain Glyndŵr's Parliament House in Machynlleth to establish the Covenant Society of the Free Welsh.

The society was vocal in its opposition to the construction of the A55 expressway that connects Chester to north Wales, nicknaming it "the Genocide Highway", alleging that the road was designed to destroy the "Welsh character of Clwyd" through "uncontrolled tourism and immigration".

In late 1989, the Celtic League's Carn publication dedicated a section to the organisation, in which Merfyn Phillips advocated Welsh irredentism and expressed an intention to "secure" the Welsh Marches in England, including Shropshire and Herefordshire.

The organisation issued its own Welsh passport, selling them for £5 each at the 1990 Rhymney National Eisteddfod and gaining public attention in August of that year when a group of ten members of the organisation successfully entered France using the passports.

At a meeting of the Covenanters in Machynlleth on 16 September 1990, the poet and Anglican priest R. S. Thomas expressed support for the Meibion Glyndŵr (Sons of Glyndŵr) arson campaign targeting English-owned second homes in Wales and called for further direct action against English-owned property. The organisation also actively supported Sion Aubrey Roberts, who was charged for his involvement in Meibion Glyndŵr postal bombings in March 1993. The group believed that Roberts had been wrongly convicted as part of an MI15 conspiracy. Geoff Evans, speaking on behalf of the organisation, claimed that MI15 had also attempted to infiltrate the Covenant Society of the Free Welsh.
