= Owain Williams (politician) =

Welsh politician

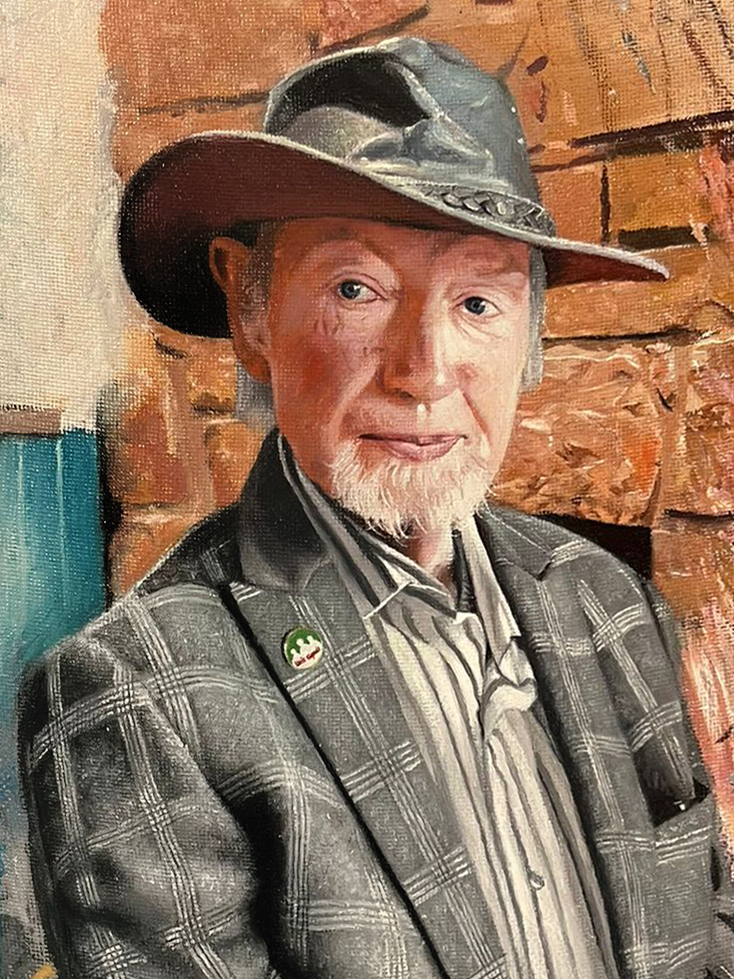
- Oil portrait of Williams by Welsh artist Rhŷn Williams, 2024

Member of Gwynedd Council for Clynnog Fawr
- In office 1 May 2008 – 5 May 2022

Personal details
- Born: 10 August 1933 (age 93) Bangor, Gwynedd
- Party: Llais Gwynedd
- Other political affiliations: Mudiad Amddiffyn Cymru; Independent Wales Party; Covenant Society of the Free Welsh; Plaid Cymru; Welsh Labour
- Nickname(s): "Now Gwynus", "Now Bom"

Owain Williams is the leader of Llais Gwynedd, a regionalist political party in Gwynedd, north Wales, and councillor who previously represented the Clynnog Fawr ward for Gwynedd Council.

He is a fervent nationalist committed to an independent Wales. In the 1960s, he was imprisoned twice for his involvement in the Mudiad Amddiffyn Cymru (MAC) bombing of the construction site of the Llyn Celyn reservoir. He later turned to democratic politics, becoming the chairman of the Independent Wales Party, as well as a member of, at different times, both the Welsh Labour Party and Plaid Cymru. In May 2008 he was elected chairman of Llais Gwynedd after their emergence following the 2008 Welsh local elections. In the summer of 2009, he was reported to the authorities for leaving the bodies of several dead sheep to rot in his fields. Williams responded by describing the complainant as a “lily-livered coward”, claiming that they were associated with Plaid Cymru and attempting to tarnish his reputation while undergoing treatment for cancer.

Williams' story inspired the 2021 film The Welshman. The film was nominated for a BAFTA Cymru award. He also wrote an autobiography, entitled Tryweryn: A Nation Awakes.
