= Manx Independence Movement =

Nationalist movement in the United Kingdom

The Manx Independence Movement is a minor independence movement that supports the transition of the Isle of Man from a self-governing British Crown Dependency, to an independent state.

Short lived militant groups include Ny Troor Tromode, Fo Halloo, Irree Magh. The FSFO was a larger group active between the 1970s with minor activity taking place into the 1990s.

== Notable supporters ==
- Mec Vannin, Nationalist party formed in 1962.
- Bernard Moffatt, Manx nationalist politician.
- Peter Craine (1931–2003), Manx nationalist politician.
