= FSFO =

Defunct Manx nationalist militant organisation

- Fo Sostyn, Fo Ordaag
- Dates active: 1970s–1980s
- Dissolved: Unknown (light activity during the 1990s)
- Country: Isle of Man
- Ideology: Manx nationalism

FSFO (Fo Sostyn, Fo Ordaag ("under England, under the thumb"), sometimes interpreted as "Financial Sector (or Services) Fuck Off") was a Manx nationalist group on the Isle of Man in the 1970s and 1980s, known for graffiti campaigns and arson attacks against outsiders and tax haven seekers of the financial services sector of the Manx economy.

Among the later notable individuals involved in FSFO was Phil Gawne, who later become Minister of Agriculture. Gawne was jailed for 16 months in the 1970s for attacks on homes being built for English arrivals to the island.

In 1991, FSFO issued a press release through the Manx nationalist paper Yn Pabyr Seyr:

The 31st of March saw the first anniversary of the F.S.F.O. campaigners' release from prison custody and although the destruction of the Manks way of life has apparently slowed down this past year, it is still continuing at an unacceptable and unnecessary rate. Since the boom began over three years ago, the Government has done nothing to protect the unique Manks lifestyle from the effects of the massive influx of new residents, and it seems that the direct message of F.S.F.O. is, unfortunately, far from being history. ... Complacency and "traa dy liooar" continue to offer the Government guarantees that it is safe for it to sell off whatever it likes and that the Manks people may be indefinitely walked over. ... In short, the aim of the campaign is to put economic power back in the hands of the Manks people, where it belongs. The time has now come to say "Enough is Enough" to the men of greed and close the door on finance sector led development.

== See also ==
- Irree Magh, another Manx militant organisation
- Ny Troor Tromode
- Fo Halloo
