= Emyr Llywelyn =

Welsh political activist

Emyr Llewelyn Jones
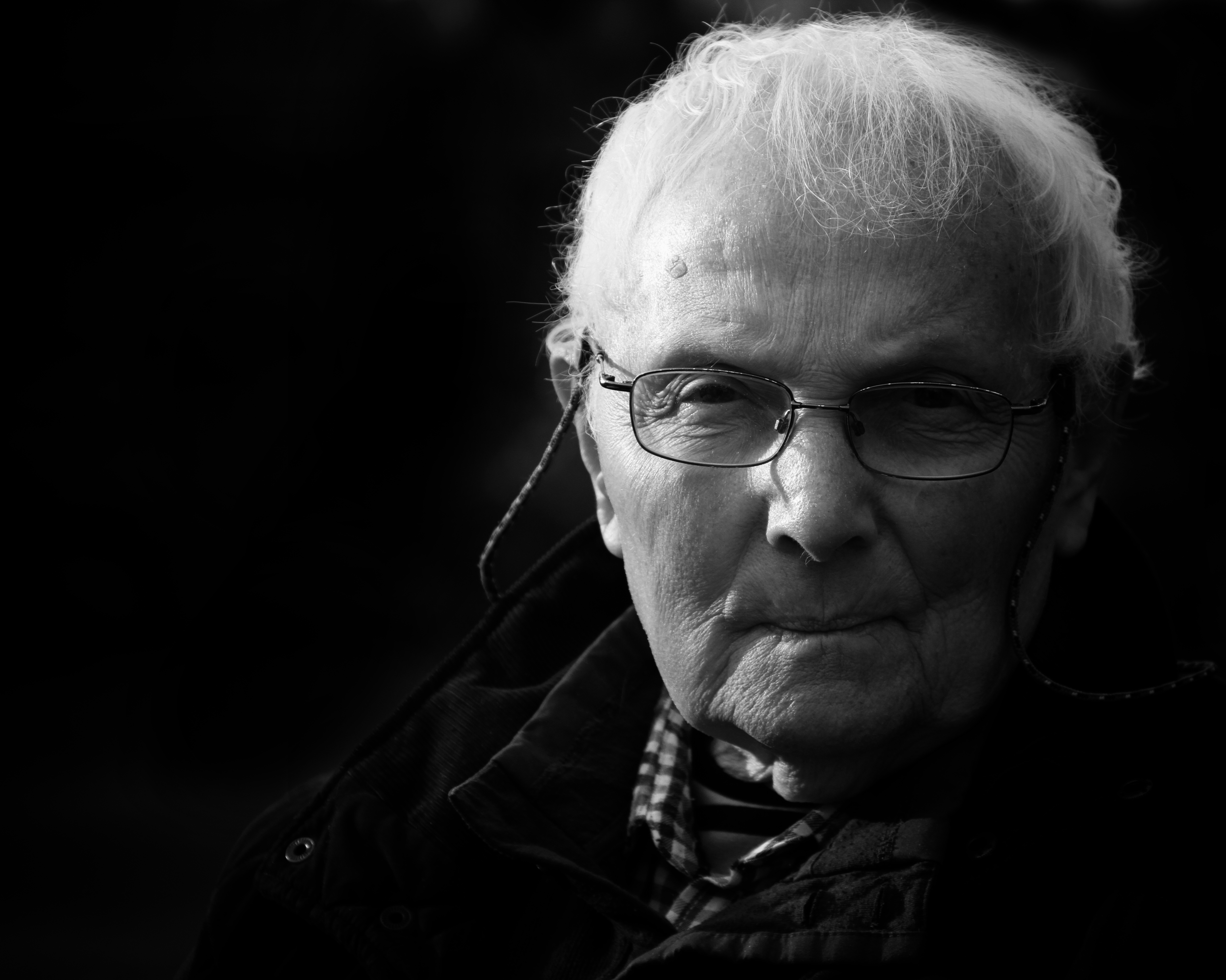
- Emyr Llewelyn in 2021
- Born: Emyr Llewelyn Jones; 26 February 1941 (age 85); Ceredigion
- Other names: Emyr Llywelyn, Emyr Llew
- Education: University College Wales
- Occupations: Activist, teacher, writer
- Notable work: Y Faner Newydd
- Other political affiliations: Mudiad Amddiffyn Cymru; Mudiad Adfer; Cylch yr Iaith
- Movement: Cymdeithas yr Iaith Gymraeg
- Father: T. Llew Jones

Emyr Llywelyn Jones is a Welsh political activist, who was active during the 1960s and 1970s. Commonly known as Emyr Llywelyn, he is also known as Emyr Llew. He is the son of author and poet T. Llew Jones and Margaret Enidwen Jones. Llywelyn was educated at Ysgol Gynradd Coed-y-bryn, Llandysul Grammar School and the University of Wales, Aberystwyth.

He is one of the founders and a contributor to the monthly Welsh-language publication, Y Faner Newydd.

In 1963, Emyr Llywelyn was arrested in connection with a Mudiad Amddiffyn Cymru (lit. 'movement for the defence of Wales'; MAC) bombing of an electrical transformer at the Llyn Celyn construction site. The bombing was carried out to protest the flooding of Tryweryn by Liverpool Corporation. He was subsequently convicted and sentenced to one year's imprisonment. He carried out the bombing with Owain Williams and John Albert Jones on 10 February 1963, during a severe winter. In protest against his arrest, Williams and John Albert Jones bombed an electricity pylon near Gellilydan on the night of Llywelyn's sentencing. They were subsequently arrested and imprisoned. Following his release from prison in December 1963, Emyr Llywelyn publicly renounced violence and joined Cymdeithas yr Iaith Gymraeg (Welsh Language Society). He later became chair of the organisation and proposed a motion advocating a campaign of non-violent direct action in support of the Welsh language.

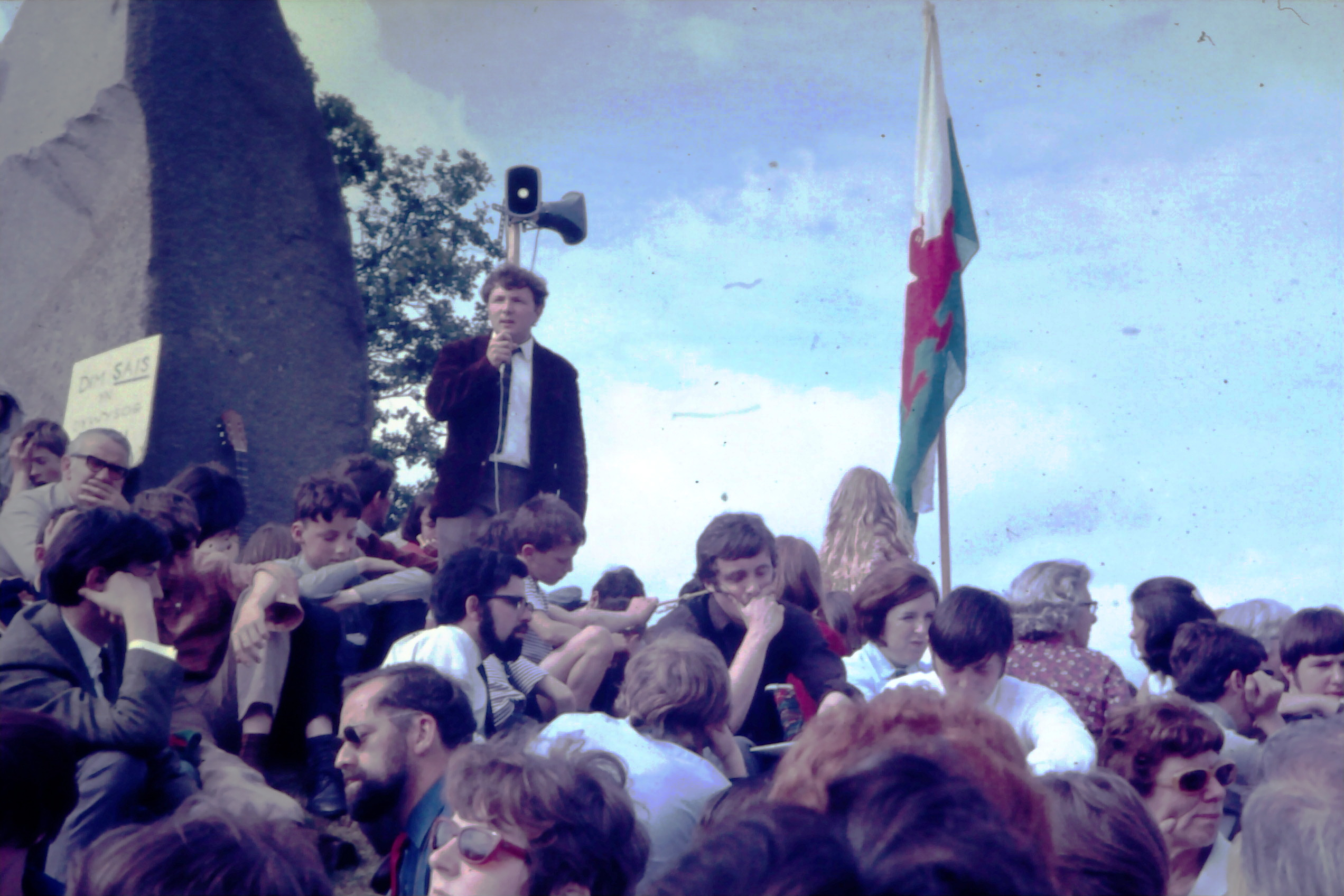
Emyr Llywelyn Jones gives a speech to a crowd gathered to oppose the investiture of Charles as Prince of Wales in Cilmeri, 1 July 1969

In the 1970s, Mudiad Adfer (lit. 'restoration movement') was established, drawing on the philosophies of Emyr Llywelyn, Owain Owain and J. R. Jones. The organisation emerged as a splinter group of Cymdeithas yr Iaith, advocating the establishment of an exclusively Welsh-speaking region in Wales based on the concept of Y Fro Gymraeg (lit. 'the Welsh-speaking land'). Welsh speakers in Wales were to be encouraged to move in to the region to live through the medium of Welsh. In 1976, Emyr Llywelyn published Adfer a’r Fro Gymraeg ('Adfer and the Welsh-speaking land'), in which he outlined the concept in detail.

In 2000, Emyr Llywelyn, then a member of Cylch yr Iaith (lit. 'circle of the language'), was imprisoned at HM Prison Swansea after refusing to pay a £175 fine imposed for failing to hold a television licence. His refusal to pay the fine was intended as a protest against the use of English on Welsh-language broadcasters, including BBC Radio Cymru and S4C. He subsequently became the first member of Cylch yr Iaith to be imprisoned for language activism. In 2017, Emyr Llywelyn again refused to hold a television licence as part of a Cymdeithas yr Iaith campaign calling for responsibility for Welsh broadcasting to be devolved to the Welsh Government. He was subsequently fined £145.50.

He worked as a Welsh teacher for several decades, at schools in Port Talbot, Llanon and Aberaeron, and now resides in Ffostrasol, Ceredigion.

== Bibliography ==
- Adfer a’r Fro Gymraeg (1976, Cyhoeddiadau Modern Cymreig)
- Llwybrau Llên (October 2005, Y Lolfa).
- Cyfres Ti'n Jocan: Hiwmor y Cardi (March 2006, Y Lolfa)
- Themâu ein Llên: Blas ar Themâu ein Llenorion (January 2007, Y Lolfa)
