= Mudiad Adfer =

Mudiad Adfer (trans: 'Restoration Movement') was a splinter group of Cymdeithas yr Iaith Gymraeg (the Welsh language Society) in the 1970s. Taking its Welsh-only philosophy from the works and teachings of Owain Owain and Emyr Llewelyn, it believed in the creation of "Y Fro Gymraeg" - a monoglot region based on the existing Welsh language heartlands in the west of Wales. Adfer slowly disappeared from the scene in the late 1980s.

Cymuned later emerged as a pressure-group in the Welsh-speaking areas of Wales.
