= National Patriotic Front (Wales) =

Welsh nationalist organisation

National Patriotic Front Welsh: Ffrynt Wladgarol Genedlaethol
- Abbreviation: NPF
- Leader: Gethin ap Gruffydd
- President: Toni Lewis
- General Secretary: Glyn Rowlands
- Vice-President: Owain Williams
- Founded: 1964
- Dissolved: 1969
- Preceded by: Anti-Sais Front
- Headquarters: Cwmbran, Monmouthshire
- Newspaper: Y Ffrynt
- Youth wing: Young Patriots' League
- Ideology: Welsh nationalism Welsh republicanism Left-wing nationalism
- Political position: Left-wing

Party flag

The National Patriotic Front (NPF; Welsh: Ffrynt Wladgarol Genedlaethol) was a Welsh nationalist quasi-paramilitary organisation formed in Cwmbran in Torfaen (then Monmouthshire) by Toni Lewis and Gethin ap Gruffydd in 1964. Its objective was to establish an independent Welsh republic.

== History ==
=== Origins ===
The National Patriotic Front emerged from the Anti-Sais Front ('Anti-English front') in 1964, a Welsh nationalist organisation founded by Gethin ap Gruffydd to appeal to the predominantly English-speaking working-class communities of south Wales. Ap Gruffydd believed that established Welsh nationalist organisations such as Plaid Cymru and Cymdeithas yr Iaith Gymraeg (Welsh Language Society) were too focused on Welsh-speaking communities while neglecting English speakers. As was the case for many in Wales during the 1960s, Toni Lewis and ap Gruffydd became radicalised by the events surrounding the flooding of Tryweryn by Liverpool Corporation. Despite the name of the NPF’s parent organisation, ap Gruffydd maintained that it was not anti-English in terms of hostility toward the English people, but rather opposed to the perceived anglicisation of Wales.

Similar to the Free Wales Army (FWA), which was developing around the same time, the Patriotic Front adopted paramilitary uniforms for its members, distinguished by their khaki appearance. The organisation’s flag consisted of a horizontal Welsh republican tricolour with a black vertical bar on the hoist bearing a gold Awen — a symbol rooted in Druidism and attributed to Iolo Morganwg. Gethin ap Gruffydd claimed that the symbol was referred to as Y Nodyn ('the note'), as Morganwg's symbol was originally depicted in red. Ap Gruffydd's interpretation of the symbol was that the three strokes represented love, truth and justice. Another symbol commonly associated with the group was Harri Webb’s "White Eagle of Snowdonia", also known as Yr Eryr Wen (lit. 'the white eagle'). Adopted by the FWA, variations of the symbol also appeared on the flags and uniforms of the Patriotic Front, and Toni Lewis was responsible for adapting it into metal insignia worn on the caps of members of the paramilitary. Lewis also helped the Patriotic Front establish its own headquarters and social club in the Pontnewydd area of Cwmbran, named "The Patriot’s Rest", which led to the creation of the organisation’s youth wing, the Young Patriots’ League (YPL). Other branches of the organisation were formed across the valleys of south Wales, notably in Aberdare and the Rhondda. The group published its own magazine, Y Ffrynt, which was also published under the English name The Front, copies of which were later uploaded to Gethin ap Gruffydd’s blog in 2007.

=== Free Wales Army ===
There was a significant degree of cross-membership between the Patriotic Front and the FWA, with Toni Lewis and Gethin ap Gruffydd belonging to both organisations following their first meeting with Julian Cayo-Evans at the Llyn Celyn opening protest in 1965. Over time, tensions emerged between ap Gruffydd and Cayo-Evans over political strategy, as ap Gruffydd favoured operating as a pressure group on the fringes of Plaid Cymru rather than engaging in the more militant displays of the FWA. In particular, ap Gruffydd grew increasingly frustrated by Dennis Coslett’s extravagant claims to the media and his insistence on wearing his uniform in public, which risked arrest under the Public Order Act 1936. One difference that was of less contention was that members of the Patriotic Front were generally left-wing in their political orientation, in contrast to the more right-wing politics of Cayo-Evans and Coslett. However, Lyn Ebenezer claimed that, excluding Cayo-Evans and Coslett, the bulk of the FWA’s membership was left-wing and that members generally got along well despite their ideological differences, noting that Cayo-Evans’ anti-communism stemmed from his experience fighting against the MNLA in Malaya during his National Service. Disagreements over strategy culminated in the Patriotic Front publicly disassociating itself from the FWA in 1966, although the groups continued to cooperate with each other. Both ap Gruffydd and Lewis were later drawn back into the FWA as active members, which ultimately resulted in their arrest and prosecution during the 1969 trial. During a search of Cayo-Evans’ Glandenys estate in Silian, police uncovered lettered correspondence between the leaders of the two organisations, in which Gruffydd’s frustrations were made clear, writing:

The trouble is Cayo, you out in the west are totally out of touch with things, not only in the south but outside nationalist circles. I have nothing against Coslett as a nationalist or a man but when it comes to FWA affairs it is a different matter. He is making the Army look stupid, Cayo; wake up to the fact. Without the uniforms and Press and TV dancing around him, would Coslett still be in this game? Probably, yes, he's that much of a patriot but that does not get us away from the fact he is still fucking things up... We must remember, the FWA is living on a legend of news-paper cuttings.

Despite the Patriotic Front’s efforts to publicly distance itself from the antics of the FWA, its members — along with others associated with militant activity, such as Owain Williams, were banned from Plaid Cymru at the party’s August 1966 conference in Dolgellau. Williams served as the NPF's vice-president. While the party’s president, Gwynfor Evans, was reportedly impressed by the large contingent of uniformed NPF members who attended an earlier conference in Maesteg, other senior figures in the party were less receptive. After Plaid Cymru’s breakthrough victory in the 1966 Carmarthen by-election in July of that year, sentiment within the party turned against the more radical elements on its fringes. The party’s decision to blacklist the Patriotic Front was further influenced by a series of disputes over the group’s use of funds generated by The Patriot’s Rest in Cwmbran, which at one point even prompted police involvement following complaints from Plaid Cymru officials. In the months following the Dolgellau conference, a skirmish unfolded in the media between representatives of Plaid Cymru and more radical nationalist groups, with Barrie Cox of the Cwmbran party branch decrying the FWA and NPF for involvement in "knife-carrying" and “psychedelic activities” involving LSD. Responding to the accusations in the media, Julian Cayo-Evans responded "We have never condemned Plaid Cymru as such. All we have condemned is their incapacity of doing anything other than passing resolutions which get them nowhere."

=== Investiture ===
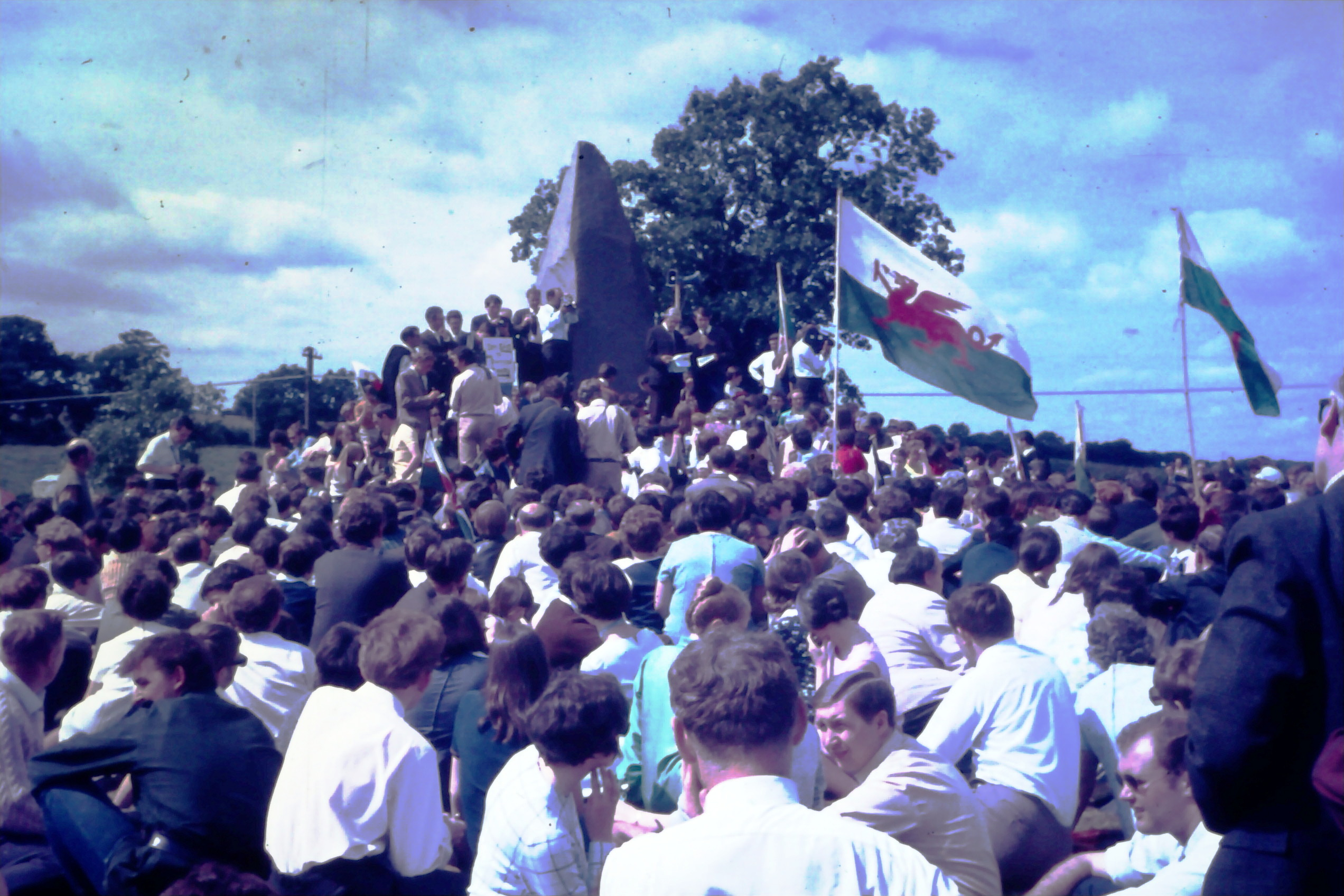
Llywelyn ap Gruffudd's memorial stone in Cilmeri became a focal point of anti-investiture protests after Cymdeithas Llywelyn's first protest in 1967

Following the May 1967 announcement that Prince Charles would be invested as Prince of Wales in an official ceremony in Caernarfon on 1 July 1969, the Patriotic Front launched the first organised anti-investiture campaign. Cymdeithas Llywelyn (Welsh for 'Llywelyn society') was formed in September 1967 by the NPF to oppose the investiture. The group held its first protest in Cilmeri on 11 December that year, marking the anniversary of the death of Llywelyn ap Gruffudd at the hands of English forces in 1282. Attendees marched to the memorial stone near the village, which is said to mark the site where Llywelyn was ambushed and killed during the conquest of Wales, earning him the epithet Llywelyn ein Llyw Olaf (lit. 'Llywelyn, our last leader'). The protest became an annual commemoration of Llywelyn that continues to the present day, with the FWA becoming a regular participant; this culminated in a clash between police and members of both the FWA and NPF in December 1968. During the event, around forty attendees marched with torches to Builth Wells police station and burned the Union Jack outside, prompting the scuffle, in which the protestors hurled abuse at police officers and jeered at them, calling them "Nazis" and the "Gestapo". Julian Cayo-Evans was arrested during the altercation for assaulting a police officer, resulting in him receiving a four-month custodial sentence, suspended for two years. The following day, NPF General Secretary Glyn Rowlands resigned from his position in a letter to Toni Lewis.

In the lead-up to the investiture, the Patriotic Front actively protested against events associated with the ceremony’s preparations and sought to organise a unified opposition with other nationalist organisations, including Cymdeithas yr Iaith Gymraeg. In November 1967, the two organisations protested the arrival of Lord Snowdon and the investiture preparation committee at the Temple of Peace in Cardiff, which had been targeted by a Mudiad Amddiffyn Cymru (lit. 'movement for the defence of Wales'; MAC) bombing the previous evening. A crowd of around 250 protestors was reportedly gathered at the venue, holding republican placards and booing the arrival of the committee. There are conflicting accounts of how the protest subsequently unfolded, but attendees maintain that police acted heavy-handedly in their response. Gethin ap Gruffydd was arrested by police after allegedly assaulting a police officer, using obscene language and being caught throwing eggs at members of the committee. Toni Lewis was also among those arrested, as was former MAC member and Cymdeithas yr Iaith activist Emyr Llywelyn Jones. Ap Gruffydd later denied having discharged eggs at committee members, but admitted possessing eggs, which he claimed to have smeared on the windows of the police van in which he was being held to use as adhesive for anti-investiture posters. Following the scuffle, up to thirteen protestors were brought before Cardiff magistrates on a range of public order offences.

=== Trial and imprisonment ===
The organisation was effectively dissolved in 1969 after its leaders were arrested and charged for their involvement with the FWA. On 26 February 1969, police carried out dawn raids against nine senior members of the FWA, including ap Gruffydd and Lewis, following Julian Cayo-Evans’ decision to surrender the group’s weapons cache concealed in the shallow lake Maes-llyn. The decision followed intensified scrutiny by the “Shrewsbury Group”, a joint police and MI5 task force led by Jock Wilson, in the aftermath of a bombing at RAF Pembrey. The trial was held in Swansea and concluded on the day of the investiture, at which ap Gruffydd was found not guilty of public order offences but pleaded guilty to organising the FWA and received a nine-month prison sentence. Toni Lewis was also convicted for organising the FWA at the trial but avoided a prison sentence, and the incident marked the end of his involvement at the forefront of Welsh nationalist politics. Sentences were reduced for most of those convicted after they agreed to give undertakings renouncing paramilitary activity, illegal weapons handling, and the advocacy of political violence. Ap Gruffydd alone refused to make any such declaration, and would continue to be actively involved in Welsh nationalist organisations with his partner, Sian Ifan, for much of his life. In the following decades, he founded nationalist organisations such as Cofiwn (lit. 'we remember') and the Welsh Socialist Vanguard, which led to further police attention, culminating in another dawn raid in 1980 during the Palm Sunday arrests as part of Operation Tân ('fire') in the midst of the Meibion Glyndŵr (Sons of Glyndŵr) arson campaign.

== See also ==
Welsh Republican Movement
Welsh Socialist Republican Movement
