= Welsh republicanism =

Movement to make Wales a republic

Welsh republicanism (Welsh: Gweriniaetholdeb Gymreig) or republicanism in Wales (Welsh: Gweriniaetholdeb yng Nghymru) is the political ideology that advocates for Wales to be governed by a republican system, as opposed to a monarchy, such as the current British monarchy.

Typically, this ideology is suggested as an element of forming an independent Wales, but can also be considered as part of reforming the political system of the United Kingdom, which could include introducing an elected official as head of state. It is not synonymous with Welsh independence, but one possible form of government, as Wales before English rule had native monarchies, and most of the prominent independence organisations do not explicitly support republicanism. While the Wales Green Party and Plaid Ifanc both support a republic and would support independence in a referendum.

== Native monarchies in Wales ==
During the Middle Ages and since the Roman Empire left the island of Britain, Wales had many monarchical states most notably the kingdoms of Gwynedd, Powys, and Deuheubarth. The most significant Welsh royal house was the House of Gwynedd which started in c. 401 and its cadet branches, Aberffraw, Dinefwr, and Mathrafal.

The legendary King Arthur is embedded in Welsh tradition and national stories through his battles for Celtic independence from the encroachment of Anglo-Saxon forces. Many Welsh leaders referenced King Arthur's messianic return to save the Welsh people and to lead rebellions against England.

Welsh unification fluctuated over time between different kingdoms, including the Anglo-Norman Kingdom of England which held land in southern Wales from the late 11th century. Llywelyn the Great of Gwynedd formally united Wales at the Council of Aberdyfi in 1216 under the Principality of Wales with the title Prince of Wales. The title of Prince of Wales was used not as one subservient to a king (as it is now), but to invoke the Roman Imperial title of princeps.

Some native Welsh nobles would continue to hold a few positions of power or status in Wales after English conquest. Owain Glyndŵr as a member of the House of Mathrafal shortly reasserted Wales and an independent principality of Wales 1400–1409. The Welsh Tudors of Penmynydd were a prominent royal house which supported Glyndŵr, and would then become English monarchs after Henry VII won the War of the Roses.

== English monarchy rule in Wales ==
In the 13th century, the last Prince of Wales, Llywelyn the Last was forced into an agreement by Edward I of England that saw Llywelyn withdraw his powers to Gwynedd only. In 1282 whilst attempting to gather support in Cilmeri near Builth Wells, Llywelyn was killed by one of Edward's soldiers. Llywelyn's brother, Dafydd ap Gruffydd briefly led a force in Wales, but was captured and later hanged, drawn and quartered by Edward, thus ending Welsh independence.

Since conquest, there have been Welsh rebellions against English rule. The last, and the most significant revolt was the Glyndŵr Rising of 1400–1415, which briefly restored independence. Owain Glyndŵr held the first Welsh parliament (Senedd) in Machynlleth in 1404 where he was proclaimed Prince of Wales and a second parliament in 1405 in Harlech. Following the eventual defeat of the Glyndŵr rebellion and a brief period of independence, it wasn't until 1999 that a Welsh legislative body was re-established as the National Assembly of Wales which was renamed Senedd Cymru/Welsh Parliament in 2020.

In the 16th century, King Henry VIII of the Tudor dynasty, (a royal house of Welsh origin) and the English parliament, passed the Laws in Wales Acts, also referred to as the "Acts of Union", which incorporated Wales fully into the Kingdom of England.

== History of republicanism in Wales ==
=== 20th century ===
In Plaid Cymru's 1949 conference, the party firmly rejected adopting republicanism in their manifesto, and disaffected members left to form the Welsh Republican Movement.

Cliff Bere, a founder of the movement, stated in the early 1950s, "The English Crown still forms an important part of the English machinery of domination, accusing politicians of all hues of being willing to avail themselves of the English crown's usefulness … as a means of maintaining domination upon the Celtic nations of Britain".

The 1969 investiture of Charles, Prince of Wales, saw strong opposition from Welsh nationalists, with the situation described before the investiture as "something close to open warfare between the Government's police and young people of Wales".

The Welsh Socialist Republican Movement was a short lived political group that emerged following the 1979 devolution referendum which campaigned for an independent and socialist Welsh independent republic.

The song "Charles Windsor" by the English indie pop band McCarthy was covered by the Welsh rock band Manic Street Preachers on their 1994 EP Life Becoming a Landslide. It includes lyrics describing the deposing of Charles.

=== 21st century ===
Wales' largest pro-independence party, Plaid Cymru and Gwlad, both have a neutral position and propose a referendum after independence on the future status of the monarchy in Wales. Plaid Cymru has a number of republican members and supporters, including former party leader Leanne Wood.

Bethan Sayed MS argued in 2019 that Senedd members should not have to swear an oath of allegiance to the queen, and instead should be allowed to swear an oath of allegiance, loyalty and service to the people of Wales.

In September 2021, the pressure group Republic crowdfunded billboards across Britain calling for the abolition of the monarchy, with billboards appearing in Wales in Aberdare, Swansea and Cardiff declaring in both Welsh and English that "Wales doesn't need a prince", referring to Charles.

The Wales Green Party support a Welsh republic in the event that Wales becomes independent. The party has stated that if a referendum were to be held on the matter of Welsh independence then it would support Welsh independence.

In 2021 the Welsh Underground Network was formed. The network is a mass organisation that undertakes community work and has stated its commitment to the creation of a socialist republic of Wales. The network is fraternally linked to Plaid Gomiwnyddol Cymru.

Propel and Sovereign Wales do not hold a position on the monarchy or a future Head of State in an independent Wales, whilst Socialist Party Wales advocate a 'socialist Wales as part of a socialist federation of Wales, England, Scotland and Ireland'.

==== 2022 ====
First minister of Wales, Mark Drakeford has stated that there will be future discussions about an elected head of state in Wales, but "not this week" during the period of mourning for the Queen.

A minority of crowd of protesters opposed to the British monarch attended events in Cardiff that proclaimed the accession of Charles III. Upon Charles' visit to Cardiff Castle, a silent protest against the monarchy will be held by trade unions, Labour for an Independent Wales and equality campaigners, led by Bethan Sayed.

CNN described Wales as the most 'hostile' country to Charles' visit. One man said: "While we struggle to heat our homes, we have to pay for your parade." King Charles sighed, saying "oh" and turned away. The man then said "We pay £100 million a year for you, and for what?". Protestors outside Cardiff Castle held banners including the phrases "Abolish the Monarchy", "Citizen not subject", "Democracy now".

Senedd member for Mid and West Wales region, Cefin Campbell asked in the current "more inclusive" and "egalitarian" society, whether "we need a monarchy at all".

Laura McAllister, Welsh academic, former international footballer and senior sports administrator has said of the monarchy, "I'm a republican but, if I'm honest, it's pretty low on my own list of priorities. A hereditary sovereign most definitely isn't the representation of my nation that I'd choose, but I care more about poverty, education and climate change than I do about this particular debate."

On 11 December 2022, Mudiad Eryr Wen, a socialist and republican nationalist youth movement, was formed. It is known for campaigning for an independent Welsh republic.

== Prince of Wales ==
The Prince Charles's 1969 investiture was "largely welcomed" in Wales, but protests also took place in the days leading up to the ceremony. Multiple Welsh organisations and individuals were against the event, including Dafydd Iwan, Edward Millward, Cofia 1282 ('Remember 1282'), and the Welsh Language Society. On the day of the investiture, a few protesters were arrested.

Since then, further prominent organisations and figures in Wales have called for an end to the title Prince of Wales. This includes Plaid Cymru MP, Adam Price, who called in 2006 for a referendum to end the Prince of Wales title. Welsh actor Michael Sheen returned his OBE in 2017, so he could campaign to end the title.

Following Charles III's accession to the throne on 8 September 2022, Lord Dafydd Elis-Thomas suggested to the media that the Prince of Wales title had "no meaning to it in the constitution" and could be discontinued. When the title was passed to Prince William within a few days, further opposition was voiced. The campaign group, Republic, raised £25,000 to put up billboards declaring "Wales doesn't need a prince". A petition was launched calling for the abolition of the title 'Prince of Wales', which had received over 35,000 signatures. First Minister Mark Drakeford, Adam Price MS, Jane Dodds MS, and YesCymru acknowledged a potential for a debate or have suggested potential for Welsh decision. On the 6 October, Gwynedd Council, the local authority where Charles was invested, voted to declare opposition to the title of 'Prince of Wales' and against holding another investiture in Wales.

== Welsh republicans ==
=== Politics ===
- Ron Davies, former MP (Labour), Independent councillor and political activist (Plaid Cymru)
- Mark Drakeford, AM (Welsh Labour), First Minister of Wales
- Nia Griffith, MP (Labour)
- John Griffiths, AC/AM (Welsh Labour)
- Llyr Gruffydd, AM (Plaid Cymru)
- Emrys Hughes (1894 –1969), MP (Labour) and journalist
- Elin Jones, AM (Plaid Cymru) and Llywydd (Presiding Officer) of the Senedd
- Laura McAllister, professor of Public Policy and the Governance of Wales at the Wales Governance Centre, Cardiff University
- Gwilym Prys-Davies (1923–2017), peer (Labour)
- Bethan Sayed, AC/AM (Plaid Cymru)
- Ken Skates, AM (Welsh Labour)
- Leanne Wood, AC/AM (former leader of Plaid Cymru)

=== Arts ===
- Mike Jenkins
- Patrick Jones, poet, playwright and filmmaker
- Lloyd Langford
- Jan Morris (1926–2020), historian and writer
- Gwyn A. Williams (1925–1995), historian

=== Activists ===
- Jamie Bevan, Welsh language activist
- Julian Cayo-Evans (1937–1995), Welsh political activist and leader of the Free Wales Army
- Dennis Coslett (1939–2004), Welsh political activist (Free Wales Army) and author
- John Barnard Jenkins (1933–2020), leader of Mudiad Amddiffyn Cymru
- Gareth Miles, Welsh language activist
- Trefor Morgan (1914–1970), Welsh nationalist activist
- Harri Webb (1920-1994), Welsh republican socialist activist and poet.

== Public opinion ==
In 2019, a Focaldata poll commissioned by UnHerd revealed that support for the British royal family in Wales ("I am a strong supporter of the continued reign of the Royal Family") was lowest in Swansea East at 40% (21% opposed) and highest in Montgomeryshire at 61% (18% opposed), with no overall figures for Wales available.

The latest poll by YouGov was held in March 2022. The poll asked 3,041 people in Wales for their views on the monarchy which showed that 55% support the monarchy whilst 28% would prefer an elected head of state (66.3% versus 33.7% excluding don't knows/ambivalent).

An opinion poll by Omnisis in February 2022 showed 52% in favour of the monarchy and 48% against. An opinion poll by Omnisis in May 2022 showed 57% supporting the monarchy and 43% against in Wales, but only had 42 people in Wales in the sample.

=== Graphical summary ===
Table of public opinion in Wales on the Monarchy
| Polling date | Polling organisation and client | Sample size | Support the monarchy | Support an elected head of state | Do not know | Lead |
|---|---|---|---|---|---|---|
| 3–15 March 2023 | Lord Ashcroft | 659 | 54% | 23% | 23% | 31% |
| 17–23 February 2023 | YouGov / WalesOnline | 1,083 | 52% | 28% | 11% | 25% |
| March 2022 | YouGov / Cardiff University | 3,041 | 55% | 28% | 17% | 27% |
| November 2019 | Focaldata / Unherd | 21,119 (UK) (Wales not specified) | 48% | 25% | 28% | 23% |
| 7–23 February 2019 | ICM Unlimited / BBC Wales | 1,000 | 62% | 18% | 2% | 44% |
| May 2018 | DeltaPoll / Policy Exchange | 513 | 49% | 18% | 6% | 31% |
| 12–24 June 2009 | Beaufort Research / BBC | 922 | 59% | 29% | - | 30% |
| 1999 | Beaufort Research / BBC | 1,000 | 62% | - | - | - |

==== By age (2023) ====
| Age group | Support the monarchy | Support an elected head of state | Do not know | Lead |
|---|---|---|---|---|
| 16–24 | 28% | | 20% | |
| 25–49 | 43% | 28% | | 15% |
| 50–64 | 61% | | | |
| 65+ | 69% | 20% | | 49% |

=== Opinion polls on the title Prince of Wales in Wales ===
| Date(s) conducted | Polling organisation and client | Sample size | Support | Oppose | Undecided | Other | Lead | Note |
|---|---|---|---|---|---|---|---|---|
| 15–23 March 2023 | Lord Ashcroft | 659 | 51% | 32% | 17% | | 19% | "Some argue that the Prince and Princess of Wales have no real connection to Wales, and that the titles should be abolished. Others think it is a valuable " |
| 20–22 September 2022 | YouGov / Barn Cymru | 1,014 | 66% | 22% | 12% | – | 44% | Non-standard question: Do you support or oppose Prince William being titled Prince of Wales? |
| June 2022 | YouGov / ITV | – | 46% | 31% | 23% | – | 15% | |
| 2019 | ICM / BBC Wales | – | 50% | 22% | 28% | – | 28% | |
| 2018 | YouGov / ITV Wales | – | 57% | 22% | 16% | Neither: 5% | 35% | |
| 12–24 June 2009 | BBC | 922 | 58% | 26% | – | 42% | 32% | |
| 1999 | Beaufort Research / BBC Wales | – | 73% | – | – | 27% | 46% | Opposition and don't knows not specified. Non-standard sample: only Welsh speakers asked. |

== See also ==
=== Wales ===
- Politics of Wales
- YesCymru
- Campaign to end the Prince of Wales title

=== Other ===
- Scottish republicanism
- List of advocates of republicanism in the United Kingdom
- Republicanism in the United Kingdom
- Republicanism in Australia
- Republicanism in New Zealand
- Republicanism in Barbados
- Republicanism in the Bahamas
- Republicanism in Canada
- Republicanism in Jamaica
