= Free Wales Army =

Welsh nationalist organisation

- Welsh: Byddin Rhyddid Cymru
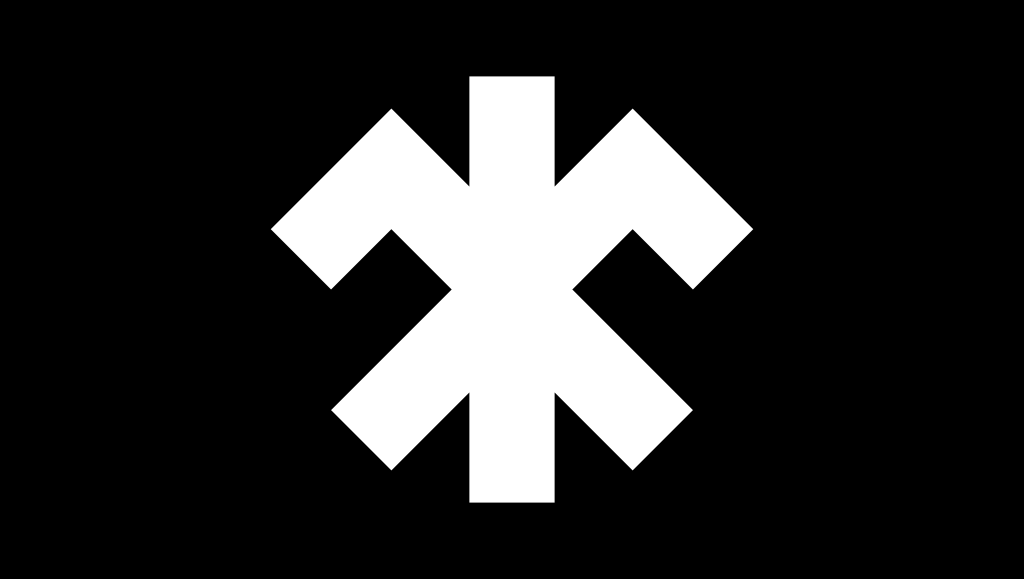
- Flag of the Free Wales Army
- Leader: Julian Cayo-Evans
- Deputy: Dennis Coslett
- Dates active: 1964–1 July 1969
- Headquarters: Lampeter, Ceredigion
- Active regions: Wales
- Ideology: Welsh nationalism Welsh republicanism Celtic nationalism

The Free Wales Army (FWA; Welsh: Byddin Rhyddid Cymru) was a Welsh nationalist paramilitary organisation formed in Lampeter in Ceredigion (formerly Cardiganshire) by Julian Cayo-Evans in 1964. Its objective was to establish an independent Welsh republic.

The FWA first appeared in public at a 1965 protest against the construction of the Llyn Celyn reservoir. In 1966, the organisation participated in Irish celebrations marking the 50th anniversary of the Easter Rising, marching in Dublin. A 1967 late-night television interview with David Frost brought the group to the attention of a wider audience.

The group courted publicity, and its leaders attracted a great deal of media attention with extravagant claims of financial support from millionaires, links with the Irish Republican Army (IRA) and Basque separatists, and dogs trained to carry explosives. Members wore home-made uniforms and marched in historic sites like Machynlleth, as well as carrying out manoeuvres with small arms and explosives in the Welsh countryside. The organisation claimed responsibility for the bombing campaign of Mudiad Amddiffyn Cymru (lit. 'movement for the defence of Wales'; MAC), diverting the attention of the authorities and contributing to the arrest of its leadership and the group’s dissolution in 1969.

== History ==
=== Origins ===
Throughout the early 1960s, many within the ranks of Plaid Cymru had become radicalised and dissatisfied by the party's failure to prevent Liverpool Corporation's plans for the flooding of Tryweryn. Owain Williams, a former party member and founding member of MAC, alleged that dissatisfaction was particularly strong among younger members and supporters. In a 2003 interview for S4C’s Terfysgwyr Tryweryn (lit. 'Tryweryn terrorists') documentary, Williams suggested that many young people were frustrated with what he described as reliance on “so-called constitutional means of asking, bowing, scraping and grovelling.” It was this disillusionment, Williams asserted, that created the conditions for the emergence of militant nationalist organisations in Wales, which was a sentiment shared by his co-conspirator, Emyr Llywelyn Jones.

The first organisation resembling the FWA appeared in 1959 as the Welsh Freedom Army (WFA), which initially distributed cards in Llangollen bearing the slogan “Resist English Rule in Wales: WFA”. Cards were later distributed nationwide and placed under beer mats, in telephone kiosks, libraries, bookshops and anywhere else the group could think of. Supporters of the group often daubed the group's acronym alongside nationalist slogans in areas where cards had been distributed, generating momentum for the illusive organisation. At the same time, Harri Webb, a republican socialist poet and former member of the Welsh Republican Movement (WRM), together with Meic Stephens, was evoking the idea of a “Free Wales Army” in his poetry and songs. In 1952, Webb designed the “White Eagle of Snowdonia”, often referred to as Yr Eryr Wen (lit. 'the white eagle'), a symbol derived from Welsh legend, which later became the emblem displayed on the FWA's flags and uniforms. Describing this period, Stephens later recalled that the Free Wales Army had initially been "just a slogan on a wall". The amorphous “army” soon gained attention as supporters across the country painted the initials "FWA" alongside nationalist slogans on roadsides, with one such incident in Gwynedd in 1964 prompting Plaid Cymru to issue an official denial of any involvement. Speaking on HTV Wales’s Only Yesterday in 1995, Julian Cayo-Evans recalled that his first awareness of the FWA came when he noticed an Eryr Wen painted on a wall in Aberystwyth, which prompted his decision to join the movement.

As momentum grew through 1964, a number of independently formed groups claiming to represent the FWA, or similar iterations, emerged across Wales. While Cayo-Evans handcrafted his own uniform from his British Army Service Dress using a cauldron of green dye in Lampeter, Toni Lewis similarly dyed his Royal Air Force (RAF) uniform green and formed a small group claiming to be the FWA in Cwmbran. Gethin ap Gruffydd became active around this time and established similar organisations in south Wales, including the Anti-Sais Front (lit. 'Anti-English front'), which later merged with Lewis' group to form the National Patriotic Front (NPF). Dennis Coslett, who would later become Cayo-Evans' second-in-command, formed the Welsh Republican Army (WRA) in Llangennech in 1965. Coslett joined forces with Cayo-Evans' FWA upon being introduced to him by Dai Bonar Thomas, another foundational member of the fledgling paramilitary organisation, who was satirically referred to by the media as "Dai Bomber". As the organisation developed, west Wales became the centre of its activities, owing in part to members regularly frequenting public houses in Pontrhydfendigaid, Pontarsais, Aberystwyth and Talgarreg. Members were known for causing a commotion in the area, as Lyn Ebenezer later recalled:

People have scoffed at the FWA, but they had popular support in the villages round our way, in the Tregaron and Pontrhydfendigaid area. For example, I remember a dance in Llanon and a huge Union Jack draped across the wall, and Cayo and a gang of lads from Pontrhydfendigaid shouted, 'Get that bloody rag off the wall!' And one of the lads from Bont climbed up and tore the flag down as the dance continued, and one of them lit a lighter and up went the flag in a single massive flame. A policeman came in and Cayo told him, 'Listen here, mate, if you want to go home in one piece, leave now!' He went, and people applauded and clapped us like great heroes! These things were happening all the time.

=== Tryweryn ===
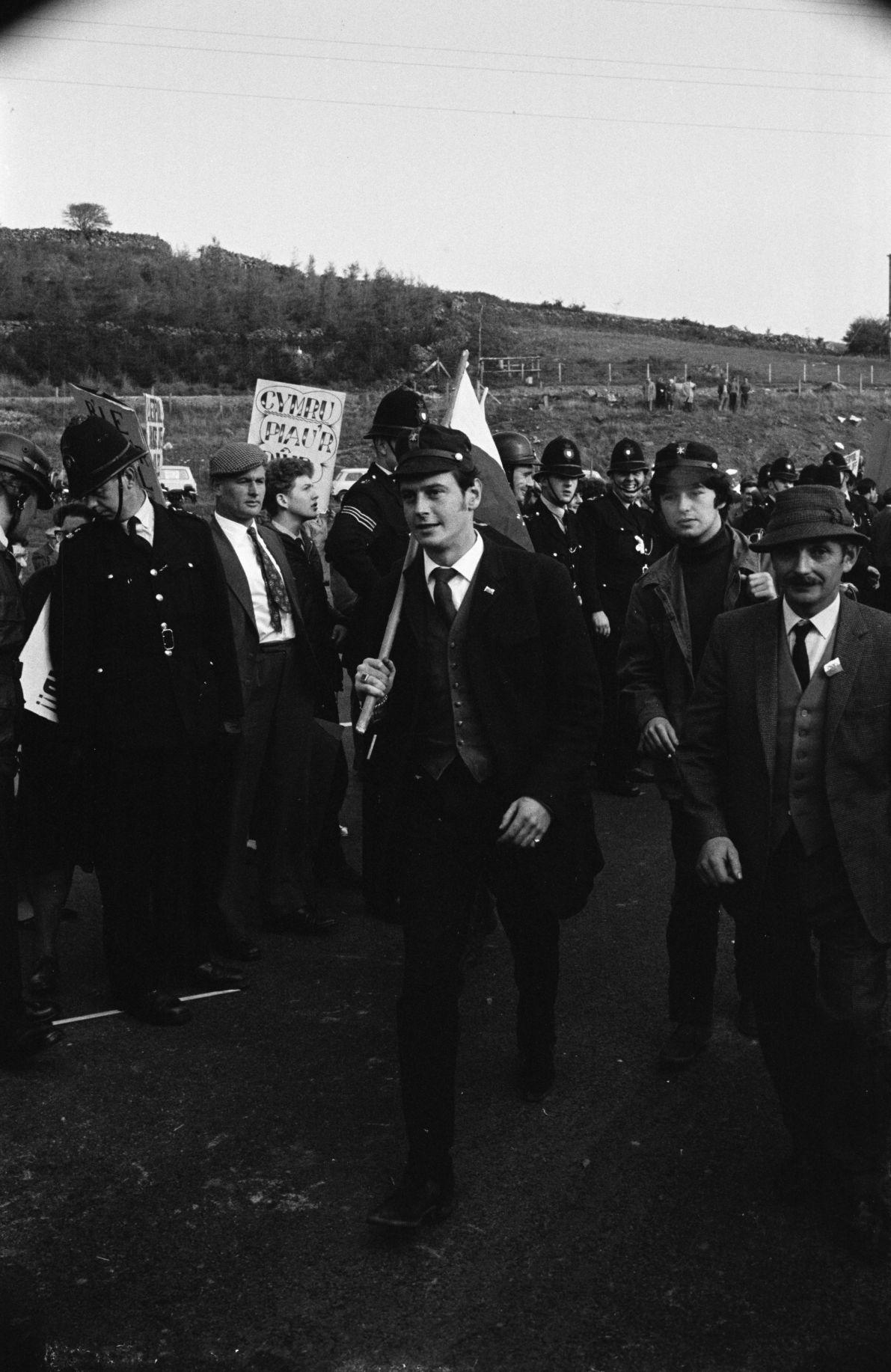
Julian Cayo-Evans (centre) leads FWA members during the group's first-ever public appearance at the Llyn Celyn opening ceremony protest, 21 October 1965

In October 1965, the floodgates at the Tryweryn dam were opened, and water began to submerge the valley and what remained of Capel Celyn. To mark the occasion, Liverpool Corporation held an official opening ceremony at the dam site on 21 October, which prompted a wave of protest from hundreds of Welsh nationalists. In the lead-up to the opening, Plaid Cymru encouraged its supporters to attend in protest but urged restraint, issuing a statement a few days earlier describing the intended demonstration as “orderly, brief, concise and disciplined.” Julian Cayo-Evans, meanwhile, was preparing for the FWA’s first public appearance at the protest, while Gethin ap Gruffydd released an open letter calling for action and issued a statement to the Western Mail declaring the group's intention to burn the Union Jack at the event, citing the absence of Welsh representation on the flag. Cayo-Evans made similar statements to the Western Mail soon after, claiming that the FWA intended to prevent Liverpool Corporation dignitaries from reaching the dam by blocking the access routes.

On the day of the opening ceremony, Cayo-Evans arrived in the nearby town of Bala, accompanied by two uniformed associates from west Wales, Owen Wyn Jones and Dafydd Elwyn Williams. In the streets of the town, the trio encountered Toni Lewis’ uniformed group of nationalists for the first time; Lewis’ group had travelled from south Wales for the protest. Upon meeting, the two groups joined together and travelled to Llyn Celyn to participate in the brewing demonstration. Five hundred protesters had assembled at the main access road to the dam and harassed incoming Liverpool Corporation dignitaries by blocking the road, vandalising their vehicles and even attempting to overturn them. The demonstration quickly escalated into a riot as Liverpool Corporation guests approached in buses via the old access road on the opposite side of the reservoir. Despite pleas for restraint from Plaid Cymru president Gwynfor Evans, the crowd charged down the escarpment of the dam towards the ceremony's temporary grandstand, galvanised by the FWA agitators. The crowd engaged with police officers deployed to protect the ceremony, resulting in a violent scuffle as protesters attempted to reach the grandstand and speakers’ platform.

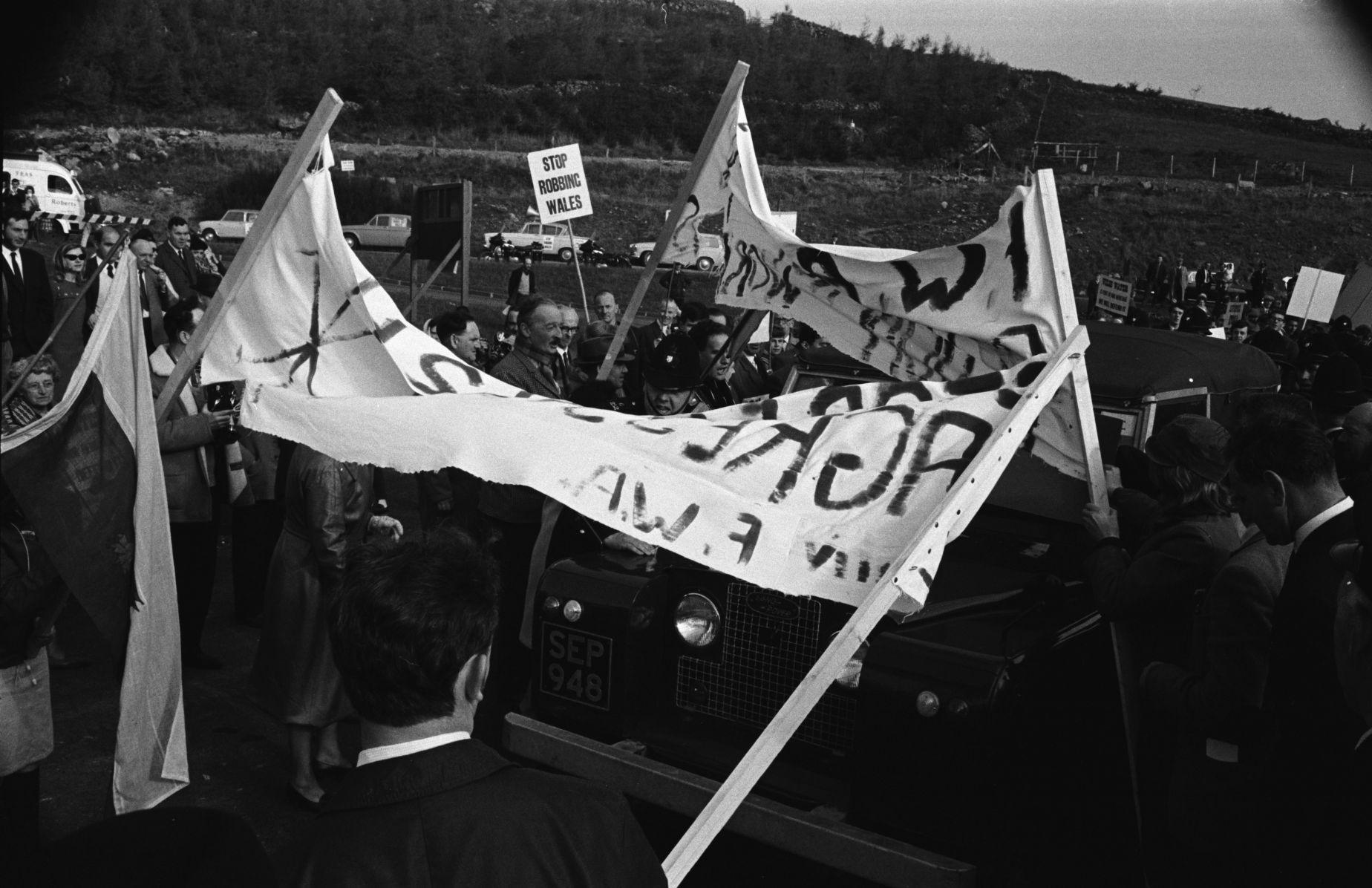
Protesters attack Liverpool Corporation vehicles with an FWA banner during the Llyn Celyn opening ceremony, 21 October 1965

Liverpool Corporation attempted to continue with the event despite the brawl, but its speakers were unable to make themselves heard over the jeering of the crowd. FWA members attempted to burn the Union Flag in the crowd, while fireworks and rocks were thrown in the direction of the platform by protesters. The Lord Mayor of Liverpool, Alderman David Cowley, attempted to address the crowd from the microphone after stones were thrown in his direction, but found that it did not work, as the FWA had cut the wires of the ceremony’s sound system. Prompted by a protester wielding a megaphone, the crowd began chanting “Hen Wlad Fy Nhadau,” which was soon drowned out by the gushing of water as Cowley responded by pressing the button to release the floodgates. Witnessing the loss of control over the protest, Gwynfor Evans was filmed by television news cameras making an abrupt exit from the event. The chaos forced the event to end far sooner than organisers had anticipated, and the FWA agitators were eventually apprehended and escorted away by police for their role in the skirmish, while also drawing the attention of journalists. Angered by the incident, Cowley later stated: “If I’d brought the Kop with me today there wouldn’t have been a murmur out of this lot. They’d have been too afraid to open their mouths. The Kop would eat them!”, referring to Liverpool F.C. supporters.

Following the protest, Cayo-Evans and Toni Lewis' groups joined forces, and those involved became convinced that the FWA needed to be at the forefront of Welsh nationalism. From this point on, the group became a focus of attention for journalists and the authorities, and a police statement on 5 November 1965 warned that any future displays of the FWA insignia could result in prosecution. The group was investigated by the North West Crime Squad and by police constabularies in Gwynedd and Flintshire, which concluded that it had breached the Public Order Act 1936 prohibiting the wearing of political uniforms; however, no action was taken at the time for fear of creating nationalist martyrs. Gwynfor Evans, when questioned by Michael Nicholson about the organisation in July 1966 following Plaid Cymru's victory in the 1966 Carmarthen by-election, stated: "I believe nobody here takes them seriously; they're sort of a comic opera group. Very nice chaps; they're on the right side, of course, but they like to dress up."

=== Crossgates ===
The organisation attempted a single militant action of its own, which involved a failed bombing of the water pipeline connecting the Elan Valley Reservoirs to Birmingham. In his biography, John Barnard Jenkins recounted how an associate of MAC had been contacted by the FWA in February 1967, requesting that they be supplied with an explosive device. As both the leader and bomb-maker of MAC, Jenkins agreed and supplied the FWA with the requested gelignite device through a chain of contacts while keeping the identity of its manufacturer secret. However, Jenkins alleged that he was initially unaware that the bomb was intended for use by the FWA, asserting that his associate requesting the device simply said it was for “our friends who want to attack a pipeline.” Following weeks of scouting the pipeline, the FWA unit under Dennis Coslett's command identified a section they believed to be vulnerable at Crossgates, near Llandrindod Wells, where the line crossed a river via the Fron Aqueduct. Planted in late February, the device was intended to detonate in the early hours of the morning, destroying the midsection of the pipe and dominating national news headlines on Saint David's Day shortly thereafter. In October 1952, the same aqueduct was targeted in a Welsh Republican Movement bombing in protest at the construction of the Claerwen Reservoir.

The bomb, an inflated car inner tube with forty sticks of gelignite and a detonator attached, was tied to a tree with a rope before being lowered down an access manhole, where the flowing water pulled it towards the pipe's interior midsection. Having primed the bomb to detonate at 3 a.m., the would-be saboteurs fled the scene, leaving the device suspended in the pipe. The following morning, Coslett telephoned the Western Mail news desk to announce the attack and, speaking to the editor John Humphries, introduced himself as having “a communiqué from our commandant for Mr. Humphries.” Humphries was accustomed to Coslett’s regular calls to the news desk with spurious announcements and dismissed him when he declared, “There’s a bomb in the pipeline for you, Humphries!”, assuming it to be a hoax. However, unbeknownst to Coslett, the bomb had failed to detonate and was discovered weeks later by Tom Powell, a local sheep farmer, who informed the authorities. British Army bomb disposal units from Western Command were dispatched to dismantle the device and safely detonated it in a nearby forest. Coslett later recounted how the operation had unfolded, and had cited a priming error made as a result of the group's haste during execution. Following the failure of the bombing, Jenkins resolved never to entrust the FWA with another device and adopted a much stricter approach to his own operations, later stating in his biography that “They made a mess of it.”

=== Clywedog ===
While the failed Crossgates bombing was the only occasion on which the paramilitary committed to direct militant action, associates of the group were reported to have stolen gelignite from collieries and trained in assembling explosive devices for future attacks. One such revelation occurred after MAC attacked the Clywedog Reservoir construction site in March 1966, causing an estimated £30,000 worth of damage and delaying construction of the dam by six months. The MAC saboteurs responsible for the attack planted an olive green patrol cap bearing the Yr Eryr Wen and the motto "Gorchfygwn" (Welsh for 'we shall overcome') near the site of the explosion in an apparent attempt to mislead the authorities, and no suspects were ever identified. Police investigators interviewed between 200 and 300 individuals in connection with the bombing, including Gwynfor Evans, who was reportedly asked to try on the FWA patrol cap for size after being approached by detectives in Caersws. Homes of FWA members were raided during the investigation, and Lyn Ebenezer narrowly avoided investigators discovering a pistol gifted to him by Cayo-Evans that was in his possession.

The investigation identified Owen Pennant Hughes of Nebo on 15 March, who was found to have been storing nine pounds of gelignite and six detonators on his farm, and who told investigators during questioning that he was in contact with Cayo-Evans. Hughes had attracted the attention of the authorities due to lettered correspondence between himself and other FWA members, one of whom, addressed as “Llan,” was identified by police as Marcus Gale of Llangollen. Prior to this, Gale demonstrated an explosive device he had assembled in a Horlicks tube to a gathering of around 20 members of the paramilitary at Hughes' farm in Nebo. Despite Cayo-Evans introducing Gale as the "Barnes Wallis of Wales", in reference to the inventor of the bouncing bomb used during the Dambusters Raid, the device only produced a cloud of smoke. In Charles and the Welsh Revolt, Lyn Ebenezer later recalled the incident, stating:

We all took cover behind one of the stone walls on the mountainside and Cayo and Coslett and Coslett's dog Gelert went across the field with the bomb on a brown ale tray, and stuffed the device into the wall opposite with the fuse sticking out. But they didn't have any matches, so Cayo ran across the field and took Dai Bonar's cigar from his mouth and used it to light the fuse and run back. And all of us were now sheltering behind the wall and I saw the smoke rise from the bomb in the wall, and then after a few seconds came a noise: 'Pffft.' A cloud of smoke rose up but no stone was dislodged! Sheep were still quietly grazing and none raised their heads. And I remember Cayo's words clearly: 'Fuck it, boys — back to the drawing board!'

Facing a substantial body of evidence against him, Hughes pleaded guilty to possession of explosives under suspicious circumstances and was sentenced to three years’ probation, but the case lacked sufficient evidence to link him to the Clywedog bombing, resulting in his acquittal on charges of involvement. Leads obtained from Hughes’ questioning resulted in the arrests of Marcus Gale and his accomplice, Harry Jones of Wrexham, who appeared before the Denbighshire Assizes in Denbigh on 4 May 1966. Gale was charged with possession of nine detonators and six sticks of gelignite under suspicious circumstances, while Jones was charged with stealing the explosives in Gale’s possession from Hafod Colliery near Rhosllanerchrugog during his employment there; both men pleaded guilty. During questioning, Gale suggested that some of the explosives had been provided to him by an individual from south Wales, and that he had received instruction on assembling an explosive device from this person at meetings on Hughes’ farm, although he claimed not to know their identity. As with Hughes, police were satisfied that both men had no involvement in the Clywedog attack and they were subsequently sentenced by Judge Widgery to two years of probation, on the condition that they fully renounce all associations with the FWA.

=== Aberfan ===
In September 1967, the group advocated for families of victims of the Aberfan disaster, whose compensation claims were being blocked by the Charity Commission, "marching on their behalf and working behind the scenes for them." The organisation became aware of the dispute through Fred Grey, secretary of the Aberfan Parents Association (APA), who sought support from Julian Cayo-Evans and the FWA after receiving his telephone number by local teacher and language campaigner Neil Jenkins. Intervention in the dispute was encouraged by John Summers, a freelance journalist who had cultivated close ties with the paramilitary. Upon being informed, Dennis Coslett and Dai Bonar Thomas met with the APA to discuss what immediate action could be taken to support the victims. The following day, the FWA hosted a press conference at the Morlais Arms public house in nearby Merthyr Tydfil, at which an ultimatum to the involved authorities was issued, in the presence of journalists, which read:

If a sum of £5,000 was not paid within a week to each of the bereaved families of Aberfan then the Active Service Units of the Free Wales Army would take immediate action. The Merthyr Tydfil Town Hall, the Committee Rooms of the Fund, plus the offices of the solicitor being paid to act as Secretary/Treasurer of the Fund would all be blown up. If, after this, nothing was still done, then the County Government Offices would be blasted, and following that the Government Offices in Cardiff would be destroyed...

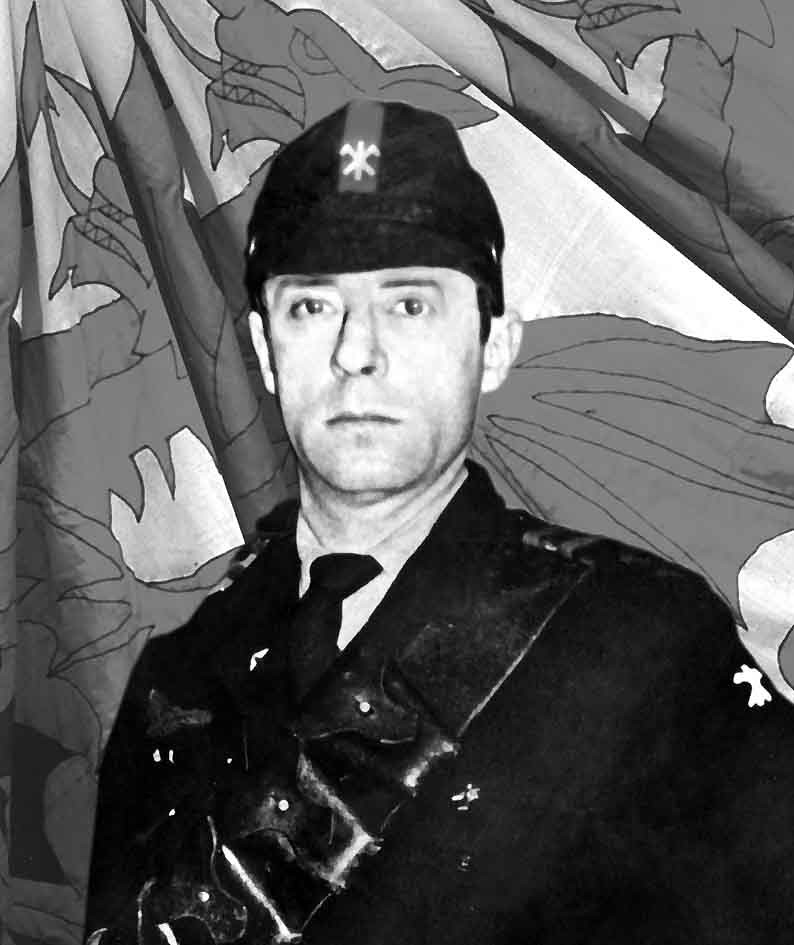
Dennis Coslett later described his intervention in the Aberfan compensation dispute as his "proudest achievement" in life

There was alleged to be a turnout of uniformed members of the paramilitary present at the conference, who subsequently marched along the high street of the town while brandishing flags and chanting hymns. Given the controversy surrounding the Clywedog bombing a year preceding the disaster, there is reason to believe that the authorities did not take the ultimatum lightly. It is not known how much impact this intervention ultimately had on the outcome of the dispute; however, the commission agreed the following Friday that £5,000 was to be paid to the families of the victims. For their intervention, the APA gifted Coslett and Julian Cayo-Evans gold watch chains, although Coslett refused his gift, believing it to be morally reprehensible to accept a gift from them. John Summers popularised the narrative that the threats had secured the compensation money, but it was dismissed as "undiluted rubbish" by defence counsel Aubrey Myerson during the organisation's 1969 trial. During his imprisonment following the 1969 trial, Coslett alleged that his food had been contaminated with faeces by the stepson of Daily Express journalist John Christopher, who had previously been threatened by the FWA after refusing to publish material regarding the organisation's involvement in the Aberfan dispute. Christopher's stepson was imprisoned alongside Coslett for embezzlement and worked in the kitchen at HM Prison Swansea. Despite his frustrations with the FWA, John Jenkins credited the group’s intervention in the dispute, along with its disruption of the Llyn Celyn opening ceremony, as its “finest achievement.” However, Jenkins claimed that the FWA lacked the necessary technical skills and materials to carry out its threats, and would have required MAC to make good on them.

=== Police surveillance ===
==== DPP memorandum ====
On 25 January 1968, a memorandum from the Director of Public Prosecutions (DPP) advised against “taking the organisation’s activities too seriously,” observing that doing so “would give it an unmerited importance and publicity which its leaders are plainly seeking.” The memorandum was issued following an enquiry to the Attorney General by Emlyn Hooson, the Liberal Member of Parliament (MP) for Montgomeryshire, who was angered after reading an article co-authored by Stan Gebler Davies and Bryn Griffiths in Town Magazine. In the article, Dennis Coslett reportedly threatened the lives of both Hooson and the Secretary of State for Wales, Cledwyn Hughes, referring to them as “those traitors in the House of Commons.” The article also included photographs of the paramilitary conducting combat drills with firearms and mock explosives on Cayo-Evans' estate near Lampeter, along with numerous inflammatory statements and claims of responsibility for MAC bombings. The article read in part:

Julian Cayo Evans and members of the Free Wales Army plot the expulsion of the English. One of these days they'd like to blow up the Severn Bridge or flood the Mersey Tunnel. Meanwhile, they have to be content with the odd water pipe.

The DPP, Norman Skelhorn, concluded that the FWA had not violated Section 2 of the Public Order Act 1936, which prohibited political uniforms, as the drills depicted in the article had taken place on Cayo-Evans’ private property. Skelhorn further described the Town article as “inaccurate and grossly exaggerated” and cautioned the Attorney General against taking any further action; the Attorney General, Elwyn Jones, in turn advised Prime Minister Harold Wilson.

==== John Summers ====
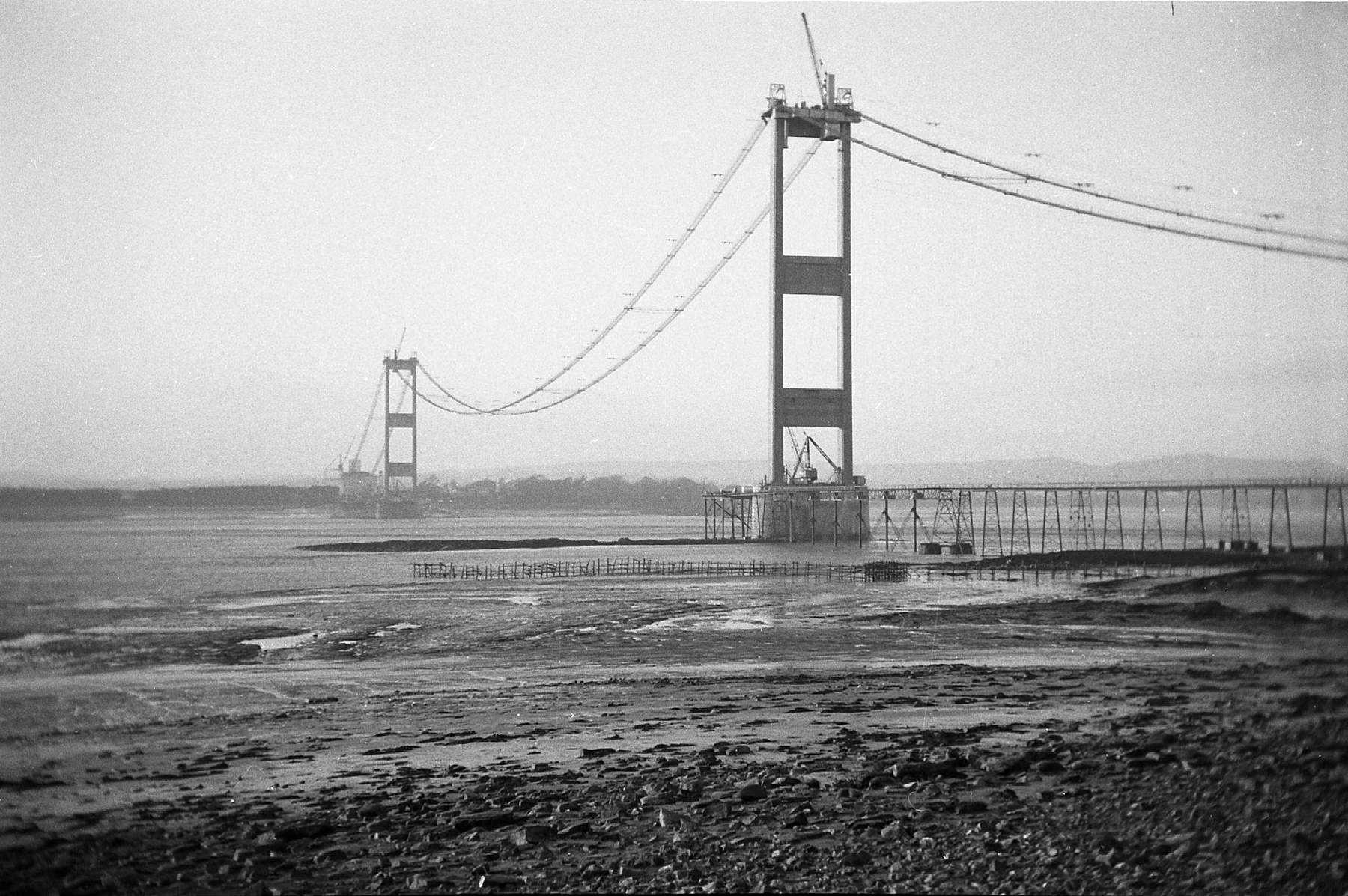
The Severn Bridge was the subject of repeated threats of attack by the FWA during the final stages of its construction

Despite persistent media coverage of the group’s extravagant claims, it was later revealed by papers from The National Archives that the journalist John Summers, one of the reporters publishing such stories, was in fact a police informant. In the papers, it was stated that Summers had been supplying Kenneth Clark of the No. 8 Regional Crime Squad with detailed reports of his meetings with the FWA, including names, addresses, photographs and even a spent 9mm cartridge. One of Summers’ reports to Clark in August 1966 described a meeting with the group at the Stag and Pheasant Inn in Pontarsais, where members had openly discussed using explosives to destroy the newly constructed Severn Bridge linking England and Wales. Julian Cayo-Evans was contacted by telephone by the Western Mail regarding the threats against the bridge and asked to respond to comments by one of the project's civil engineers, who had reportedly stated that only an "atom bomb would shift it". In response, Cayo-Evans claimed that the FWA possessed an atom bomb and that a pilot named "Griffiths" had been instructed to fly over the bridge and drop it.

Despite the threats made by the FWA against the bridge, it was opened by Elizabeth II on 8 September 1966 without incident, albeit under tight security and in a ceremony held on the English side of the River Severn. Perhaps the most significant aspect of Summers’ involvement with the police is that he was actively informing on the group as early as 1966, indicating that the authorities had detailed knowledge of its activities for several years prior to the arrests and subsequent trial in 1969. Many in Welsh political and media circles regarded Summers with suspicion and antipathy, and he was banned from collaborating with the Western Mail by editor John Giddings, who reportedly instructed John Humphries: "I want nothing to do with him. He's dangerous, unreliable. If he wants to complain, tell him to write a letter." Kenneth Clark’s report, preserved in The National Archives, offers insight into Summers’ motivations for informing on the group, stating that:

Summers would seem to be increasingly uneasy as to his contact with the Free Wales Army and goes to great lengths to emphasise that his only connection with the organisation is as a journalist. It is impossible to assess to what degree Cayo Evans and his henchmen have led Summers on, either with a view to publicity or simply to obtain money from him in payment for a story. Summers denies, incidentally, that he has ever paid Cayo Evans but I rather doubt that Cayo Evans has not received money from Summers himself or from his publishers.

==== Pembrey ====
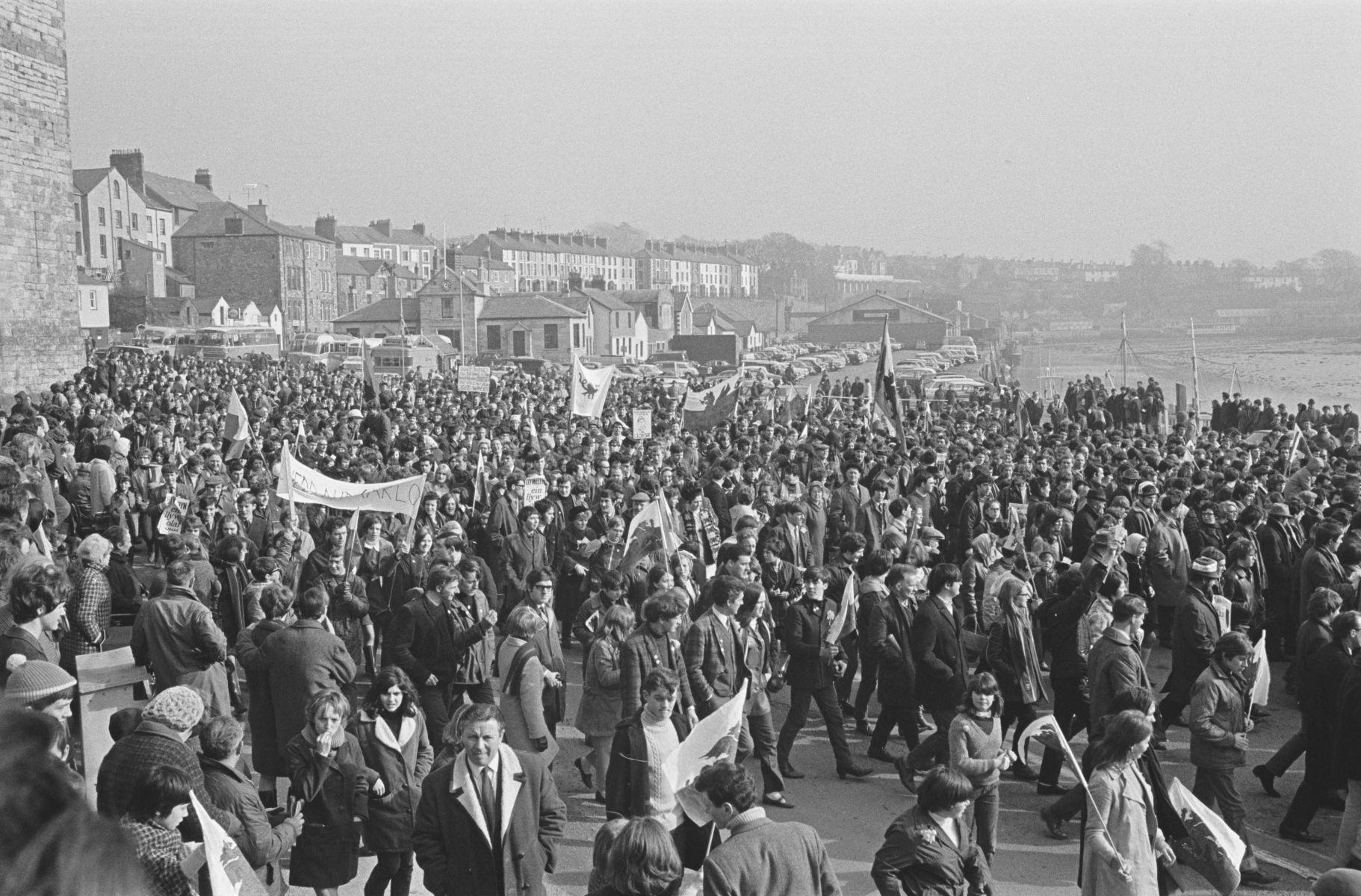
Tensions in Wales increased as opposition to the investiture of Charles escalated in the lead-up to the ceremony in Caernarfon

Following the announcement in May 1967 that Prince Charles would be invested as Prince of Wales in a ceremony in Caernarfon on 1 July 1969, MAC intensified its bombing campaign, prompting the formation of a Special Branch task force under Jock Wilson, known as the “Shrewsbury Unit,” to identify the bombers. Supported by MI5 agents, the unit was based just over the border in Shropshire to avoid interference from local Welsh police forces, which were at this stage regarded by the Home Office with suspicion due to their failure to effectively address the bombing campaign. Under the intense scrutiny of the Shrewsbury Unit, the fortunes of the FWA were soon to change when a bomb detonated in the control tower of RAF Pembrey in Carmarthenshire on 8 September 1968, seriously injuring Warrant Officer William Hougham.

The attack drew fierce condemnation across all political circles in Wales, and even Julian Cayo-Evans attempted to distance both the FWA and the wider nationalist movement from the incident. John Jenkins maintained until his death that MAC had no involvement in the bombing, arguing that the group had always used gelignite in its devices rather than the gunpowder employed in the Pembrey attack. Several theories have since been proposed regarding the attack - one suggesting it was carried out by locals angered by low-level air exercises from the base, and another, advanced by Gwynfor Evans, attributing it to an RAF cadet who was later committed to a psychiatric ward. No suspect was ever identified, but the incident nonetheless marked the beginning of the end for the FWA. Within days of the bombing, Cayo-Evans was approached for questioning by Jock Wilson, during which a deal was allegedly struck whereby the organisation would be absolved of any responsibility for the attack in exchange for the disclosure of its weapons cache. Photographs of police frogmen recovering the FWA’s cache of guns and munitions from the shallow lake of Maes-llyn near Tregaron were published in the Western Mail in the days that followed.

=== Trial and imprisonment ===
Details surrounding the alleged deal between Cayo-Evans and Jock Wilson have been fiercely disputed, with Cayo-Evans claiming that Wilson had threatened him with life imprisonment and the loss of both his Glandenys estate and access to his children if he refused to cooperate. One of the officers involved in the Shrewsbury Unit, Detective Chief Inspector John Owen Evans, dismissed Cayo-Evans’ claims of coercion, stating that it was well known in police circles that “Cayo and Dennis Coslett would make up stories afterwards." Evans was regarded as a nemesis by the FWA, and Coslett had previously punched him during an attempted arrest in connection with a separate firearms offence the same year. Speaking to the historian Wyn Thomas in later life, Coslett said he bore no ill will towards Cayo-Evans for his decision, but described it as “a silly thing to do,” since the authorities now had “all the evidence to commit us to trial.” Following the events of Pembrey and the seizure of the FWA arms cache, Harold Wilson personally advised the Attorney General to reconsider his previous stance on pressing charges against the paramilitary.

Months later, on 26 February 1969, nine members were arrested in dawn raids and charged with a range of public order, firearms and explosives offences. Gethin ap Gruffydd later claimed that the authorities had "struck much earlier" than he had anticipated, stating that he had been planning to move FWA and NPF members to safe houses in Scotland prior to any police raid. His plan, which was foiled, had been to remain in hiding until nearer the date of the investiture, before returning to Wales to engage in a campaign of disruption. Glyn Rowlands, General Secretary of the Patriotic Front, suspected that a major police operation was imminent after officers who stopped him for driving under the influence allowed him to go, reportedly stating that they wanted him "for something bigger". In protest at the arrests, Marcus Gale daubed FWA slogans near schools in Llangollen on the evening of 14 March and was subsequently arrested again. On 8 July, the Wrexham Leader reported that Gale had pleaded guilty to committing wilful damage and had been sentenced by Llangollen Court to three years' probation and ordered to pay a £25 fine. In the period between the arrests and trial, the nine men were held in solitary confinement. David John Underhill, also known as "Dafydd y Dug" (lit. 'Dafydd the duke'), later claimed that the conditions of confinement, including continuous exposure to artificial light, caused permanent visual impairment.

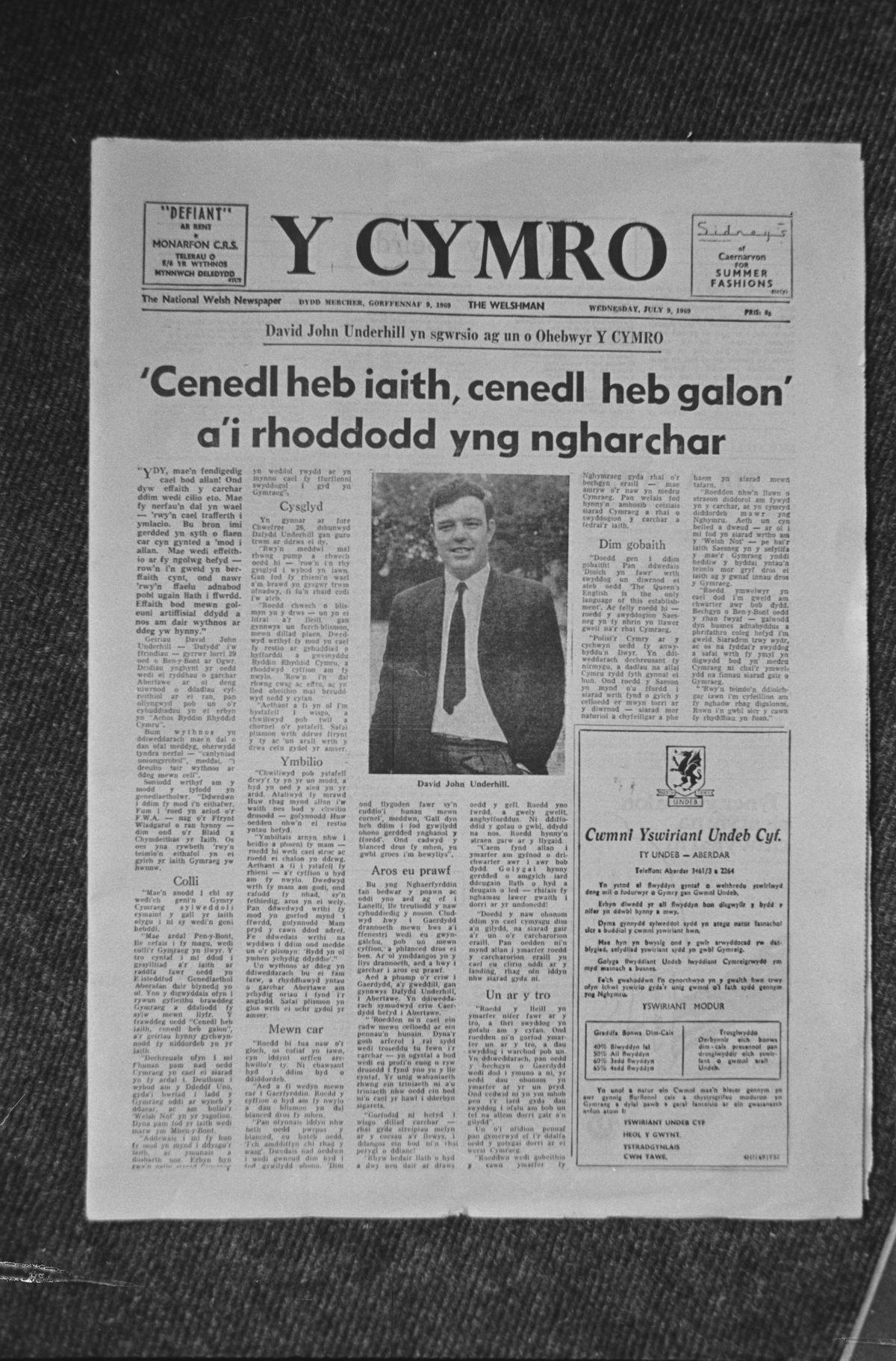
Front page of Welsh-language newspaper Y Cymro on 9 July 1969, featuring an interview with David John Underhill regarding the Free Wales Army trial

The trial, in Swansea, lasted 53 days, ending on the day of the investiture on 1 July 1969. On the first day of the trial the defendants were "greeted with an impromptu recital of 'Hen Wlad Fy Nhadau' from the public gallery." Almost all of the prosecution's evidence came from journalists who had reported the group's claims. John Summers was never called to give evidence, but defence counsel John Gower described him as a shadow hanging over the trial, leaving “a nasty smell” over the proceedings. Julian Cayo-Evans, Dennis Coslett (who refused to speak English throughout the trial), Gethin ap Gruffydd, Toni Lewis, Vivian Davies and Vernon Griffiths were all convicted; Cayo-Evans and Coslett served 15 months in prison. Dai Bonar Thomas and Glyn Rowlands were both cleared of charges related to organising the group, as was David John Underhill. All of the defendants agreed to sign assurances vowing that they would renounce future violence and political extremism in return for reduced sentences, with the exception of Gethin ap Gruffydd, who refused to sign any such declaration. Immediately following the sentencing, Coslett made a speech from the dock in which he stated that he been trained and instructed in the use of violence by the British Army, further claiming that "English violence" was considered virtuous, but "Welsh violence" a terrible crime. Following its conclusion, the trial had cost taxpayers £130,000, £70,000 less than the cost of the investiture ceremony. Present at the trial was Saunders Lewis, a founding member and former president of Plaid Cymru. Lewis had himself been among "the Three" convicted for arson during the Tân yn Llŷn (lit. 'fire in Llŷn') protest at Penyberth in 1936. Allegedly, Lewis "never forgave" Gwynfor Evans, for refusing to attend the trial or show support for the FWA men.

== Ideology ==
Welsh nationalism and republicanism was the central unifying ideology of the Free Wales Army, though the organisation was characterised as lacking a "mature and effective political programme" by Wyn Thomas. The group reportedly had no formal constitution and no official rules governing membership or subscriptions. For a period, the National Patriotic Front served as a political wing of the paramilitary, although the relationship was intermittent and gave rise to strategic disagreements and occasional public disavowals, including in 1966. Accounts differ on the political views of the group's membership, suggesting a broad coalition of differing perspectives. Julian Cayo-Evans was firmly right-wing and anti-communist in his outlook, as Dennis Coslett allegedly was; however, John Humphries claimed that Coslett displayed photographs of socialist revolutionaries at his home in Llangennech, including Fidel Castro, Che Guevara and Mao Zedong. In the case of Cayo-Evans, this was reportedly linked to his British Army service fighting communist guerrillas during the Malayan Emergency. Cayo-Evans' social background and political outlook secured the FWA the support of Saunders Lewis and Robert O. F. Wynne, the aristocratic owner of Garthewin Hall near Llanfair Talhaiarn. However, Lyn Ebenezer has claimed on numerous occasions that the bulk of the organisation's membership were left-wing, stating in Charles and the Welsh Revolt:

And it was there [in Malaya] I think he got this business of being on the Right politically. Because most of the FWA lads, almost without exception, they were from the Left - especially those from the south, areas like Merthyr and Pontypridd. Only Cayo and Coslett, I would say, were on the Right and hated Communism. Cayo, of course, had been fighting Communism in Malaya and he had bad memories of things they had done. But what was strange was that these other guys were great friends with him despite their political differences — people like David Burns, and a guy called 'Gun' from Merthyr. For some reason they got on well together.

Ebenezer's account is supported by Gethin ap Gruffydd's political career. Following his release from prison for his involvement in the Free Wales Army, ap Gruffydd went on to establish a number of socialist republican organisations, including the Welsh Socialist Vanguard (WSV) and Cymru Goch (lit. 'red Wales'). Anarchist activist Ian Bone was living in Swansea during this period and later became associated with ap Gruffydd in the early 1970s. He described his analysis of the group in his autobiography, in which he referred to ap Gruffydd as "Gethyn ap Iestyn", stating:

...Gethyn proved to be a solid socialist, if firmly of the Leninist variety, giving the lie to the belief that all the FWA members had been right wing semi-fascists. In fact, Gethyn ap Iestyn was probably the only person within the FWA who had some idea how to build a political movement. He'd started to build up an anti-investiture campaign and proved to be an honourable and committed revolutionary and still remains so.

Bone further described the FWA's membership as "overwhelmingly proletarian", in contrast to the predominantly middle-class composition of many leftist organisations of the period. Harri Webb, who had initially evoked the organisation and designed its symbolism, later referred to its members as "lumpen proletarian romantics"; he instead became active in Mudiad Amddiffyn Cymru.

== International links ==
=== Irish Republican Army ===
Shortly after the disorder at the Llyn Celyn opening ceremony and the ensuing media attention, Julian Cayo-Evans told the Daily Mail that the FWA had established links with the IRA, a claim published by the paper in November 1965. Around the same time, Cayo-Evans made similar remarks to the Western Mail, drawing parallels between the armed conflict in Ireland and the situation in Wales, stating that he regarded “militant nationalism as a matter not to be taken lightly.” The FWA was rumoured to have received arms from the Official IRA (OIRA), although Cayo-Evans later denied this. In Ireland, one rumour that was used against the OIRA by its rivals within Irish republicanism was that the OIRA had given or sold most of its weapons to the FWA as part of its turn away from political violence, leaving it defenceless when intercommunal violence erupted in Northern Ireland in August 1969. Scott Millar, co-author of The Lost Revolution: The Story of the OIRA and the Workers' Party, wrote that there was contact between the two groups, including FWA members training in Ireland, but that no large-scale transfer of arms took place. Cayo-Evans similarly claimed that the IRA had been "a great help" in training members of the FWA in the use of weapons and explosives at training camps in Ireland. Police took claims of links with Irish republicans seriously, resulting in a raid on Cayo-Evans' Glandenys estate on 20 October 1966 following an anonymous tip-off that IRA members were present. Eamon O'Higgins and Rory O'Scanlon were found and questioned during the raid, and subsequent police correspondence with An Garda Síochána in Ireland revealed that both men were known IRA members. A Garda Chief Superintendent informed British police that undercover Garda officers had monitored Cayo-Evans in Dublin two months earlier, where he was observed entering a hotel with O'Scanlon before returning to Wales shortly after.

In April 1966, the FWA accepted an invitation from Sinn Féin to participate in unofficial celebrations of the Semicentennial of the Easter Rising in Dublin. Wishing to put on a good display for the event, Cayo-Evans implored the organisation's membership and supporters to attend and succeeded in mustering a uniformed turnout for the parade. Present at the official celebrations was Cymdeithas yr Iaith Gymraeg (Welsh Language Society), whose prominent members were reported to have distanced themselves from the FWA and the unofficial march organised by Sinn Féin, an action that allegedly led to an incident in which Cayo-Evans threatened Dafydd Iwan. During an interview with Wyn Thomas in 2000, Dennis Coslett recounted how he and Cayo-Evans were first introduced to the IRA over the course of the weekend. According to Coslett, the pair were met by an IRA volunteer in the evening, who took them by taxi to the British Embassy in Dublin and proceeded to smash a number of windows with a volley of stones. The weekend’s celebrations concluded with further antics when the FWA contingent returning to Wales on the Dún Laoghaire to Fishguard ferry tore down the Union Jack flying from the ship's deck and raised the Welsh flag in its place, reportedly to cheers from fellow passengers. Coslett also claimed that during the incident aboard the ferry, a member of the group entered the ship’s bridge and announced over the loudspeaker that the FWA had seized the vessel and was sailing it to Y Wladfa (lit. 'the colony'), the Welsh-speaking colony in Patagonia.

=== International Celtic Army ===
In addition to its Irish connections, the Free Wales Army cultivated close ties with other Celtic nationalist movements and advocated the creation of a unified "International Celtic Army", also referred to as the "Celtic Guard". Meetings between these organisations were typically held at the Glandenys estate of Julian Cayo-Evans and included representatives of the Scottish Liberation Army (SLA) and the Breton Liberation Front (FLB). Arrangements included a shared network of safe houses and plans for coordinated actions between the groups. Yann Fouéré, who served on the FLB's état-major ('general staff'), was among those who maintained contacts with the FWA. The organisation issued a medal known as the "Celtic Cross" to its members for "valour in the field", which Dennis Coslett was allegedly awarded. Other movements are said to have attended meetings with Cayo-Evans, including Basque, Flemish, Manx, Québécois nationalists, as well as the Palestine Liberation Organization (PLO).

== Symbolism ==
The Free Wales Army's motto was "Fe godwn ni eto" (lit. 'we shall rise again'). Its adopted symbol, Yr Eryr Wen, was a shorthand heraldic white eagle that adorned the flags and uniforms of the organisation, which had been designed in 1952 by Harri Webb. Drawing on the ancient Welsh poetic tradition, the eagle is intended to represent the eagles of Snowdonia, which in Welsh mythology are said to protect Wales. This symbolism features in Llywarch ap Llywelyn's 13th century poem, Mab Darogan. Translated from Middle Welsh into English, the poem reads: "Myrddin's prophecy is that a king shall come with heroism from among the Welsh people. Prophets have said that generous men shall be reborn of the lineage of the eagles of Snowdonia." This symbolism has been associated with Owain ap Gruffudd (c. 1100-1170), commonly known as Owain Gwynedd, to whom a coat of arms bearing three golden eagles was retroactively attributed. In 2012, these arms were officially adopted as the flag of Caernarfonshire. Owain ruled the Kingdom of Gwynedd during the 12th century and successfully resisted Henry II's attempted Anglo-Norman expansion into Wales at the Battle of Ewloe in July 1157. During an interview by ITN in July 1966, Julian Cayo-Evans described the symbol as deriving from a legend that the eagles of Snowdonia would warn the people of Wales when English forces were approaching. Being a skilled metalworker, Toni Lewis adapted the symbol into metal insignia that were affixed to the caps of FWA members.

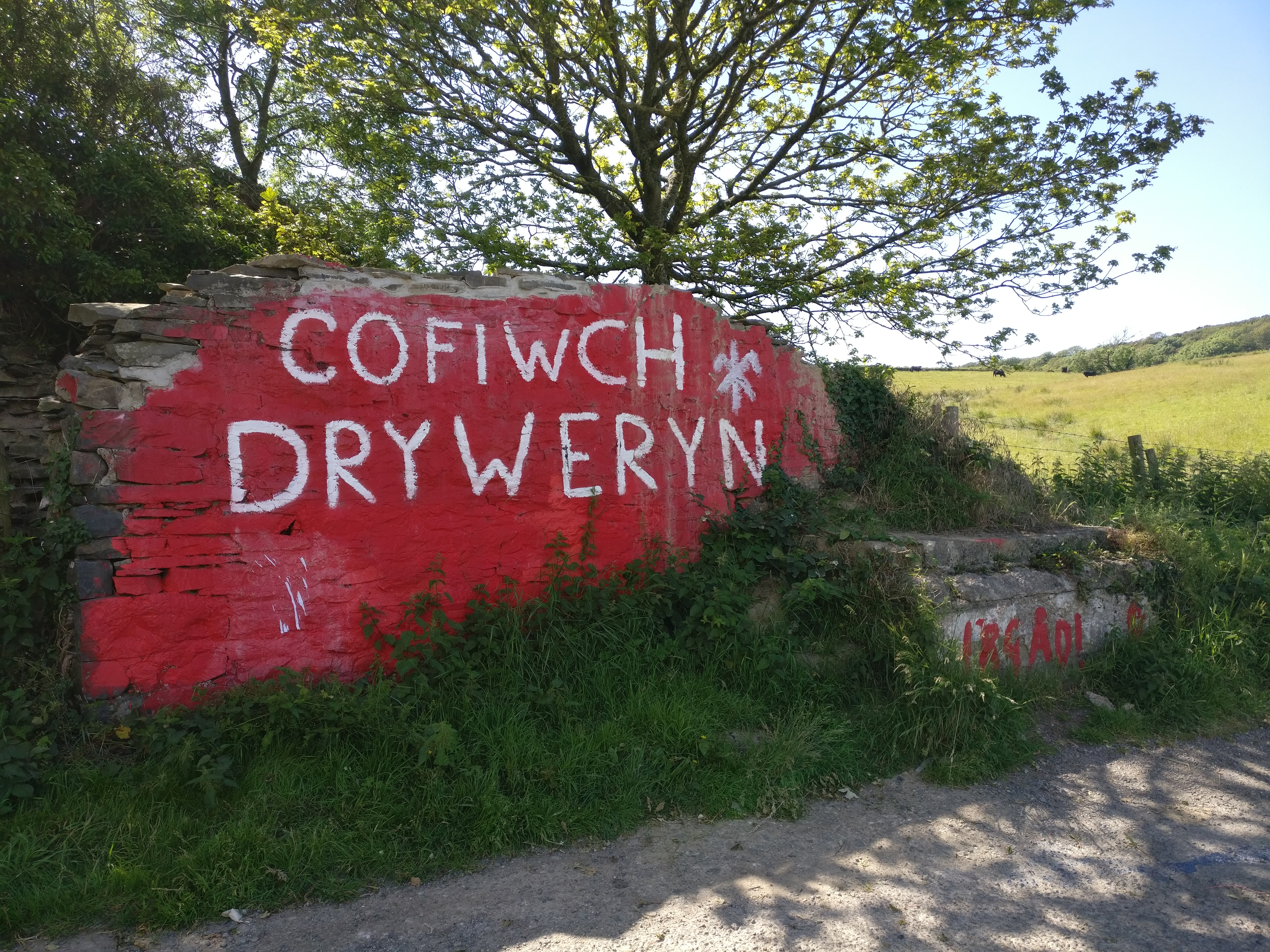
The Cofiwch Dryweryn mural near Llanrhystud, Ceredigion. Yr Eryr Wen is visible on the top right of the wall, photographed in 2019.

While the FWA adopted Yr Eryr Wen, the paramilitary's association with the symbol has seen its legacy endure into the present day. During the Meibion Glyndŵr (Sons of Glyndŵr) arson campaign throughout the 1980s and 1990s, the symbol was often seen as graffiti or daubed on the ruins of burnt-out holiday homes. Dewi Prysor, who was arrested on suspicion of involvement with Meibion Glyndŵr, recalled that during his teenage years in Blaenau Ffestiniog in the 1970s, tattoos of Yr Eryr Wen became prominent, and the symbol was frequently painted alongside MAC and FWA slogans at his school and on the walls of the gym. In July 1989, members of Parti Lliw Meibion Glyndŵr (lit. 'Meibion Glyndŵr colour party') marched through Abergele in paramilitary-style uniforms bearing a patch depicting a heraldic white eagle, in commemoration of MAC members Alwyn Jones and George Taylor, who were killed in 1969 when a bomb they were planting detonated prematurely. Nationalist murals across Wales frequently feature the symbol, the most notable of these being the Cofiwch Dryweryn ('remember Tryweryn') mural near Llanrhystud, Ceredigion. More recently, the symbol has returned to prominence as a result of the socialist republican youth movement, Mudiad Eryr Wen (lit. 'movement of the white eagle'). In addition to adopting both its namesake and its symbolism, the movement has painted the symbol on defaced English-language road signs on numerous occasions.

== Legacy ==
In 2000, the Apollo Hotel on Cathedral Road in Cardiff was rebranded by brewers Tomos Watkins as the Cayo Arms in reference to Julian Cayo-Evans, and a hanging pub sign in his likeness was displayed outside the front of the pub. The branding decision drew criticism from Conservative Assembly Member (AM) for South Wales Central, Jonathan Morgan, who said that "the disruptive antics of Welsh nationalists should be consigned to the dustbin." Tomos Watkins defended the decision at the time, and the company's managing director, Simon Buckley, described Cayo-Evans as “a Robin Hood character of the late 1960s”. However, the pub later closed for refurbishment and was subsequently reopened in 2018 as the Pontcanna Inn by the City Pub Company.

In 2005, the Western Mail published police reports from The National Archives, which asserted that Cayo-Evans had a "mental age of 12", and that Coslett was "unbalanced". John Owen Evans, who was heavily involved in the police surveillance of the organisation and the arrests of its leadership, reached this conclusion largely due to Cayo-Evans' alleged fascination with repairing and firing starting pistols "just to see the smoke go up". Ian Bone claimed that such an incident involving a starting pistol had occurred during a Plaid Cymru meeting in the lead-up to the 1967 Rhondda West by-election, when Dennis Coslett, dressed in uniform, discharged the pistol on the stage and was subsequently blamed for costing the party the election. These claims have been disputed by those close to the men, with writer and artist Rhobert ap Steffan stating in 2005:

Cayo was a highly intelligent man and Dennis was well loved in his home town of Llanelli, it's ridiculous to call them undeveloped or unbalanced. They were both tough guys who did not suffer fools but to call them that is over the top. I would expect a thing like that — ridiculing the enemy — but I had tremendous respect for both of them and Cayo was a fabulous individual, one of the last great characters of West Wales.

In the same Wales Online article, Meic Stephens responded to the police analysis of the matter with the following comment:

I did not really know Coslett but I met Cayo several times and I don't remember him being retarded, I always found him a charming lad and great company late at night. He always seemed to have a sunny temperament and he was a wonderful accordion player. We talked about horses most of the time and he seemed to be perfectly ordinary and normal.

In 2015, the group was satirically depicted in an episode of Archer, an American adult animated sitcom on FX, which humorously referenced the flooding of Tryweryn.
