= Silian Halt railway station =

Former railway station in Wales

Silian Halt

General information
- Location: Silian, Ceredigion; Wales
- Coordinates: 52.1386°N 4.0736°W
- Grid reference: SN5818850951
- Platforms: 1

Other information
- Status: Disused

History
- Original company: Lampeter, Aberayron and New Quay Light Railway
- Pre-grouping: Lampeter, Aberayron and New Quay Light Railway
- Post-grouping: Great Western Railway

Key dates
- 12 May 1911: Station opens
- 12 February 1951: Station closes (last train)
- 7 May 1951: Station closes (official)
- 1963: Line closed for general freight
- 1 October 1973: Line closed for milk traffic
Location

The Silian Halt railway station was a small railway station at Silian, the first stop after the junction on the Aberayron branch of the Carmarthen to Aberystwyth Line in the Welsh county of Ceredigion. Opened by the Lampeter, Aberayron and New Quay Light Railway. The branch diverged from the through line at Lampeter.

== History ==
The branch was incorporated into the Great Western Railway during the Grouping of 1923, passing on to the Western Region of British Railways on nationalisation in 1948. Passenger services were discontinued in 1951, general freight in 1963 and milk traffic in 1973. The single brick-built platform still survives, unlike others on the line which were built from wooden railway sleepers. The track was lifted in the summer of 1975.

Preceding station	Disused railways	Following station
Lampeter	Great Western Railway; Lampeter, Aberayron and New Quay Light Railway	Blaenplwyf
