= Harri Webb =

Welsh poet

Personal details
- Born: Harry Webb; 7 September 1920 Swansea, Wales
- Died: 31 December 1994 (aged 74) Swansea, Wales
- Party: Plaid Cymru
- Other political affiliations: Mudiad Amddiffyn Cymru; Welsh Republican Movement; Welsh Labour
- Education: University of Oxford
- Profession: Poet, journalist, librarian, activist

Military service
- Branch/service: Royal Navy
- Years of service: 1941-1946
- Battles/wars: World War II; Battle of the Atlantic; Battle of the Mediterranean

Harri Webb (born Harry Webb; 7 September 1920 – 31 December 1994) was a Welsh poet, journalist and librarian, and a prominent Welsh republican nationalist.

== Early life ==
Harri Webb, baptised Harry Webb, was born on 7 September 1920 at 45 Tŷ Coch Road in Sketty, Swansea. Before he was two years old, his family moved to Catherine Street, closer to the city centre. Webb grew up in a working-class environment in the docklands of Swansea. He attended Oxford Street and Glanmôr Secondary Boys' School, where he was said to be an exceptional pupil.

In 1938, he was the first from his school to win a local education authority scholarship, and went to the Magdalen College of the University of Oxford to study languages, specialising in French, Spanish and Portuguese – a period of his life to which he made virtually no reference in his writings. However, he later described this period as one during which he "worked, got drunk and learned how to smoke". While he was at university, his studies were negatively affected by the death of his mother; he graduated with a third-class degree in 1941.

== World War II ==
After the outbreak of World War II, Webb volunteered to serve in the Royal Navy and applied his language skills as an interpreter. This included work with the Free French in the Mediterranean, with periods in Algeria, Palestine and Libya during the Battle of the Mediterranean. In 1942, Webb was on board HMS Tetcott, the final ship to escape Tobruk before the city fell to the advancing Afrika Korps. In later life, he recounted his terrifying experience of being dive-bombed at sea during the escape. In addition, he saw action in the North Atlantic during the Battle of the Atlantic.

Following the conclusion of the war, Webb was demobilised in Scotland in 1946. It was during his shore leave in the country that he became familiar with the work of Hugh MacDiarmid, a controversial Scottish nationalist and Marxist poet. Webb had displayed little interest in politics up to this stage in his life; however, MacDiarmid's work proved to be the catalyst for his own burgeoning Welsh republicanism.

== Return to Wales ==
Following his return to Wales in 1947, his life was outwardly uneventful. For some eight years he worked in temporary jobs, including working for the journalist Keidrych Rhys in Carmarthen, and a brief period as a librarian in Cheltenham. As Webb became increasingly involved in poetry and politics, he adopted the Welsh spelling Harri for his name in 1950.

In July 1950, Webb became managing editor of Y Gweriniaethwr ('The Republican'), the newspaper of the Welsh Republican Movement (WRM). Within its first few years of publication, the paper reportedly reached a circulation of around 2,000 copies. Two years later, on 5 October 1952, Webb represented the WRM delegation at the Celtic Alliance march from Hyde Park to Trafalgar Square in London. He addressed the crowd at Nelson's Column alongside representatives from Plaid Cymru, Sinn Féin and the Scottish National Party (SNP).

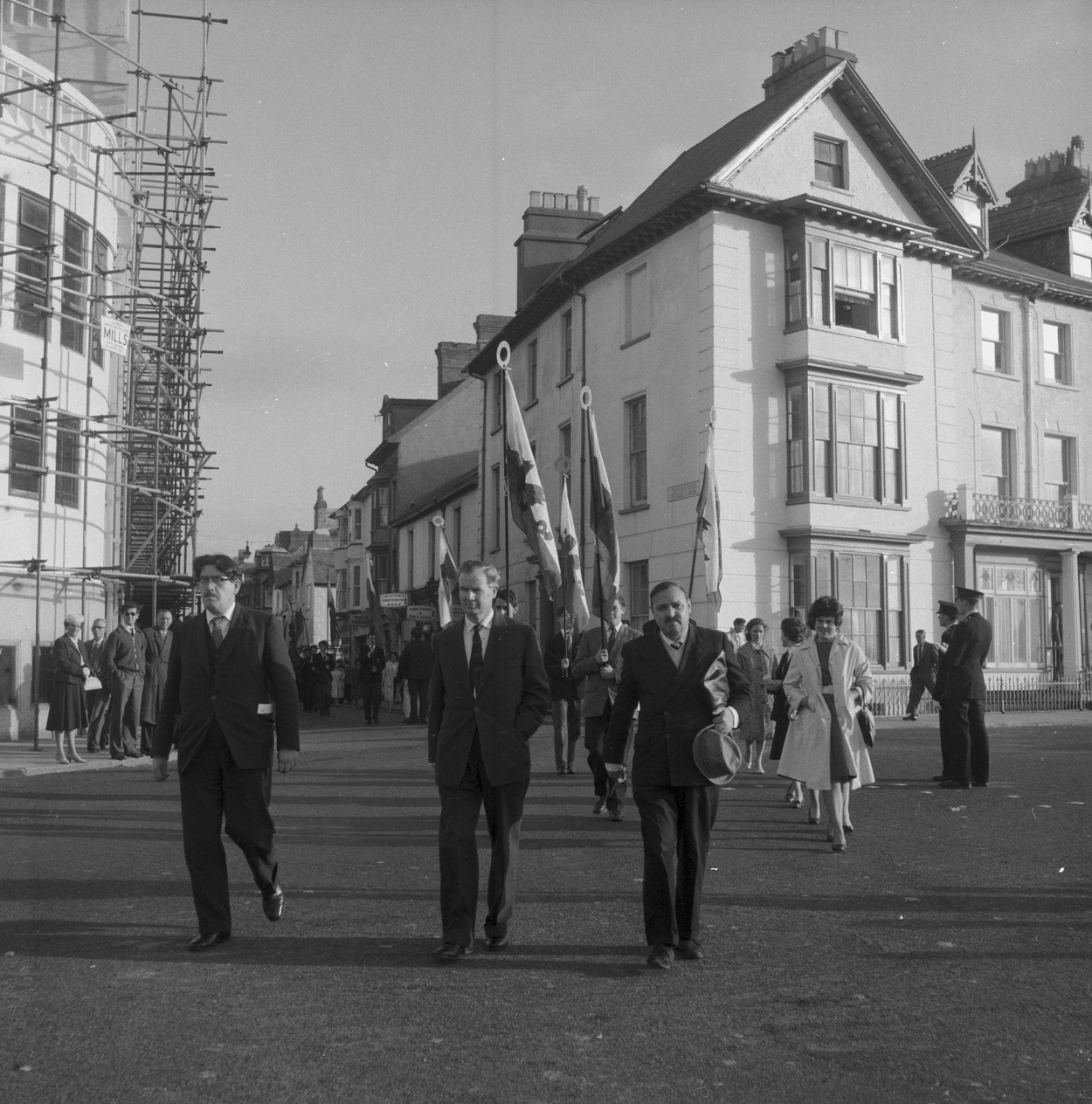
Harri Webb (right) marches alongside Gwynfor Evans (centre) during Plaid Cymru's annual rally in Aberystwyth, 5 October 1961

In 1954, Webb moved to Merthyr Tydfil to work as librarian in its Dowlais area and, in his own words, to fully absorb himself into the national experience. Two years later he published Dic Penderyn and the Merthyr Rising of 1831, a pamphlet in which he somewhat imaginatively retells the story of the rebellion. While in Merthyr Tydfil, Webb lived in the squat Garth Newydd, an old house that had been given to the town during the Great Depression, and subsequently seemingly belonged to nobody; when Webb first moved in it was occupied by a group of pacifists. He lived in the house with Meic Stephens and others, which became something of a nationalist commune, from where the Free Wales pirate radio station was broadcast.

During his time at Garth Newydd, Webb, together with Stephens, promoted the concept of a “Free Wales Army” and devised the "White Eagle of Snowdonia" symbol, often referred to by its Welsh name Yr Eryr Wen (lit. 'the white eagle'). This precipitated the formation of the Free Wales Army (FWA) in the early 1960s, which emerged from the amalgamation of several small nationalist groups from across Wales. In addition to adopting the name, the paramilitary organisation also adopted Webb's White Eagle of Snowdonia as its symbol. Despite his significant indirect contribution to the organisation's establishment, Webb never became involved with it and later described its members in his writings as "lumpen proletarian romantics".

After his return to Plaid Cymru in 1960, he remained at odds with the party’s pacifism, and its refusal to condone direct action. In 1964 he became associated with the New Nation/Cilmeri Group, composed of disaffected party members, mainly republicans and nationalists such as Emrys Roberts and John Legonna. The group sought to reform the party’s organisation, reinvigorate its policies and tactics, and remove some of its leaders, including the president, Gwynfor Evans. Webb became a well-connected figure within Plaid Cymru and even served as a policy adviser to the militant organisation Mudiad Amddiffyn Cymru (lit. 'movement for the defence of Wales'; MAC), at one point offering its leader, John Barnard Jenkins, the opportunity to establish formal links between the group and the Breton Liberation Front. Webb's involvement in MAC remained unknown until long after his death, coming to public attention with the publication of Freedom Fighters: Wales's Forgotten War, 1963–1993 by former Western Mail journalist John Humphries in 2008. In the book, Humphries includes an excerpt from a conversation with John Jenkins about Harri Webb, in which Jenkins stated:

I realised very early on that we could not operate in a political vacuum. We needed someone like Harri Webb who could keep us informed about what was happening. Webb was recommended by a trusted member of the organisation as someone, a political adviser we could bounce ideas off. He moved in respectable circles whereas we couldn't. The important thing for me was to delegate certain things. His function was one of those...

After working in Dowlais for ten years 'In defiance of any rational career structure', in 1964 Webb began work at Mountain Ash Library in the Cynon Valley which previously had been the largest borough in Wales without a public library service. He made innovations such as lending LPs, and buying books and periodicals to appeal to a female readership who were gaining more independence in this era, to some criticism from those wary of modernisation. He continued to work for Mountain Ash Library until 1974. The library has a memorial plaque dedicated to Webb that was installed in 1997 reading: "poet and librarian, bardd a llyfrgellydd, 1920-1994", which was unveiled by Meic Stephens and Gwilym Prys Davies.

== Written work ==
Following Gwynfor Evans' victory in the 1966 Carmarthen by-election, Webb authored the poem "Colli Iaith", which was subsequently composed as a song by Meredydd Evans and later performed and recorded by Heather Jones in 1971.

Webb's first collection of poetry, The Green Desert, was published in 1969. Webb carried on living in Garth Newydd and commuting to the next valley until 1972, when he moved to Cwmbach near Aberdare, before finally retiring in 1974, the year that A Crown For Branwen appeared.

This was followed by Rampage and Revel in 1977, and finally Poems and Points in 1983, soon after which Webb virtually ceased to write poetry, suffering a serious stroke in 1985.

Webb's poetry is marked by his radical Welsh nationalist politics and a quasi-Christian sensibility. In form it was often simple and comic, in order that it might influence a wide audience.

== Later life ==
Webb remained in Cwmbach before moving into a nursing home in Swansea shortly before his death on New Year's Eve 1994. His funeral was held on 6 January 1995 at St. Mary's Church in Pennard, Gower, where his grave is to be found.

== Memorials ==
In addition to the plaque at Mountain Ash Library Ty Harri Webb on Dyffryn Road in Mountain Ash is named after Webb on the same road as the old library.

Merthyr Tydfil Library have also held activities to celebrate Webb's life and promote young people's poetry in their programming.

A ceremony was held at Webb's grave marking 100 years since his birth on 7 September 2020 by Guto Ap Gwent and Prys Morgan amongst others.

== Bibliography ==
- Dic Penderyn and the Merthyr Rising of 1831 (1956) OCLC 815680381
- [with M. Stephens, P. Griffith] Triad (1963)
- Our National Anthem (1964)
- The Green Desert: collected poems 1950-1969 (1969; repr. 1976)
- A Crown for Branwen (1974)
- Rampage and Revel (1977)
- Poems and Points (1983)
- Tales from Wales (1984)
- Collected Poems, ed. M. Stephens (1995)
- No Halfway House: selected political journalism 1950-1977, ed. M. Stephens (1997)
- A Militant Muse (1998)
- Looking up England's arsehole, ed. M. Stephens (2000)
- The Stone Face and other poems, ed. M. Stephens (2005)
