= Silian, Ceredigion =

Village in Ceredigion, Wales

Coordinates: 52°08′27″N 4°5′28″W

Silian
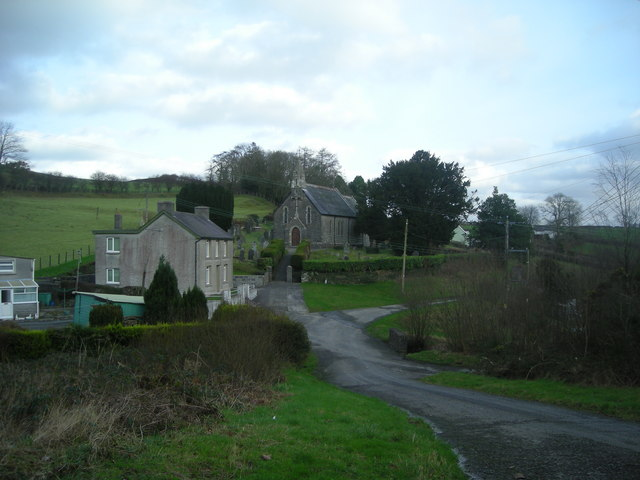

- Location within Ceredigion
- OS grid reference: SN568505
- Principal area: Ceredigion
- Preserved county: Dyfed
- Country: Wales
- Sovereign state: United Kingdom
- Post town: LAMPETER
- Postcode district: SA48
- Dialling code: 01570
- Police: Dyfed-Powys
- Fire: Mid and West Wales
- Ambulance: Welsh
- UK Parliament: Ceredigion Preseli

Silian, originally Sulien, is a village in the valley of the River Teifi, Ceredigion, Wales. It is located approximately two miles north-west of Lampeter, on a minor road connecting Pont Creuddun on the A482, and Glan Denys on the A485.

In January 2014, permission was granted for a wind turbine in Silian, in the face of strong local opposition. The county council, deciding a site visit for an area that is home to rare red kite birds was not required, were enthusiastic to help "secure local business." Alarmed at the proliferation of successful applications for wind turbines throughout the county, one councillor at the planning meeting was moved to declare "we are in danger of turning all of Ceredigion into a giant wind farm."

Silian is also the name of the parish, which takes its name from Saint Sulien, to whom the village church is consecrated. Bethel Chapel was built in Silian in 1654, and renovated in 1952.

Julian Cayo-Evans (1937–1995), the Welsh nationalist and leader of the Free Wales Army, was born in Silian.

Silian Halt was on the Lampeter, Aberayron and New Quay Light Railway, opening in 1911 and closing to passengers in 1951.

A local Welsh language paper, Llais Aeron, covers the area. Self-catering accommodation and B&Bs are available in the village, which is conveniently situated for visiting the towns of Lampeter, Aberaeron and Aberystwyth.

Ownership of the 1856 school, which closed in 1976, has since been a cause of legal contention. Villagers were proposing to buy the premises for redevelopment as a community resource centre. The building was sold at auction in 2016 to a private buyer. More bad news was to follow when the church no longer had the support of the local Canon, who gave the casting vote effectively ending 1,500 years of worship after insurers requested that structural repairs be carried out.

Close to Silian is Falcondale Lake, a haven for wildlife and, until relatively recently, a Site of Special Scientific Interest. A small stream drains from the lake, passing under the A482 before joining Nant Creuddyn and then the Afon Teifi. Many species of birds and butterflies can be seen around the lake, some of which come from Deri-goch Wood, immediately to the north west. Deri-goch Wood, under protection from Natural Resources Wales (NRW), is also teeming with wildlife and a number of interesting plants, having recovered from being the dumping ground of a local farmer's slurry over a number of years.
