= Ithel Davies =

Welsh political activist and barrister

Ithel Davies (1894 – 1989) was a Welsh political activist and barrister.

Born in Aberystwyth, Davies was a conscientious objector during World War I. He joined the Labour Party, and stood unsuccessfully for it in the University of Wales seat at the 1935 United Kingdom general election. From 1934 until 1936, Davies served on the executive of the Socialist League.

During World War II, Davies and D. N. Pritt worked together to obtain the release of T. E. Nicholas, a conscientious objector who had been falsely accused of being a fascist. After the war, Davies became active in the Welsh nationalist movement. He became the leading figure in the Welsh Republican Movement, a split from Plaid Cymru, and stood for it in Ogmore at the 1950 United Kingdom general election, taking only 1.3% of the vote.
