= John Cayo Evans =

Welsh mathematician (1879–1958)

John Cayo Evans (1 March 1879 – 8 March 1958) was a Welsh mathematician and academic.

== Life ==
Evans was born on 1 March 1879 (St David's Day) at Blaenau-Caio farm, in the village of Ffarmers, Wales. He was educated locally before attending St David's College School, Lampeter, Wales. He then went on to study at University College, Aberystwyth and Jesus College, Oxford. At Oxford, he obtained first-class degrees in mathematics (1901) and Natural Science (1903). He was a member of the Indian Educational Service from 1905 to 1922 before being appointed Professor of Mathematics at St David's College, Lampeter (later renamed the University of Wales, Lampeter). He was High Sheriff of Cardiganshire for the year 1941 to 1942. He died on 8 March 1958. Evans was an early member of Plaid Cymru; one of his two sons was the political activist Julian Cayo-Evans.
