= Dennis Coslett =

Welsh political activist

- Dafydd ap Coslett, Denis Coslett
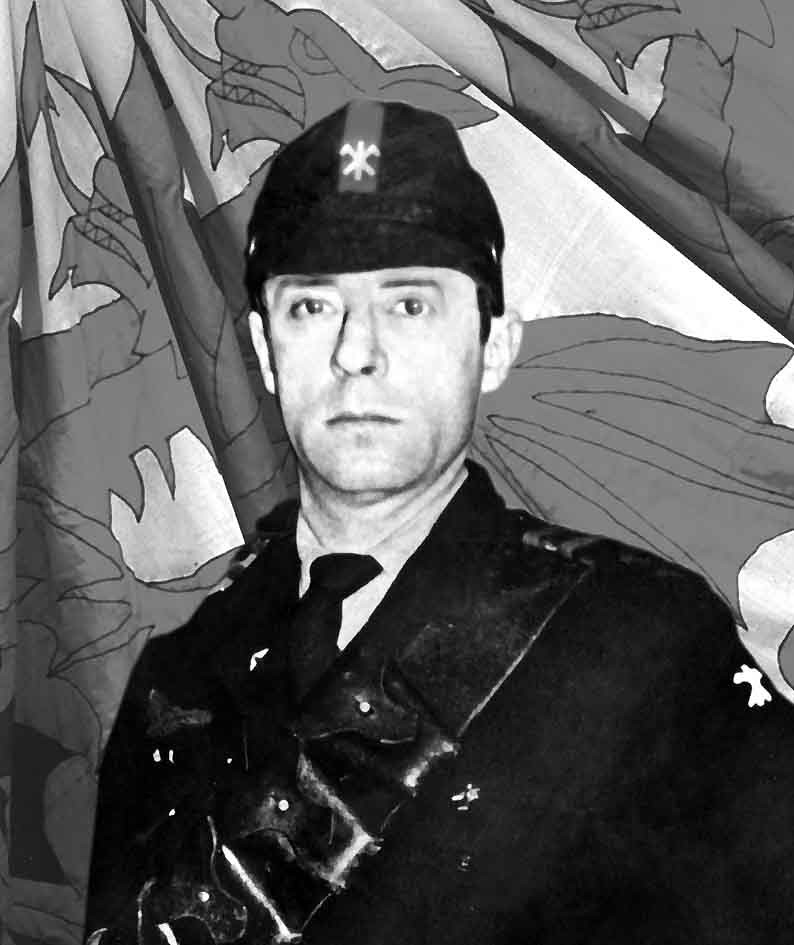
- Coslett in 1965
- Born: Dennis Coslett; 12 September 1939; Carmarthen, Wales
- Died: 20 May 2004 (aged 64); Llanelli, Wales
- Spouse: Avril Webb (m. 1963)
- Children: 3
- Military career
- Allegiance: Free Wales Army
- Branch: British Army; Merchant Navy
- Nickname: "Dai Dayan"
- Unit: Royal Welch Fusiliers
- Known for: Commandant of the Free Wales Army
- Other work: Poet; Essayist; Writer

Dennis Coslett (12 September 1939 – 20 May 2004) was a Welsh nationalist political activist, best known as being a member and self-styled commandant of the paramilitary Free Wales Army (FWA), who became notorious in Wales throughout the 1960s.

== Biography ==
=== Early life ===
Born in Carmarthen, Coslett was conscripted at the age of 18. He served in the British Army as an infantryman with the Royal Welch Fusiliers and later became a seaman in the Merchant Navy. On his return to Wales, Coslett worked as a shot-firer in many of the small private coal mines in west Wales. He went on to lose the use of his left eye in an accident underground, and subsequently lost his job. Coslett married Avril Webb in 1963, and the couple had a daughter and two sons.

=== Free Wales Army ===
The flooding of Capel Celyn and destruction of Welsh-speaking communities had sparked controversy in Wales during the 1960s. Many Welsh nationalists, including Coslett, became frustrated by the refusal of Plaid Cymru to take a tougher stance on the matter. Coslett initially set up his own militant group, the Welsh Republican Army (WRA), but in 1965, he joined forces with Julian Cayo-Evans as part of the FWA. The pair were interviewed on ITV's David Frost Show in 1967. Frost made a number of facetious comments, and referred to Coslett as "Dai Dayan" because of his resemblance to Moshe Dayan, the Israeli general who also wore a patch over his left eye. Frost's remark irritated Coslett, and an argument ensued during the broadcast, which was interrupted when a drunken man walked across the stage. Both Coslett and Cayo-Evans were adept at courting the media and publicising their gatherings, which were essentially harmless. The Free Wales Army was also quite happy to take the credit for acts of protest committed by other organisations, such as explosions, damage to holiday cottages owned by English people and the defacing or destruction of English-language road signs. Most notably, this included the actions of Mudiad Amddiffyn Cymru (lit. 'movement for the defence of Wales'; MAC), from whom Coslett had once received explosives that were used in a failed FWA bombing of a water pipeline near Llandrindod Wells connecting the Elan Valley Reservoirs to Birmingham in 1967.

Coslett claimed that police officers assigned to monitor the FWA "loved it", suggesting that there was a degree of "prestige" associated with the assignment. However, he regarded Detective Chief Inspector John Owen Evans as a nemesis and narrowly avoided arrest following an incident in which he punched the officer at his family home. According to Coslett, he discovered Evans searching Avril Webb's handbag in the living room after the officer had arrived at the house to arrest him on a firearms offence. Coslett had left Evans unattended while he went to put on his FWA uniform. On another occasion on 9 May 1968, Coslett was arrested for assaulting a police officer during an incident involving Rhobert ap Steffan. The pair were alleged to have been caught pouring sand into the petrol tank of a police car in Aberystwyth and were subsequently apprehended by police. Ap Steffan denied the offence, but claimed he was severely beaten by police while in custody. Coslett later conceded to Wyn Thomas that, although he was also beaten in custody, he "probably asked for it." Coslett was later fined £25 for the assault, although a charge of wilfully damaging a police station window was dropped. The incident was publicised in the National Patriotic Front's (NPF) newspaper, Y Ffrynt ('The Front'), which described it as an instance of police aggression towards the pair.

Fundamentally, the Coslett and the FWA's self-publicity led to their imprisonment, as the police were under pressure to respond to protests and threats of violence preceding the investiture of Prince Charles at Caernarfon. Many members of the Free Wales Army were subsequently charged with various offences, including Coslett and Cayo-Evans; the latter faced eight charges under the Public Order Act at the trial in Swansea in May 1969. The trial lasted 53 days, with Coslett refusing to speak in English throughout the hearing. He and Cayo-Evans were each sentenced to 15 months' imprisonment on 1 July 1969, although the case rested on little more than press cuttings, including exaggerated claims which Cayo-Evans and Coslett had themselves uttered to journalists. Presiding over the case was Judge Thompson, who questioned Coslett over his claim that the FWA had trained dogs attached with explosives to attack advancing "English tanks". Allegedly, with a smile, the judge enquired, "How were they to remove the pins?", which was met with laughter from the public gallery. Reportedly, with confidence, Coslett responded, "Damn, you've got me there, sir." Coslett's claims typically centred around his beloved Alsatian, Gelert, named in homage to the Gelert of Welsh legend. However, he had also made extravagant claims of having dozens more trained dogs hidden in the hills of northern Carmarthenshire, where the FWA often conducted manoeuvres. The court evidence for the claim came from a journalist, who claimed that Coslett had once demonstrated to him how a harness, which he claimed was capable of storing sticks of gelignite, could be fitted to Gelert's back in the event of a Welsh uprising. Both The Herald of Wales and The Daily Telegraph had reported on the claim of "kamikaze dogs" at the time, allegedly resulting in Coslett receiving hundreds of letters from enraged dog-lovers.

=== Post-Free Wales Army ===
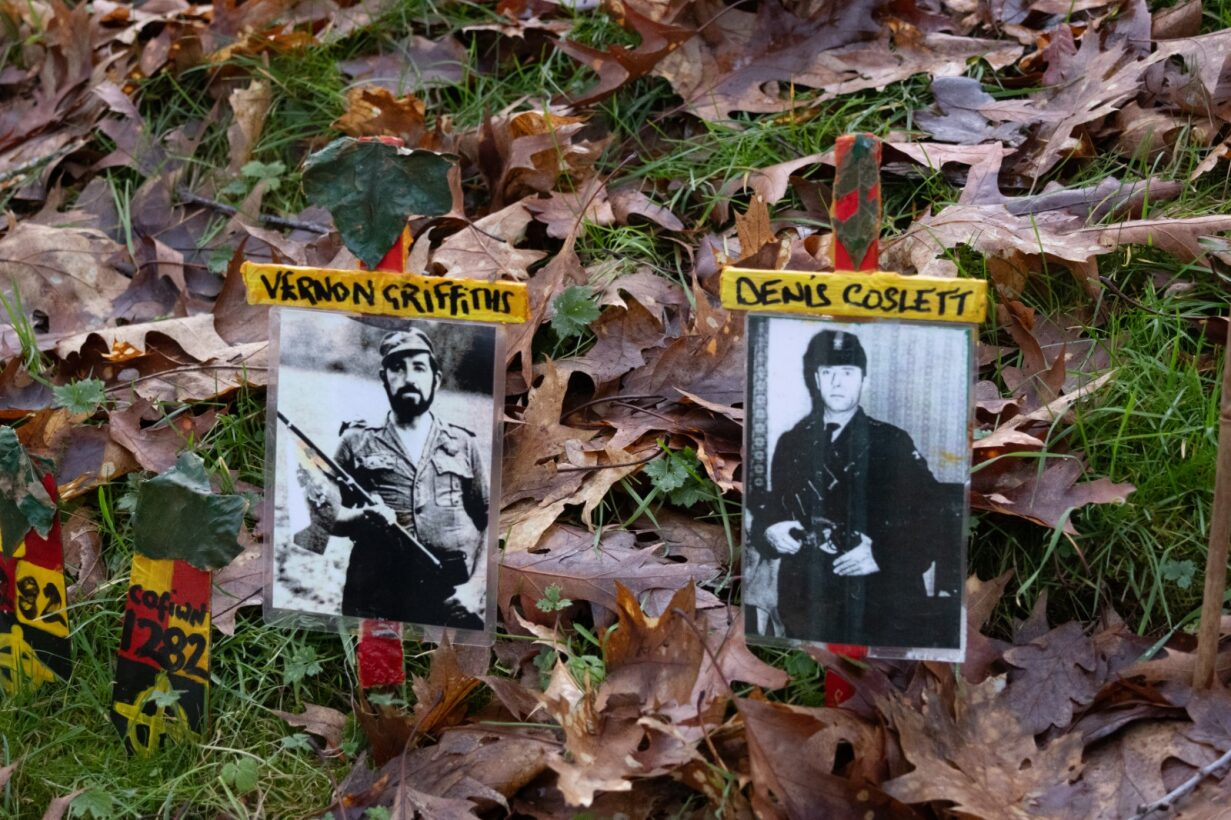
Nationalist tribute photos of Dennis Coslett and Vernon Griffiths at Llywelyn's memorial stone in Cilmeri, December 2025

Following his release from prison, Coslett began his new career as a poet, essayist and speaker, publishing two books, Rebel Heart and Patriots and Scoundrels. His published poetic collection comprises a wide range of subject matters, but typically share the theme of armed struggle against improbable odds. Notably, one such poem in Rebel Heart was inspired by the experiences of Coslett's father-in-law while fighting against the forces of Francisco Franco as a volunteer in the International Brigades during the Spanish Civil War. Another poem is dedicated to the struggle of the Chechen insurgency against the Russian Federation during the Chechen Wars, in which Coslett's admiration for the rebels is made clear.

After suffering with cancer, Coslett died at Ty Bryngwyn Hospice in Llanelli, Carmarthenshire on 20 May 2004, aged 64. The funeral was held local to Coslett's home in Llangennech, and attracted a crowd of hundreds of mourners. His coffin was draped with the Welsh flag, and a guard of honour wearing black berets led the funeral cortege to a cemetery on the outskirts of Llanelli. There was a recital of the Welsh national anthem, "Hen Wlad Fy Nhadau", and flags were held above the graveside, notably the standard of Owain Glyndŵr and the "White Eagle of Snowdonia", often referred to by its Welsh name, Yr Eryr Wen (lit. 'the white eagle'), the adopted symbol of the FWA. Attendees of the funeral described Coslett as a "working class hero", and the order of service was adorned with the motto: "No saint nor king hath tomb so proud, as he whose flag becomes his shroud."
