= Welsh Republican Movement =

Welsh Republican Movement Mudiad Gweriniaethol Cymru
- Abbreviation: WRM
- Founded: 24 September 1949
- Dissolved: 1966
- Split from: Plaid Cymru
- Succeeded by: Plaid Cymru; Welsh Labour
- Newspaper: Y Gweriniaethwr
- Ideology: Welsh nationalism Welsh republicanism Left-wing nationalism Socialism
- Political position: Left-wing

Party flag

The Welsh Republican Movement (WRM; Welsh: Mudiad Gweriniaethol Cymru) was a Welsh nationalist and republican socialist political party that split from Plaid Cymru in 1949.

== History ==
=== Origins ===
In Autumn 1947, Cliff Bere, a member of the Cardiff branch of Plaid Cymru, published his pamphlet, The Welsh Republic. It attracted a nucleus of individuals within the Cardiff branch who wished to bring attention to the Republican issue. The Welsh Republican Movement originated in a motion put forward by the Cardiff branch of Plaid Cymru at the 1949 party conference in Dyffryn Ardudwy. The motion proposed changing the party's objective from a "Dominion Status within the British Commonwealth" to "an Independent Republic", but it was defeated by a margin of 9 to 1. When the motion was rejected, republican activist Eirian Davies said “Mae nhw wedi taflu’r Repwblic mas,” (They’ve thrown the Republic out).

The group held its own conference in Neath on 24-25 September 1949, where it was decided to establish the Welsh Republican Movement and to adopt a tricolour flag of red, white and green as its symbol. The movement aimed to build a base in industrial South East Wales by focusing on socialism and republicanism, in contrast to Plaid Cymru's emphasis on rural affairs, pacifism and the Welsh language.

One of the first actions undertaken by the WRM occurred on 24 November 1949, when members disrupted a speech in the House of Commons by James Griffiths, the Member of Parliament (MP) for Llanelli and then Minister of National Insurance. Joyce Ann Williams, a member of the WRM, heckled Griffiths from the Visitors' Gallery, labelling him a "Quisling" while displaying the Welsh tricolour. Williams was forcibly removed from the premises during her protest, which prompted a second WRM member, Haydn Jones, to stand up and begin heckling Griffiths, reportedly shouting: "Away with you, Jim Griffiths. Get back to Wales. We want a Welsh Socialist Republic." Jones dispersed WRM leaflets from the gallery into the chamber below before also being ejected, most of which allegedly fell among Conservative Party MPs.

=== 1950 ===
Ithel Davies stood as the WRM candidate in Ogmore at the 1950 general election, where he received 613 votes, 1.3% of the vote. During the election campaign, Plaid Cymru attempted to argue that the WRM should not use the word gweriniaeth ('republic'). An issue of the Welsh-language publication Y Cymro dated 24 March 1950 reported that some prominent members of Plaid Cymru, including a party spokesman, suggested that Ithel Davies and the WRM had no right to the term gweriniaeth, instead insisting on calling them Ripyblicanod (lit. 'Republicans').

In April following the election, a group of WRM members attended a conference of the Irish Anti-Partition Alliance, with Ithel Davies and Tom Williams giving speeches. During this conference, Sean MacBride, Ireland’s Minister for External Affairs, had a lengthy discussion with Ithel Davies, with the movement being invited to the annual conference of Clann na Poblachta (Irish for 'family of the republic'), but this invitation was never formally taken up.

At the beginning of July 1950, the WRM announced the forthcoming publication of its newspaper, Y Gweriniaethwr ('The Republican'), with Huw Davies as editor and Harri Webb as managing editor. In the first three years of its publication, the paper achieved a circulation approaching 2,000 copies.

Some members of the party were arrested for burning the Union Jack on multiple occasions. Lord Mayor of Cardiff, Alderman George Williams, condemned these flag burnings during a speech on 9 August to welcome overseas visitors at the 1950 Caerphilly National Eisteddfod. On 11 August, two WRM members snuck into Caerphilly Castle, where a Union Jack measuring 16ft by 8ft was flying over the Eisteddfod field. They lowered the flag, set it alight, and then raised it back to the top of the mast.

During a speech by Labour cabinet minister Herbert Morrison in the Plaza Cinema Hall in Swansea in October 1950, three members of the WRM heckled Morrison and scattered leaflets into the lower auditorium before being removed. The movement had targeted Morrison due to his support for rapidly increasing the population of the United Kingdom to 70 million.

At the end of a stay-down pit strike at Cilely Colliery in Tonyrefail on 14 October 1950, leaflets were handed out by members of the WRM during a pithead meeting addressed by Lodge Chairman Bryn Williams; the leaflets assured the miners of the support of the WRM.

=== 1951 ===
On 18 February 1951, four anti-war conferences were held in London, Liverpool, Glasgow and Cardiff, delegates included members of the Labour Party, Communist Party, trade union branches, religious bodies and various other organisations attended. The Cardiff conference was held at the Cory Hall, ninety delegates attended from 44 trade union branches, including 34 lodges of the National Union of Mineworkers (NUM). The chairman of the conference was Ithel Davies of the WRM, during which a seven-point resolution was passed that called on the people of all nations and states to work together towards peace. The conference also oversaw the founding of the Welsh National Peace Council, which Davies became chair of, but withdrew from the position by March.

During the late spring of 1951, WRM open-air meetings were increasingly disrupted by the police. At a meeting in Pontardawe on 25 May, Police broke into the middle of the meeting and demanded the names of the speakers. After refusing, the WRM members were told by a police inspector that they would not be allowed to hold meetings in the Swansea area. A week later, a WRM meeting near Coney Beach in Porthcawl was ordered to be disbanded by a police sergeant. On 16 June in Neath, a meeting in the town centre, a group of onlookers watched as the police arrived, an Inspector asked the speakers for their names, after the speakers gave their names they were asked to produce identity cards. After informing the inspector that they didn’t have them with them they were ordered to produce them at their local police station within 48 hours.

During this time the WRM became known for painting the slogan "Wales a Republic" across Wales, notably on the wall of the old Western Mail building on Golate Lane and the front facade of Cardiff Central Railway Station. One of the most long-lasting pieces of graffiti by the WRM was the slogan ‘Freedom for Wales’ which was painted on a wall facing the Camarthen Bridge, near the Carmarthenshire County Council offices. In June 1951, during the Festival of Britain, WRM members climbed the wall of Cardiff Castle from Bute Park using a section of rope, where they stole a number of Union Jacks which had been raised for the festival.

On 24 June 1951, Tom and Joyce Williams of the Swansea branch of the WRM addressed an open-air meeting of the Anti-Partition Association on O'Connell Street, Dublin, near the GPO. The WRM maintained links with Irish Republicans and were in contact with the London branch of Sinn Féin, and in July 1951, Seán Mac Stíofáin, future chief of staff of the Provisional IRA, paid a visit to the Cardiff headquarters of the WRM. The movement kept in correspondence with Mac Stíofáin, and during his imprisonment for the IRA raid on an arms store in Felstead School, Surrey, the WRM sent financial aid to his wife Mary.

In July 1951, Alfred Pocock, a gardener and member of the WRM, was charged in court and fined £9 for refusing to fill his census form; he stated in court that he perceived it as being designed to regiment the people of Wales “in the service of England”. The WRM held a protest near the courthouse, holding controversial placards which read “Hitler was anti-Jew; Attlee is anti-Welsh. Release Pocock.” He was later imprisoned for refusing to pay the fine. Later that month, Cliff Bere, another member of the WRM, also appeared in court for refusing to fill in his census form; he was ordered to pay a fine of £1.

=== 1952 ===
During a visit to Caernarfon in January 1952 by David Maxwell Fyfe, the Home Secretary and Minister for Welsh Affairs, slogans were painted by the WRM on walls near the statue of Lloyd George. The slogans reportedly included “Scots Quisling, stay home” and “Fight for a Welsh Republic”.

In early 1952, the WRM was involved in a campaign to prevent the execution of Andre Geoffroy, a Breton nationalist who was sentenced to death by a French military tribunal in November 1951, he was accused of handing over two British spies to the Germans in 1942. Members of the WRM founded the Andre Geoffroy Welsh Committee, which created a petition of appeal addressed to Vincent Auriol, President of the French Republic, and obtained 7,000 signatures. During a visit on 9 April by four French journalists to Cardiff to interview the mayor, the WRM painted the slogan "France - Libérez Andre Geoffroy" in large white letters on a wall bordering Bute Street. Cliff Bere was summoned to court and was fined for this graffiti, as a Police Constable had witnessed him returning to complete it. The WRM and Plaid Cymru made repeated representations to the French consul together in Cardiff in relation to the case. Geoffroy had strong support in Ireland and Scotland, and on 29 March 1952, the WRM alongside Scottish and Irish Republicans attended a meeting in Belfast hosted by the Andre Geoffroy Committee. Andre Geoffroy was pardoned in 1952 and released in 1954.

On 19 July 1952, Cliff Bere was fined £20 for failing to present himself for a medical examination and Class Z Reservist training. The movement was vocal in its opposition to this military recall during the Korean War, and Cliff Bere had previously returned one of these recall notices he had received with adhesive labels attached which read “No more blood for England” and “Z Reserve - Does dim Z yn y Gymraeg” (Z Reserve - There is no Z in the Welsh language).

On 5 October 1952, a march was held from Hyde Park to Trafalgar Square under the banner of the Celtic Alliance, among the marchers were members of Sinn Féin, the WRM, Plaid Cymru, and Scottish Nationalists. Harri Webb and Liam Callaghan of the WRM gave speeches from the plinth of Nelson's Column, alongside Oliver Brown of the Scottish National Congress, Wendy Wood of the Scottish National Party, Meredith Edwards of Plaid Cymru and E. O'Faolain of Sinn Féin.

In December 1952, the WRM sent £5 to the Kenyatta Defence Fund, a fund used to pay for the defence of Jomo Kenyatta, then president of the Kenyan African Union, who was on trial in relation to the Mau Mau rebellion. The WRM received a telegram of thanks from the general secretary of the KAU.

=== Claerwen Reservoir ===
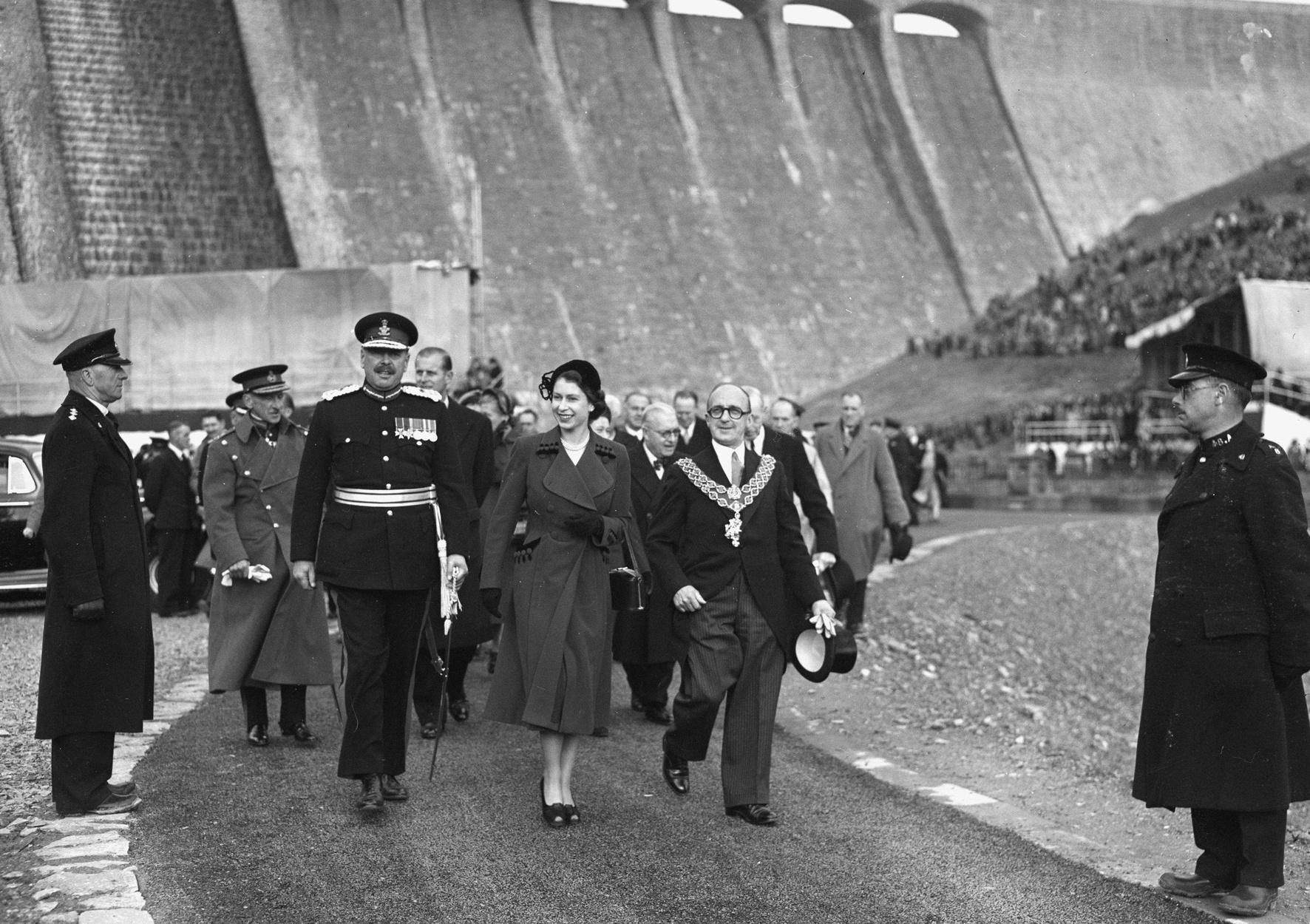
Elizabeth II attends the Claerwen Reservoir opening ceremony on 23 October 1952, shortly after a nearby WRM bombing

On 19 October 1952, the organisation became the first Welsh nationalist movement to use explosives as a form of protest. Days before the newly constructed Claerwen Reservoir in Radnorshire was due to be opened by Elizabeth II, the WRM bombed a water pipeline connecting the Elan Valley Reservoirs to Birmingham. The opening ceremony took place on 23 October and was one of Elizabeth II's first public engagements as monarch. It was reported that the bomb, which was composed of gelignite, was used to target the Fron Aqueduct, which carries water across the River Ithon approximately fifteen miles from Claerwen. Over a decade later, in February 1967, the same aqueduct was targeted in a Free Wales Army (FWA) bombing, although the bomb failed to detonate. Following the bombing, police searched the homes of several members of the WRM for explosives. On 7 February 1953, police searched the home of Beriah Gwyndaf Evans on Clodien Avenue, Cardiff, where they discovered two sticks of gelignite and fifty detonators. He subsequently pleaded guilty and was sentenced to two years' probation. Police also searched the home of WRM member Gwynfor Thomas in Nantgarw, but found no evidence linking him to the bombing. In May 1953, WRM member Pedr Lewis (Peter Rhyswil Lewis) was sentenced to 18 months' imprisonment for possession of explosives after police discovered two boxes containing detonators at his home in Bangor. The number of detonators was estimated to be as high as 200. During Lewis' trial at the Caernarfonshire Assizes, articles published in the WRM's newspaper that gave tacit support to the bombers were used as evidence. The presiding judge was accused by the WRM and other Welsh nationalists of anti-Welsh bias after reportedly dismissing two Welsh-speaking jurors and replacing them with two English-speaking jurors. On 16 May, Plaid Cymru held a rally in Bangor to protest Lewis' imprisonment. Addressing the gathering, the party's president, Gwynfor Evans, declared:

A sentence of 18 months upon this young man for having detonators in his possession is surely out of proportion to the nature of the offence, and we are calling the Home Secretary for his release.

=== 1954 ===
By 1954, the WRM was reduced to a small dedicated nucleus, which included Cliff and Eluned Bere, Harri Webb, and Huw Davies, whose main focus was producing the movement’s newspaper. Its remaining public activity consisted mainly of selling of the paper in towns across the Valleys, along with occasional street corner meetings consisting of three or four activists.

In April 1954, representatives of the WRM and Plaid Cymru travelled to Dublin to attend a commemoration of the 1916 Easter Rising. They marched with the Anti-Partition Association from the GPO to Arbour Hill, where wreaths were laid at the graves of the rising’s leaders. Following speeches numerous anti-partition public figures and activists, including P.T. O'Reilly of the Anti-Partition Association, Lord Mayor of Dublin Alfie Byrne, and Harry McHugh, Chairman of the Liverpool area Irish Anti-Partition League, Harri Webb of the WRM and Meirion Lewis of Plaid Cymru spoke at the graveside.

At the end of June 1954, Pedr Lewis was released from prison. The WRM arranged a “welcome home” celebration for him at a hotel in Swansea, where he was presented with a sum of money that had been collected by the WRM’s Assistance Fund.

=== 1955-1973 ===
By the mid-1950s, most members of the movement had either returned to Plaid Cymru or joined the Labour Party, and its newspaper ceased publication in 1957. However, F. W. S. Craig believed that it remained active as late as 1966. Harri Webb became a prominent member of Plaid Cymru and stood as the party's candidate in Pontypool at the 1970 general election where he received 2,053 votes. Other former members went on to be involved in other Welsh Republican groups, such as the Welsh Socialist Republican Movement.

In August 1973 the WRM briefly reappeared to publish a further issue of their paper, the issue declared “After over 15 years of silence Y Gweriniaethwr speaks out again in the name of Welsh Radicalism”, it went on to attack Plaid Cymru’s support of joining the EEC, dubbing it a “European capitalist club”.

== Election results ==
=== 1950 general election ===
| Constituency | Candidate | Votes | % |
|---|---|---|---|
| Ogmore | Ithel Davies | 613 | 1.3 |

== See also ==
- English republicanism
- Irish republicanism
- Scottish republicanism
- Welsh nationalism
- Republicanism in the United Kingdom
