= Julian Cayo-Evans =

Welsh political activist (1937–1995)

- Iorwerth ap Ieuan
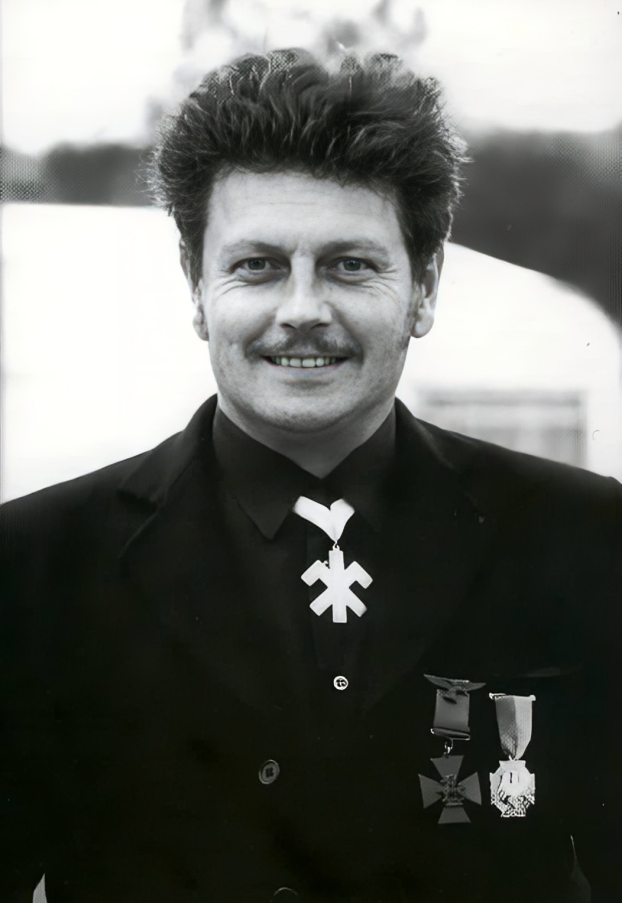
- Cayo-Evans in 1963
- Born: William Edward Julian Cayo-Evans; 22 April 1937; Lampeter, Wales
- Died: 28 March 1995 (aged 57); Silian, Ceredigion, Wales
- Burial place: Silian
- Alma mater: Royal Agricultural College
- Spouse: Gillianne Davies (m. 1966; div. 1975)
- Children: 3
- Military career
- Allegiance: Free Wales Army
- Branch: British Army
- Rank: Private
- Service number: 23164555
- Unit: South Wales Borderers
- Known for: Leader and Commandant of the Free Wales Army
- Conflicts: Malayan Emergency

William Edward Julian Cayo-Evans, also known locally as Iorwerth ap Ieuan (22 April 1937 – 28 March 1995), was a Welsh nationalist political activist and both leader and self-styled commandant of the paramilitary Free Wales Army (FWA) throughout the 1960s.

== Early life ==
Born at Plas Glandenys manor, Silian, near Lampeter, where he also died, Cayo-Evans was educated at the independent, co-educational Millfield School in the village of Street in Somerset, England. His father was John Cayo Evans, a professor of mathematics at St David's College, Lampeter and High Sheriff of Cardiganshire in the period 1941 to 1942. John was also one of the first members of Plaid Cymru. Julian had one brother. In 1955, he was conscripted for National Service, serving with the South Wales Borderers and saw active service, fighting communist guerrillas in Malaya during the bitter Malayan emergency. On his return from service, he attended the Royal Agricultural College in Cirencester.

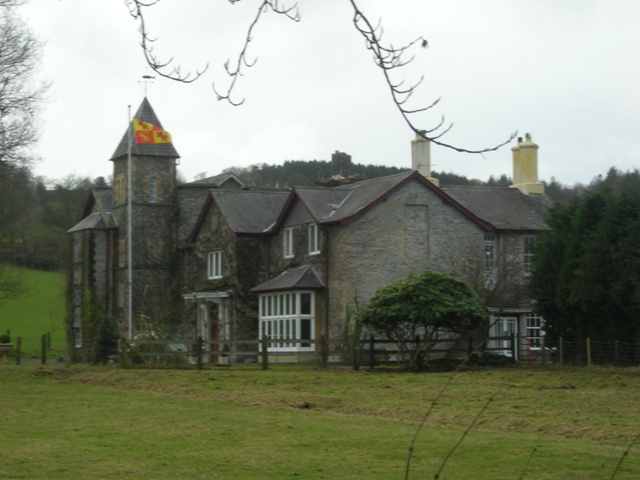
Glandenys, the family estate of Julian Cayo-Evans in Silian, photographed in 2008 with the standard of Owain Glyndŵr displayed outside the house

== Political activism ==
Best known for his leadership of the Free Wales Army, Cayo-Evans became radicalised as a result of the flooding of Tryweryn by Liverpool Corporation. His politics were right wing and anti-communist in nature, owing largely to his experience fighting against the MNLA in Malaya. Another major influence on Cayo-Evans' political outlook stemmed from his time at Millfield School, where his Polish housemaster, Yanick Helczman, left a lasting impression on him. Having fought against both Germany and the Soviet Union during the Second World War, Helczman imparted to Cayo-Evans a deep-seated anti-communism during his teenage years. Francisco Franco was reportedly one of Cayo-Evans' political idols. A British security services report from 1968, stored in the National Archives, detailed how Cayo-Evans claimed that the FWA had links with Québécois separatists, and that a member of the FWA had received weapons and explosives training.

Cayo-Evans was active in the Free Wales Army throughout the 1960s along with two other leading members of the organisation, Dennis Coslett and Gethin ap Gruffydd, and was convicted of conspiracy to cause explosions and other public order offences following a 53-day trial in 1969. The conclusion of the trial, in which Cayo-Evans was sentenced to fifteen months' imprisonment, coincided with the investiture ceremony of Charles III as Prince of Wales on 1 July 1969.

Security services' files from the UK National Archives described Cayo-Evans having "a mental age of 12", and Coslett, his second-in-command, as "unbalanced", although both of these claims are fiercely disputed by those close to the men. A memo from the Director of Public Prosecutions had cautioned against "taking the organisation's activities too seriously". When asked by the BBC for comment on the matter in 2005, historian John Davies stated that the assertion regarding Cayo-Evans' mental age "was a bit unkind"; however, "He was certainly a fantasist." Regarding the FWA itself, "the government was obviously concerned enough to investigate it thoroughly", which he surmised was connected to the sensitivity surrounding the escalating conflict in Northern Ireland at the time.

== Personal life ==
After spending a year at Cirencester Agricultural College, he returned to Lampeter to breed palomino and appaloosa horses on his stud farm. He married Gillianne Mary Davies from Llangeitho in 1966, and the couple had two sons and one daughter before divorcing in 1975. At the age of 57, Cayo-Evans died suddenly at his home in Silian as a result of heart failure on 28 March 1995. Hundreds travelled to attend his funeral at the local cemetery, including a number of plain-clothed police officers who had been informed that a firearm was going to be used for a gun salute, as was the tradition for Irish republican funerals. Instead, an accordion was played at the grave to the notes of the "Cuckoo Waltz", said to be Cayo-Evans' favourite tune.

== Print and performance ==
In April 2002, Sgript Cymru produced a play authored by Dic Edwards that was loosely based on Cayo-Evans. Franco's Bastard was performed at the Chapter Arts Centre in Cardiff and aroused both interest and protest from Welsh nationalists. Edwards later stated that "the play wasn't biographical" and apologised for any offence he may have caused Cayo-Evans' children. The writer recounted how he had personally known and become friends with Cayo-Evans following an intense physical altercation, in which he had been falsely accused of attempting to burn down a cottage at a party, resulting in him being hospitalised in Chepstow.

Wyn Thomas published a history of the Free Wales Army "Hands Off Wales" in 2013.

== In popular culture ==
In 2000, the Apollo Hotel on Cathedral Road in Cardiff was rebranded as the Cayo Arms by Tomos Watkins in reference to Julian Cayo-Evans. The decision attracted criticism from Conservative AM Jonathan Morgan, while the company defended the move. Managing director Simon Buckley characterised Cayo-Evans as “a Robin Hood character of the late 1960s”. The pub subsequently closed for refurbishment and reopened in 2018 as the Pontcanna Inn.

In 2004, Cayo-Evans was ranked 33rd in 100 Welsh Heroes, an online public opinion poll of Welsh figures later published as a book and commissioned by the Welsh Assembly–funded body Culturenet Cymru.
