= John Humphries (author) =

British writer and politician

John Humphries is a journalist, author, and politician who was formerly editor of the Western Mail.

He is the author of books on the Welsh Chartist Uprising, the rebel Caryl ap Rhys Pryce, and the violent campaign by 20th century Welsh nationalists.

== Books ==
- Humphries, John. Search for the Nile's Source The Ruined Reputation of John Petherick, Nineteenth-Century Welsh Explorer. Cardiff: University of Wales Press, 2013. According to WorldCat, the book is held in 411 libraries
- Humphries, John. Spying for Hitler The Welsh Double-Cross. Cardiff: University of Wales Press, 2012. According to WorldCat, the book is held in 632 libraries
- Humphries, John. The Man from the Alamo: Why the Welsh Chartist Uprising of 1839 Ended in a Massacre. St. Athan: Wales Books, Glyndŵr Pub, 2004.

Humphries, John. Freedom Fighters: Wales's Forgotten 'war', 1963–1993. Cardiff: University of Wales Press, 2008.
