= International relations of Wales =

Welsh Government overseas diplomacy

The objectives of the international relations of Wales are the promotion of Wales and Welsh interests abroad, the development of the Welsh economy and the positioning of Wales as a globally-responsible nation. Responsibility for Welsh international relations currently lies with the First Minister of Wales, but the responsibility can also be delegated. Relations are primarily undertaken through a network of 21 international offices operated by the Welsh Government, with representation in London, Belgium, Canada, China, Ireland, France, Germany, India, Japan, Qatar, the United Arab Emirates and in five offices across the United States. Additionally the Welsh government has signed agreements or memoranda of understanding with other countries and regions including the Basque Country and the Ōita Prefecture in Japan. This permanent representation is supplemented by overseas visits undertaken by the First Minister, and other officials, often timed to coincide with Saint David's Day, the feast day of the Welsh patron saint, and by an annual focus on a specific nation, "Wales in Germany" in 2021, "Wales in Canada" in 2022 and "Wales in France" in 2023.

Under the terms of Welsh devolution in the 20th and 21st centuries, law-making powers covering a wide range of domestic policy areas have been devolved to the Welsh government. Responsibility for other policy areas is retained by the Government of the United Kingdom. These are known as reserved matters and include the conduct of foreign policy, declarations of war and the making of international treaties. Wales, as a country and major economic unit, nevertheless conducts international relations with many other countries, parliaments, regions and supra-national bodies such as the European Union.

== International activity ==
The conduct of foreign policy is not devolved to Wales and is managed by the UK Government under the devolution settlement. Nonetheless, the Welsh government has an international strategy. Eluned Morgan, Baroness Morgan of Ely was appointed international relations minister in 2018, with responsibility for the international relations portfolio moving to the first minister of Wales, Mark Drakeford, in 2020, and remaining with the first minister under Vaughan Gething. The Senedd also has a small International Relations Team (IRT) which supports the Presiding Officers, Senedd Commissioners and Members of the Senedd in international activities.

In 1999 the Senedd approved a motion signed by the four party leaders to apply for Commonwealth Parliamentary Association (CPA) and Wales formally joined the CPA at a General Assembly meeting in Trinidad later that year.

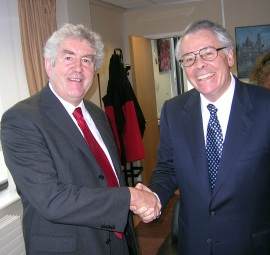
Former First Minister of Wales Rhodri Morgan with U.S. Ambassador Robert Tuttle in Cardiff (2005)

In 2022, Laura McAllister, Professor of Public Policy at the University of Cardiff, argued that increasing globalisation and the growth of Welsh exports would enable "a relatively small country such as Wales [to] now be more assertive" in the international arena.

=== International strategy ===
The International Strategy was set out in January 2020 by the then Minister for International Relations and Welsh Language. The strategy is to last 5 years and includes the following aims:

- Raising the profile of Wales internationally
- Grow the Welsh economy; assist Welsh businesses to increase exports; encourage investment in Wales; create jobs and opportunities in Wales; utilise and develop new technology
- A commitment to sustainability

=== Representation in intergovernmental organisations ===
==== Welsh Government and Senedd Cymru ====
Wales is represented in the following international intergovernmental organisations:

- British-Irish Council
- British–Irish Parliamentary Assembly
- Commonwealth Parliamentary Association
- Congress of Local and Regional Authorities - Chamber of Regions
- EU–UK Parliamentary Partnership Assembly (observer)

Within the United Kingdom, Wales is represented on the following bodies:

- Prime Minister and Heads of Devolved Governments Council
- Council of the Nations and Regions
- Inter-Parliamentary Forum

==== Local authorities ====
Cardiff is an associate member of Eurocities. Welsh local authorities nominate one delegate to the Chamber of Local Authorities of the Congress of Local and Regional Authorities.

=== St David's Day international visits ===
The first minister has routinely embarked on diplomatic visits to other countries on Saint David's Day (1 March). During his tenure, Carwyn Jones, made visits to Brussels, Washington D.C., New York, Barcelona and Montreal, between 2011 and 2018. His successor, Mark Drakeford has used the day for sole visits to Brussels, (and Paris in 2019), marking an emphasis on European diplomatic visits since he became first minister.

=== Taith ===
Wales started its Taith student exchange programme in September 2022 to replace the Erasmus scheme. The scheme aims over four years for 15,000 students and staff from Wales to travel abroad and for 10,000 to work or study in Wales.

=== 2026 Cardiff memorandum of understanding ===
On 14 September 2026, Rhun ap Iorwerth, John Swinney and Michelle O'Neill, in their capacity as party leaders rather than heads of government, together with Sinn Féin president Mary Lou McDonald, signed a memorandum of understanding in Cardiff to affirm their shared commitment to independence from the United Kingdom and set out planned Welsh-Scottish cooperation on issues including child poverty, the cost of living, and international engagement, along with joint ambitions on the economy, energy and international partnerships.

== Sport ==
Wales uses rugby and rugby events to promote itself overseas.

The Welsh Government used Wales' participation in the 2022 FIFA World Cup to promote Welsh culture, and established a Football Museum for Wales.

Wales is represented by its own team at the Commonwealth Games and Commonwealth Youth Games.

=== Membership ===
Wales holds independent membership of the following international sports federations:

- Badminton World Federation
- Commonwealth Games Federation
- FIFA (UEFA)
- International Chess Federation (European Chess Union)
- International Esports Federation
- International Golf Federation
- International Hockey Federation
- International Korfball Federation
- International Rugby League
- International Table Tennis Federation
- World Boxing
- World Darts Federation
- World Lacrosse
- World Rugby (Rugby Europe)
- World Squash (European Squash Federation)

== International relations ==
=== Europe ===
The Welsh government has an international office in Brussels which focuses mainly on European Union matters and 5 other offices across Europe. Mark Drakeford has placed a greater emphasis on European diplomatic visits with visits to Brussels in 2019, 2020, 2022 and 2023 on St David's Day.

In March 2022, the first minister encouraged the CoR-UK Contact Group to ensure closer ties between sub-sovereign governments as a means of ensuring connections between the UK and the EU.

On 21 March 2023, EU Ambassador Pedro Serrano made his first visit to Wales. He visited Cardiff jointly with the ambassadors of Slovenia, Slovakia and the High Commissioner of Cyprus.

==== Germany ====
Germany has been a significant export location for Wales over a prolonged period. As of 2018, Welsh exports of goods were worth £3.3bn a year. In 2021, Germany was the top export destination for Wales.

As of 2018, almost 90 German companies were identified in Wales. A 2016 study showed that 12% of overseas visitors to Wales came from Germany, behind only Australia at 13% and the USA at 15%.

In 2018, with the UK's exit from the European Union imminent, the Welsh government opened an office in Berlin and another in Düsseldorf.

First Minister of Wales, Mark Drakeford announced a year of activity between Wales and Germany, touted as "Wales in Germany 2021". Activity began with a virtual meeting between the first minister and the German ambassador to the UK, Herr Andreas Michaelis on 11 January 2021.

==== France ====
Approximately 80 French businesses are based in Wales which employ around 10,000 people. Welsh exports to France totaled a worth of £1.8bn in 2020 and France is the second largest export destination for Wales after Germany.

The first minister of Wales, Mark Drakeford visited Paris on 16–18 March 2023 to launch the year of Wales in France.

During a visit to France in March 2023, a Welsh delegation led by First Minister Mark Drakeford met with officials from Brittany to mark ties .

==== Basque Country (Spain) ====
The Basque Country is a priority partner region in Welsh Government's International Strategy and in July 2018, a memorandum of understanding was signed. The First minister of Wales, Mark Drakeford visited the Basque Country in March 2023.

==== Flanders (Belgium) ====
The Government of Flanders and the Flemish Parliament are in regular contact with the Welsh Government and Senedd with collaboration mainly centered around health, culture, tourism and international relations.

=== North America ===
==== United States ====
Members of the United States Congress have established the Friends of Wales Caucus, promoting cultural and economic ties between the United States and Wales.

==== Canada ====
The Welsh Government designated 2022 as the year of "Wales in Canada" which aimed to promote Wales in Canada.

Quebec

The Welsh Government and the Government of Quebec set up a funding scheme aimed to support organisations in both Wales and Quebec, in Canada, to promote co-operation. Particular emphasis was given to green recovery, economy, science, innovation, art and culture will be prioritised. Discussions on a Wales–Quebec began after the Welsh office in Montreal was opened in 2018. The included increased partnership between Wales and Quebec in the following:

1. Trade & supply chains
2. Research & Innovation
3. Arts & Culture
4. Language policy
5. Sharing knowledge and expertise

The Welsh Minister for International Relations and Welsh Language signed the Declaration of Intent in Montreal during her Canada visit in 2020.

=== Asia ===
==== Qatar ====
In September 2022, Welsh Government rejects some calls to close the Welsh Qatar office due to concerns about human rights. The Welsh Government said that it hoped to engage with countries with differing human rights to Wales, to influence change there.

==== Japan ====
In 1972 Takiron became the first Japanese company to make a significant investment in Wales. As of 2022, over 60 Japanese companies had a presence in Wales. Wales exports a variety of agricultural products to Japan, and cultural ties have been developed through rugby.

Through the Welsh Government's International Strategy, the Welsh government signed a Memorandum of Understanding (MoU) with the Oita Prefectural Government of Japan, to strengthen relationships including economic exchange, arts and culture, sport, academia, tourism, and food and drink.

=== Africa ===
The Wales and Africa programme operated by the Welsh government aims to support people in Wales to help tackle poverty in Africa.

The International Learning Opportunities programme (ILO) is a programme for experienced leaders and managers in Wales to spend 8 weeks in Lesotho, Namibia, Somaliland (Somalia) or Uganda.

The Wales and Africa grants scheme is a grant scheme for community groups and organisations in Wales that work in Sub Saharan Africa.

Hub Cymru Africa is an organisation that aims to support Wales and Africa Health Links Network, the Sub-Saharan Advisory Panel and Fair Trade Wales. It is based at the Welsh Centre for International Affairs.

The Size of Wales is an organisation which aims to sustain an area of African tropical forest of a similar size to Wales. The organisation is supported by the Countryside Council for Wales (CCW) and the Welsh government.

== Missions ==
=== Welsh international offices ===
The Welsh Government's international policy since 2020, "Wales, Europe and the world" includes country relationships with Germany, France, Ireland, the United States and Canada; and regional relationships with the Basque Country in Spain, Brittany in France and Flanders in Belgium. The Welsh Government has 21 international offices in 12 countries which include offices in London, Belgium, Canada, China, Ireland, France, Germany, India, Japan, Qatar, United Arab Emirates and five offices across the United States.

Wales has international offices in the following locations:

- Brussels – Belgium
- Montreal – Canada
- Beijing, Chongqing, Shanghai – China
- (Republic of Ireland) Dublin – Ireland
- Paris – France
- Berlin, Düsseldorf – Germany
- Bengaluru, Delhi, Mumbai – India
- Tokyo – Japan
- Doha – Qatar
- Dubai – United Arab Emirates
- London – United Kingdom
- Atlanta, Chicago, New York, Los Angeles, Washington, D.C. – United States

=== Consular missions in Wales ===
Wales hosts the following consular missions:

Cardiff

- Denmark
- Ireland
- Italy
- Switzerland

== Welsh Centre for International Affairs ==
The Council for Education in World Citizenship (CEWC) was an organisation which aimed to educate young people on international problems from the 1940s onwards. The Welsh organisation (CEWC-Cymru) worked with the United Nations Association Wales and from 1973, worked with the Welsh Centre for International Affairs. The organisation was based at the Temple of Peace. In 2014, the three organisations merged into the Welsh Centre for International Affairs.

== See also ==
- Foreign relations of the United Kingdom
- Intergovernmental relations in the United Kingdom
- Membership of the countries of the United Kingdom in international organisations
- List of twin towns and sister cities in Wales
- International relations of England
- International relations of Northern Ireland
- International relations of Scotland
