= Friends of Wales Caucus =

Welsh-American congressional caucus and cultural forum

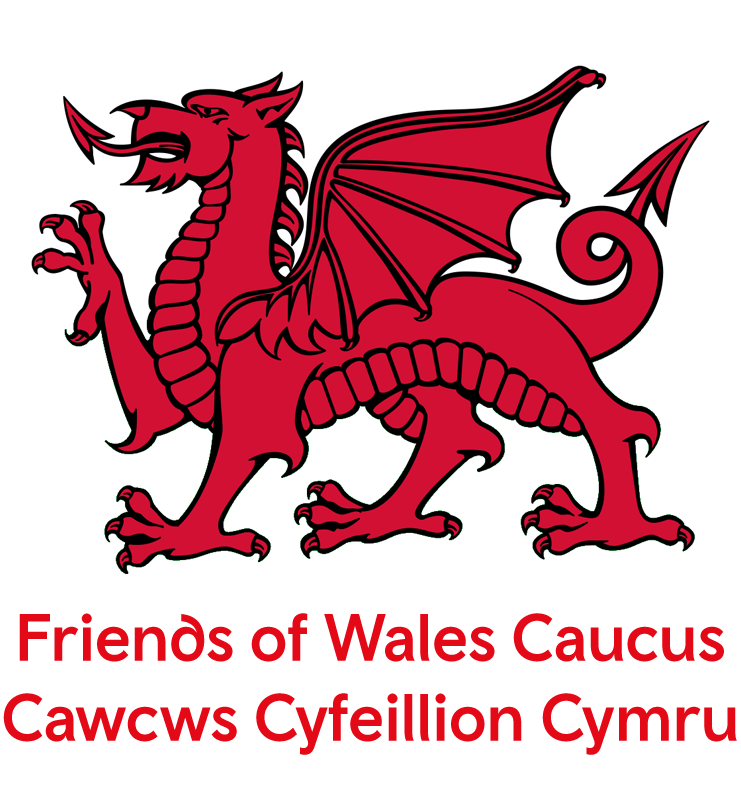
- Co-chairs: Morgan Griffith (VA-9; R); Lloyd Doggett (TX-37; D)
- Founded: 2014; 12 years ago
- Colors: Red
- Seats in the House: 7 / 435
- Seats in the Senate: 2 / 100

The Friends of Wales Caucus is a congressional caucus consisting of Welsh and Welsh heritage congresspeople in the United States Government, Senate and House of Representatives. It is chaired by representatives Morgan Griffith of the Republican Party and Lloyd Doggett of the Democratic Party.

The group was founded by Rep. Morgan Griffith of Virginia and joined by lawmakers who wanted to "build direct relations with Wales" in light of the 250 American-owned companies based in Wales, and the close Welsh heritage in regions of the US such as in Utah, Idaho, Vermont, Oregon, Wyoming, as well as shared industrial heritage between Wales and Pennsylvania and Ohio. It was established in partnership with the Welsh Government.

== History ==
The group was established in 2014 by Virginia Representative Morgan Griffith. He reportedly instigated the concept when he was invited to join the Friends of Scotland Caucus, and enquired "What about the Welsh?" Griffith appropriately represents a coal community, many of which in the United States were historically populated by emigrating Welsh miners who sought work across the Atlantic.

In his statement, he said he was both "proud of my own Welsh heritage, as well as the connections between my district in Southwest Virginia and Wales."

In recent years the group have worked with the Global Welsh international diaspora group, which serves as the grassroots diaspora organisation for Welsh heritage people worldwide, and who have significant branches in Chicago, Virginia, and New York City, acting as a business networking community as well as a cultural exchange.

In 2014 Welsh First Minister Carwyn Jones completed an official five day visit on St. David's Day to Washington, D.C. and New York, meeting with the Caucus, holding a British Council-sponsored opening of a Dylan Thomas event in Greenwich Village, and taking part in engagements at the New York Stock Exchange.

Jones again undertook official engagements in Washington DC, Philadelphia and New York on St David's Day, again meeting with the Caucus for the occasion.

In 2015 the group sent a group of five Congresspeople to Swansea University's new Bay Campus for the first ever US Congressional delegation to Wales. The visitors included Morgan Griffith (R-VA), Kenny Marchant (R-TX), Dan Kildee (D-MI) and Matt Cartwright (D-PA). The visit focussed on establishing higher education links such as the link between Swansea University's College of Engineering and the Virginia Tech College of Engineering, as well as the university's American Studies course.

In 2025 congressman Lloyd Doggett became the Democratic co-chair of the caucus, serving alongside the existing Republican chair Morgan Griffith.

== Aims ==
The organization says it will hold regular social and educational events to inform Members of Congress about Welsh culture, heritage, as well as trade, tourism, investment, and economic opportunities. Businesses particularly engaged with the group's events typically include those in the aerospace, cybersecurity, engineering and automotive sectors.

== Annual events ==
It holds an annual celebration for Saint David's Day, a yearly cultural event in Wales celebrating the Patron of Wales Saint David. The event is attended by the British Ambassador (for its 2014 inauguration this was Ambassador Peter Westmacott) and hosts U.S. lawmakers, representatives of the British and Welsh governments, and business leaders. It has also been recently attended by recent Welsh First Ministers, Carwyn Jones and Mark Drakeford. The event draws on Welsh cultural staples such as fish and chips, Welsh whisky, and traditional Welsh music including choirs and harpists. Similar engagements are held by the College of William & Mary, who have a Williamsburg chapter of the Friends of Wales and whose Swem Library features an extensive collection of Welsh poetry established in 1969.

== Membership ==
Membership is not limited to those of Welsh heritage, and includes those in Congress interested in the country more broadly. The organisation is supported by the Welsh Government trade mission in Washington and North America broadly, as well as the British Embassy Washington.

House
Representative	Party	State
Morgan Griffith (chair)	Republican	Virginia
Steve Cohen	Democratic	Tennessee
Ron Kind	Democratic	Wisconsin
Doug Lamborn	Republican	Colorado
Ted Lieu	Democratic	California
Jamie Raskin	Democratic	Maryland
Roger Williams	Republican	Texas
Senate
Senator	Party	State
John Boozman	Republican	Arkansas
Joe Manchin	Independent	West Virginia
Executive
Secretary	Party	Office
None	n/a	n/a

== See also ==
- Foreign relations of Wales
- List of Welsh Americans
- Welsh Americans
- Welsh Tract
- Welsh settlement in the Americas
- Wales and the United States
- Welsh Centre for International Affairs
- Politics of Wales
- Americans in the United Kingdom
- Friends of Ireland
