= Gwilym Davies =

Gwilym Davies may refer to:

- Gwilym Ednyfed Hudson Davies (1929–2018), Welsh Labour Party then SDP politician, Member of Parliament for Conway 1966–1970, Caerphilly 1979–1983
- Gwilym Elfed Davies, Baron Davies of Penrhys (1913–1992), Welsh Labour politician, Member of Parliament for Rhondda East 1959–1974
- Gwilym Davies (minister) (1879–1955), Welsh Baptist minister
- Gwilym Davies (barista) (born 1967), Winner of the 2009 World Barista Championship
