= Temple of Peace bombing =

1967 bombing in Cardiff, Wales

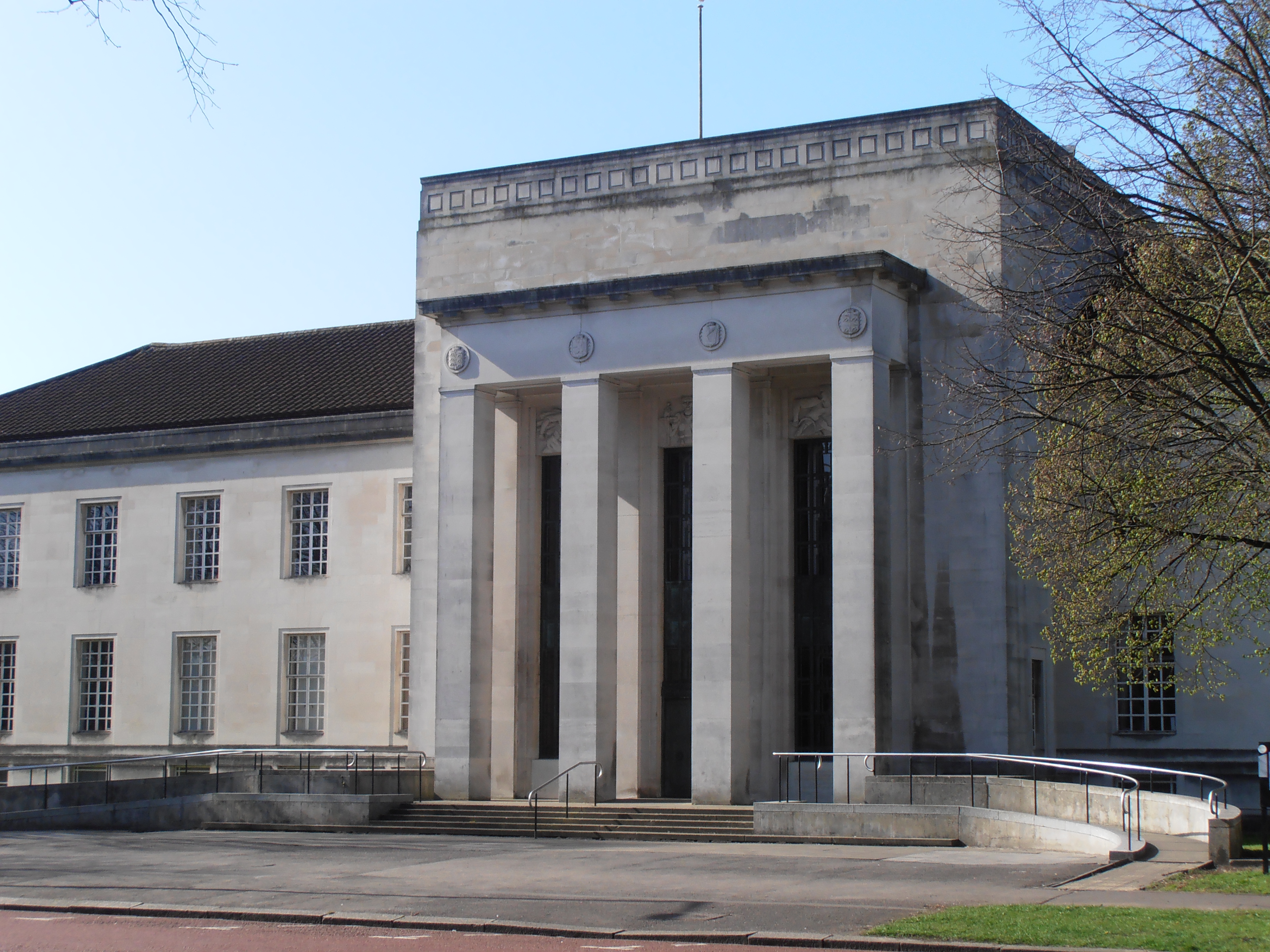
- Temple of Peace in 2012
- Location: 51.48733°N 3.18329°W; Cathays Park, Cardiff, Wales
- Date: 17 November 1967; 4:00 (UTC+01:00)
- Attack type: Improvised explosive device
- Perpetrator: Mudiad Amddiffyn Cymru
- Motive: Anti-investiture sentiment Welsh nationalism

The Temple of Peace bombing occurred on the morning of 17 November 1967 at 4:00 a.m. in the Temple of Peace and Health in Cathays Park, Cardiff. The bomb caused extensive damage to the reception area and façade. There were no fatalities or injuries.

== Bombing ==
One year before the Prince Charles investiture a bomb went off in the Temple of Peace, Cardiff. The bomb was the day before an investiture preparation committee meeting. It was believed that the bomb had been planted on the lintel of the building. The building was bombed on 17 November 1967 at 4am.

The bomb caused "extensive damage" to the reception area and façade, destroying many items that had been displayed since the opening 20 years earlier. The bomb exploded just 6 days before the Temple's anniversary. Shrapnel smashed office windows right across the park.

The Temple of Peace and Health was chosen as a target due to civil servants using the building as a base to plan the approaching investiture of Prince Charles as Prince of Wales.

Several artifacts that were on display at the time were destroyed by the blast which was heard from over a mile away.

The bomb did not damage the conference room.

== Aftermath ==
The planned meeting went ahead with tightened security and road blocks set up by police throughout Cardiff. Around 450 civic leaders turned up to the event, including the Earl of Snowdon. Police reported their investigation into the bombing was being hampered by the Welsh students, who refused to speak to the police using any language other than Welsh.

The leader of MAC, John Barnard Jenkins, said the group never tried to hurt anyone with their bombing campaign, they intended to just disrupt the investiture.

The attack sparked outrage among many, not least the symbolism of having bombed the very building that symbolised the Welsh nation's commitment to WW1, containing the papers from the public appeal to restore the damaged building over the months that followed.

== Sources ==
- Humphries, John (20 November 2008). Freedom Fighters: Wales's Forgotten 'War' 1963–1993. University of Wales Press. ISBN 978-0-7083-2177-5.
- Thomas, Wyn (23 March 2022). Hands Off Wales: Nationhood and Militancy (Paperback ed.). Y Lolfa. ISBN 978-1-80099-229-0.
