= List of diplomatic missions in Wales =

This page lists diplomatic missions located in Wales, a constituent country within the United Kingdom.

== Consulates and Consulates General ==
Wales hosts the following consular missions:

Cardiff

- Denmark
- Ireland
- Italy
- Switzerland

== Honorary consulates ==
All in Cardiff unless otherwise noted:

- Finland (Newport)
- Germany
- Hungary
- Iceland
- Sweden

== See also ==
- International relations of Wales
- Foreign relations of the United Kingdom
- List of diplomatic missions in the United Kingdom
- List of diplomatic missions of the United Kingdom
