= John Barnard Jenkins =

Welsh nationalist and soldier (1933–2020)

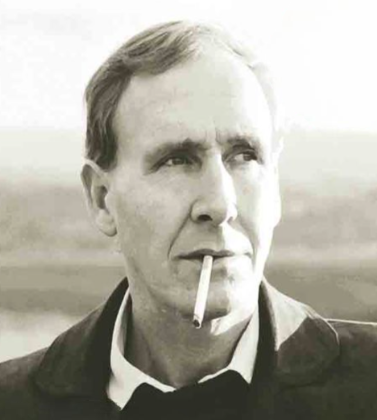
- Born: John Barnard; 11 March 1933; Cardiff, Wales
- Died: 17 December 2020 (aged 87); Wrexham, Wales
- Alma mater: University College of South Wales
- Spouse: Thelma Bridgeman (m. 1958; div. 1972)
- Children: 2
- Military career
- Allegiance: Mudiad Amddiffyn Cymru
- Branch: British Army
- Service years: 1950–1955; 1958–1969
- Rank: Sergeant
- Unit: Royal Army Dental Corps
- Known for: Leader of Mudiad Amddiffyn Cymru
- Conflicts: Cyprus Emergency

John Barnard Jenkins (11 March 1933 – 17 December 2020) was a Welsh nationalist, British Army soldier, and leader of the Welsh nationalist group Mudiad Amddiffyn Cymru from 1964 until his arrest in 1969. During his tenure, the MAC embarked on a campaign of Welsh resistance against the British government, and bombed numerous sites in and around Wales. In 1970, Jenkins was convicted for his involvement in these activities, and sentenced to several concurrent 10-year terms of confinement, of which he served seven years.

Jenkins was born in Cardiff and grew up in the village of Penybryn, near Gelligaer. He attended Bargoed Grammar School but left at 13 to take up a job as a blacksmith's apprentice. He enlisted in the British Army in 1950 becoming a non-commissioned officer in the Royal Army Dental Corps, and serving in Germany, Cyprus and Austria. In 1964, Jenkins became a member of Mudiad Amddiffyn Cymru, a Welsh nationalist movement, effectively becoming the leader of the organisation after a short period. He was influenced by major events in Wales during the time, such as the Tryweryn Bill and the Aberfan disaster, which he believed were the result of the subjugation of the nation. After spending two years reshaping the logistics and security of the group, the organisation began a bombing campaign against targets they identified as detrimental to the interests of Wales.

The first bombing targeted a water pipeline at Llanrhaeadr-ym-Mochnant and the campaign continued with attacks on numerous targets for several years, including tax offices, monuments and an English-owned business. The attacks culminated in four bombs being planted to disrupt the investiture of Prince Charles at Caernarfon Castle in 1969. The first device exploded prematurely, killing two MAC members, while two failed to detonate. One of these laid undiscovered for several days before seriously injuring a 10-year old boy who discovered the device. The last exploded in the garden of a police Chief Constable. Later that year, Jenkins was arrested and charged with theft and explosive offences in relation to the bombings and was sentenced to ten years in prison.

Released in 1976, he studied to become a social worker and was employed in the profession for the majority of his later life. He spent a further two years in jail after admitting that he provided the address of a safe house to a wanted fugitive in the early 1980s.

== Early life ==
Jenkins was born John Barnard on 11 March 1933 in Cardiff to Minerva Barnard. His official birth certificate records his place of birth as Northland, a Salvation Army home for young pregnant women with little support. However, Jenkins believed it more likely he was born at nearby St David's Hospital before being relocated to Northlands. Jenkins' father was unknown to him and was not listed on his birth certificate; he declined to ever ask his mother despite finding documents in the family home that suggested his father had paid child support for most of his adolescence. After being discharged from Northland, his mother chose not to return to her mother's home in Aberfan and instead moved in with her sister in Pontypool. While Jenkins was still an infant, his mother met Thomas Jenkins and moved into his family home in Llanfabon before marrying in November 1934. The pair moved into their own home in Treharris soon after and had a son together, Keith.

Jenkins later recalled that his mother and stepfather Tom provided him with "an idyllic childhood". His mother had previously worked as a domestic servant in the employment of a local family and later at an inn near Quakers Yard. His stepfather worked as a labourer at the local colliery to provide for the family. Jenkins regarded Tom as "my father" and remarked that Tom "never treated me as anything other than the son he loved". Tom legally adopted Jenkins at the age of 10, bringing an end to the financial support offered by his birth father. Jenkins stated that he never wished to know the identity of his father, joking "he might be English!"

He attended a local primary school across the road from the family home in Treharris until they relocated to Penybryn, in the Rhymney Valley, when he was between seven and eight during the Second World War. Their new home had several more modern amenities, including its own back garden and an indoor toilet. As most of the men in the area were excused being called-up for service due to the importance of the coal-mining industry and the family grew and made most of their own food, the effects of the war made little impact on Jenkins' daily life. Following the family's move to Penybryn, he attended Glyn-gaer Primary School in Gelligaer instead. He scored highly in his eleven-plus exams in 1944, one of only two pupils from his school to pass, and was offered a place at Bargoed Grammar School.

== Burgeoning nationalism ==
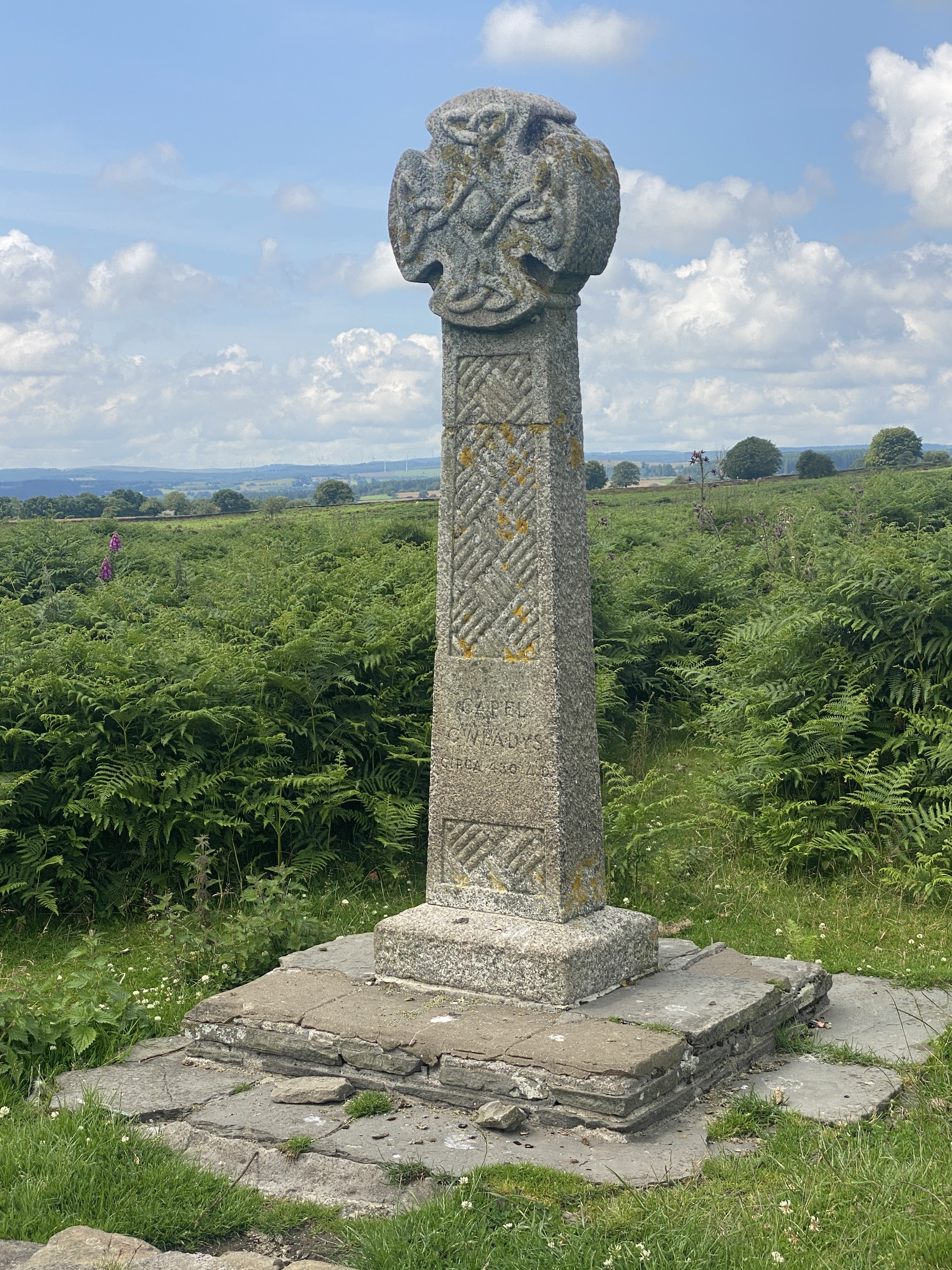
Jenkins credited his discovery of Capel Gwladys as being a pivotal moment in his turn towards Welsh nationalism

Upon his arrival at his new school, Jenkins quickly grew disillusioned with what the school was teaching. He noted "On arrival ... I expected to learn about Welsh history. But it wasn't taught. We were taught about King Alfred and the blackened cakes and Bruce and the spider ... but we weren't taught about the things that really mattered to us, such as where we lived and how we got to where we were." He became increasingly interested in Welsh history, often exploring churches and ruins in his free time to learn more. One particular discovery shaped his mindset during this period; in school he was taught that Christianity had been introduced to Britain by Augustine in 597 AD, but soon discovered an inscription dedicated to Saint Gwladys near Gelligaer that pre-dated this. This led him to discern that "the policy was to rubbish the older Celtic Church and replace it with an English-centric one." Jenkins would draw the conclusion that the Venerable Bede, one of the most noted historians of the period, had "simply ignored the facts. And why? For reasons of political power. To promote the idea that the barbarous British natives had been tamed by the Anglo-Saxon."

Jenkins began considering himself a loner at school, often finding himself uninterested in the same pastimes that his classmates followed, such as football. In later life, he reflected that he may have experienced the beginning of "what I now believe were homosexual tendencies" and had a brief encounter with a fellow pupil but rejected his advances. Jenkins struggled at the school; the only subject in which he performed well was English literature and, at 13, he decided to leave Bargoed Grammar School. He secured an apprenticeship with a local blacksmith in Bargoed, replacing the gates and fences on local farms that had been stripped for materials during the war effort. He also joined the local junior marching band where he played the drum. In his spare time, Jenkins became engrossed in reading books on Welsh history, forming the conclusion that the nation had been "downtrodden". He worked at the blacksmith's for more than two years before taking a better paid position at Lysaght steelworks in Newport. However, the increased travel time meant that Jenkins had to catch a bus by 4:30 am and would often not return home until 7:30 pm.

== Army service and marriage ==
Dissatisfied with his work environment and having split from a girl he later described as his "true love", Jenkins decided to enlist in the British Army. He visited the Army recruitment office in Cardiff and sat an entrance exam on 30 November 1950, with his results seeing him assigned to the Royal Army Dental Corps. He completed basic training at Aldershot Garrison before receiving his first posting in Warminster. He was soon positioned for a move overseas, shortly before his 21st birthday, initially being assigned to Egypt before swapping his posting with a fellow recruit who had been selected to go to Austria. He was posted to Berlin soon after arrival and was stationed in the British Army garrison set up in the Olympiastadion. He was promoted to sergeant during his time in Germany and was earning enough money to help support his family in Wales, including sending food parcels home.

Jenkins returned to Aldershot in 1955 and, having served the mandatory five years of service, requested a voluntary discharge from the army. He was demobbed on 29 November the same year. His decision to leave the army had been prompted by the offer of a well-paid job at a local factory near his home in Penybryn, however the site closed soon after due to an economic downturn. Jenkins consternation at the closure would lead him to declare that "Wales is the first to suffer" during any economic upheaval. He instead briefly took a job at a steelworks in Cardiff before deciding to emigrate to South Africa to work in the country's gold mines. In order to do so, Jenkins was required to have at least one year's experience of mining, so began working at Penallta Colliery. He remained there for several months until suffering a minor accident while riding his motorcycle. Jenkins then went on to work as a student nurse at East Glamorgan Hospital. While working there, he met Thelma Bridgeman and, after 18 months, the pair married at St Matthias' Church in Treharris in October 1958.

== Territorial Army and second enlisting ==
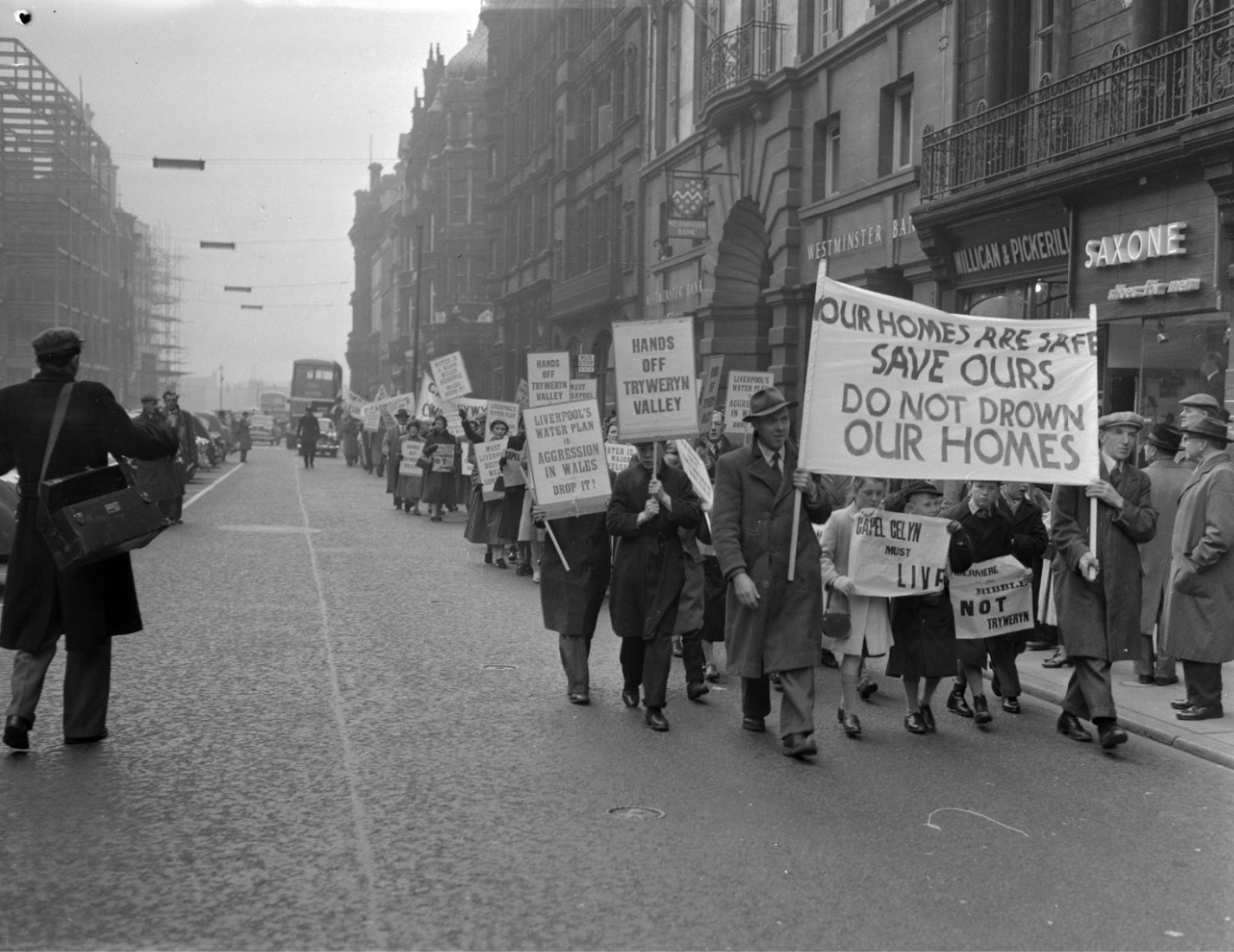
A protest held in Liverpool opposing the planned flooding of Tryweryn

Jenkins chose to enlist in the Territorial Army around the same time that the Tryweryn Bill was passed through Parliament. The bill, put forward by the Liverpool Corporation, proposed flooding the Tryweryn Valley and the community of Capel Celyn to create a reservoir in order to increase the water supply for the North-West of England. This was met with opposition from Wales; no Welsh Members of Parliament (MPs) voted in favour of the Bill and street protests were held in Liverpool. Despite this, the bill passed. The decision increased support for Welsh nationalism and is credited with a rise in support for Plaid Cymru, which won its first seat in the first election held after the construction of the reservoir.

Jenkins chose to re-enlist in the British Army in July 1958 after finding the quality of life provided by his work in civilian life lower than when in service. He rejoined the Dental Corps as a non-commissioned officer and being posted to Cyprus. Although he and his family lived in Famagusta, his job was located in the Dhekelia Cantonment, around 20 miles (32 km) from his home. With no personal transport, Jenkins took the bus each day and struck up friendships with locals, receiving at least one reprimand from his superiors for socialising with locals at his home. He also witnessed firsthand the successful incursions of the EOKA, a guerilla outfit that opposed British rule. Jenkins' first child was born in 1959 during his posting, but as British rule drew to an end in Cyprus, the scale of the military presence in the country was greatly reduced. Jenkins was instead posted to Germany for a second time, being stationed in Bielefeld.

== Mudiad Amddiffyn Cymru ==
=== Leadership, recruitment and training ===
One of the first actions against the state that Jenkins participated in was a land-buying scheme intended to disrupt the planned creation of the Clywedog Reservoir, which required the flooding of Clywedog Valley. The Clywedog subcommittee purchased 2.6 acres (1.1 ha) of land at the centre of the valley and sublet parts to contributors, including Jenkins. The plan was overruled by Parliament in a decision derided by Jenkins. He stated "they simply changed the law ... this was the final thing which convinced me that constitutionally speaking, you can't win against people who own all judicial eventualities." His second child was born shortly afterwards and the family chose to return to South Wales to provide the children with an education at a Welsh-medium school. Jenkins remained on deployment in Germany for nearly a year away from his family.

In October 1964, during a spell in Wales on leave from the army, Jenkins met Phil Williams and David Walters, a member of Mudiad Amddiffyn Cymru (MAC, Movement for the Defence of Wales) who had previously been convicted over an attempt to sabotage the electricity supply at Llyn Celyn, while the pair were canvassing support for Williams in a Caerphilly by-election. Walters organised a meeting with Jenkins, along with his accomplice in the Llyn Celyn incident David Pritchard. Jenkins later recalled that the meeting was "disguised as a chat, but it was really an interview ... It was quite intense." A few days after the meeting, Pritchard contacted Jenkins with an offer, not only to join MAC, but to become the leader of the group. He immediately set about planning ways of displaying the opposition of the Welsh people to the Tryweryn Bill and subsequent similar propositions. Jenkins maintained that his initial plans "still hoped that a campaign of direct action would not be necessary and that those in Whitehall would start showing more respect for Wales."

His feelings of anti-Welsh sentiment in the Army also began to grow when he sent a letter to the British Forces Broadcasting Service in Germany requesting more Welsh-based programming. In the reply to his letter, Jenkins was told that the "British Army did not pander to tribalism". Jenkins issued a request to be posted back to Britain, seeking a position at Saighton Camp in Cheshire. His request was granted and his new posting provided him with the opportunity to be able to travel freely to and from Wales, which according to Jenkins was "crucial" to his new role with the MAC.

Jenkins clashed with Walters and Pritchard early on after discovering that the MAC had previously looked to obtain arms from Libya and other similar nations which had hoped to cause disruption in Britain. The organisation had not followed through with the acquisition, largely due to the poor quality of weapons being offered, but the idea put Jenkins at odds with the others. He feared that arming the MAC would see them considered in the same vein as the Irish Republican Army, commenting "Shooting people ... was all very well, but it would not have earned the hearts and minds that I thought a campaign of militant activity should be all about." Walters and Pritchard were largely excluded from Jenkins' plans soon afterwards, as he believed they were too well known after their previous arrests, and his work became focused in North Wales. Pritchard provided the basic explosives training to Jenkins that would be used in the group's activities moving forward.

Although Pritchard and members of the MAC carried out a bombing at Clywedog Reservoir in 1966, Jenkins had no involvement in the plan, with the organisation having strict contact rules between members. He instead spent two years largely assessing the logistical capability of the group's network, ascertaining the supply of explosives and its membership numbers. Jenkins initial plan was simply to strengthen the organisation where he could before stepping aside for someone else to lead. He set about aiming to recruit new members to the group that would be unknown to the police. These prospective members were watched by MAC operatives for months at a time to determine their reliability, before being approached innocuously by Jenkins over a period of weeks in a social setting where he would conduct a covert interview, gauging the reaction of the person. He slowly implemented a cell structure throughout Wales, with only Jenkins knowing the identity of each cell's leader and providing basic explosives training to each one. These training sessions usually took place in secluded woodlands or even pub car parks and would involve Jenkins showing the recruit the basic assembly methods. Such was the success of the cell structure that it has been reported that the IRA later adopted the system to great effect during The Troubles.

=== Aberfan disaster and first MAC actions ===
In October 1966, Jenkins returned to Penybryn on a normal visit to his parents' home. He drove back to Chester on 20 October, briefly driving through his grandmother's hometown of Aberfan before returning home. The following morning, Jenkins watched TV news broadcasts of the Aberfan disaster that had occurred earlier that morning. A spoil tip situated above the town had collapsed, sending a cascade of slurry towards Aberfan. It engulfed a local primary school and killed 144 people, most of whom were children at the school. Jenkins was infuriated by the response of the National Coal Board and other dignitaries. In a 1969 police interview, he stated "I felt that Aberfan was the ultimate expression of English disinterest in Wales." The Aberfan disaster, coming so closely after the perceived injustices of the Tryweryn Bill and the construction of the Clywedog Reservoir, prompted an acceleration in the MAC's operations and Jenkins subsequently cancelled his membership of Plaid Cymru, believing that their response to these events was unsatisfactory. He later noted "I think Aberfan was the turning point."

In February 1966 members of the Free Wales Army (FWA), also founded in the recent upheaval, approached the MAC to build an explosive device to be used in targeting the Elan Valley water pipeline that supplied Birmingham. However, the FWA were unaware of the makers of the device. The FWA laid the bomb, containing 40 sticks of gelignite, but failed to connect the primers properly during assembly and the device failed to detonate. From this point on, Jenkins decided that he would have final say over all actions undertaken to ensure the success and secrecy of all operations. He returned to Cyprus in 1967, on a three-week cover deployment with the Gloucestershire Regiment. During this period, the announcement of the Investiture of Prince Charles was made, scheduled to take place two years later at Caernarfon Castle, prompted Jenkins' decision that the MAC were ready to make their first moves in selecting targets and carrying out operations.

The political objective of a particular target needed to be clear to everyone. You want to avoid ambiguity. I mean, when you blow up a water pipeline carrying water to Liverpool, the message is loud and clear. People across Wales would know exactly what you're doing and why.

— Jenkins on the selection of the MAC's first target at Llanrhaeadr-ym-Mochnant.

The first target selected was a water pipeline in Llanrhaeadr-ym-Mochnant that transported water 70 miles from a reservoir near the River Vyrnwy to Liverpool. Jenkins had studied the site extensively under the guise of sightseeing trips to the nearby Pistyll Rhaeadr. He met Pritchard in Rhayader several days before the planned action, where Pritchard supplied him with 14.5 pounds (6.6 kg) of nitroglycerin and around 500 detonators. Jenkins and another MAC member, Ernie Alders, travelled from Wrexham to the site on 30 September 1967 and set up the device with only a small pencil torch for light. The bomb was successfully detonated at 2 a.m. using a timer, rupturing the water pipeline and causing an estimated £10,000 worth of damage. Jenkins later recalled that he was sad that it "had come to this" but had been spurred on by a "democratic deficit", although the Western Mail denounced the attack as "a deplorable disservice to Wales".

=== Further targets ===
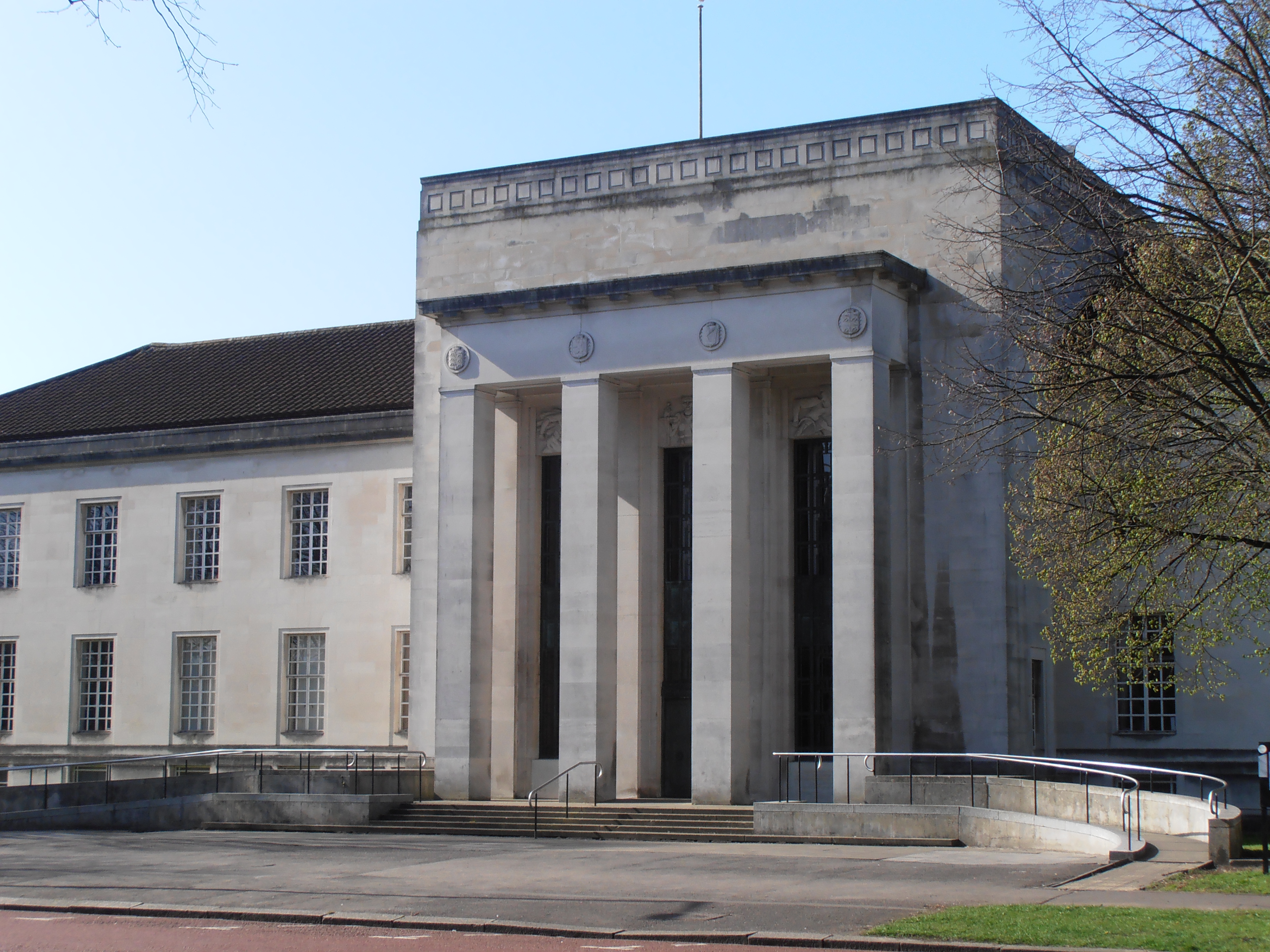
The Temple of Peace in Cardiff was the target of MAC's second bombing

The successful bombing of the Llanrhaeadr-ym-Mochnant pipeline suggested to Jenkins that the use of explosives was the best way to attract the significant media attention that the organisation wanted, encouraging him to pick further targets. His targets were drawn from a list of "interests of the British State", comprising tax offices, water pipelines, government buildings and infrastructure. He also developed a policy that, each time a member of the Royal Family or "those involved with the planning of the investiture" travelled to Wales, a bomb would be set off. Two months after the pipeline bombing, a second device was detonated at 4:04 a.m. on 17 November 1967 outside the Temple of Peace in Cardiff causing damage to the front hall. The MAC operative who undertook the action has never been identified, with Jenkins and others refusing to divulge the information. The Temple of Peace had been selected as it was due to host a meeting of the Investiture Organising Committee and also as a planned protest by the Welsh Language Society (WLS) was due to take place later the same day. Jenkins claimed that he believed the police would likely be more heavy-handed in dealing with the protest in the aftermath of a bombing, which would cause further outrage. The disruption at the protest led to 14 arrests being made.

Unusually, in wake of the two bombings, the MAC remained largely unknown. The FWA released statements which suggested that the attacks had been orchestrated on their behalf, while authorities also investigated members of the WLS and Plaid Cymru. A third attack was carried out on 5 January 1968 at the Snowdonia Country Club in Penisa'r Waun. The site was selected as it had recently been constructed by a Manchester-based businessman despite opposition from locals. Jenkins stated that the site highlighted the perceived "cultural rape of Wales". Owain Williams also stated that the owner had perpetrated a scheme that angered local residents, selling squares of land in Wales they did not own to "mostly English" buyers. The device consisted of only a small amount of explosives, around 4 pounds (1.8 kg), due to the close proximity of the owner's home and was intended, Jenkins said, as a "symbolic protest". The attack was carried out by two MAC members, Alwyn Jones and George Taylor. (Note: Taylor's family have denied he had any involvement with the MAC.) Police arrested Williams, who had previously served a year in prison for his part in actions at the Tryweryn site, before releasing him on bail on 29 February. Williams and Jenkins met the following day in Loggerheads, Denbighshire where Jenkins was leading a procession of his marching band for Saint David's Day. Williams fled to the Republic of Ireland the next day.

With their supply of explosives provided by Pritchard exhausted, Jenkins and Alders broke into Hafod Quarry near Wrexham. The site's security system had been disabled by an employee who was known to the MAC, allowing the pair to gain access unnoticed and steal nearly a quarter of a ton of materials. Their next target was a tax office in Llanishen; Jenkins and Alders delivered a 10-pound (4.5 kg) explosive device to Cardiff MAC members a week before the attack, which took place on 24 March 1968. Jenkins had previously used timer devices purchased from Woolworths stores, but had been tipped off that staff and special branch officers had begun monitoring their sale. Instead, he constructed his own timer devices by using dentistry drill equipment from his army base to convert alarm clocks. The first police officer to arrive at the tax office after the explosion described a scene of devastation: "the damage was total destruction on the ground and the basement was gone." The roof of the building suffered extensive damage and a burst water main flooded other parts of the office.

=== Public attention and political influence ===
Jenkins began to fear that the bombings were failing to attract the required attention after the Llanishen attack and that the public "was getting used to the explosions". He was also concerned that the FWA was taking much of the credit for the actions of the MAC. In response, he scheduled a secret press conference, in which three journalists, Emyr Jones of the Wrexham Leader, Harold Pendlebury of the Daily Mail and freelance writer Ian Skidmore, were allowed into a darkened room where Jenkins sat. To verify his identity, he described the devices that had been used in the Llanishen attack and the amount of explosives taken from Hafod Quarry. In the conference, Jenkins threatened to target the upcoming investiture of Prince Charles, which immediately attracted the attention of English authorities. The story was suppressed from being released in the press and police contacts of the MAC confirmed that undercover officers were being despatched to Wales to heighten security. The growing threat of Welsh militancy prompted the establishment of a special police task force, led by Jock Wilson, which became known as the "Shrewsbury Unit" due to the location of its headquarters.

George Thomas was appointed Secretary of State for Wales in April 1968 and confidently predicted that the violence that had disrupted the nation had ended. Seven weeks later, the MAC bombed Thomas' office at Crown Buildings, Cathays Park, shattering more than 200 windows and causing an estimated £5,000 worth of damage. The original plan had included a simultaneous attack on the newly constructed Welsh Office building in Mold, but a miscommunication among MAC members led the Cathays Park office to be attacked four days earlier than planned. With security increased after the bombing, the attack on Mold was abandoned.

Between May and July 1968, the MAC carried out two more bombings. The first caused minor structural damage to the concrete support of a water pipeline between Lake Vyrnwy and Liverpool, although the supply itself was unaffected and Jenkins described the attack as being "botched". The second targeted a Liverpool Corporation viaduct at the Chester–Warrington railway crossing. The site employed full-time security and had been described as "unbreachable" but the MAC explosive device, containing 17 pounds (7.7 kg) of dynamite, was successfully detonated, causing the pipeline to shatter. The resulting breach sent a fountain of water around 300 feet (91 m) into the air and effectively halved the water supply to Liverpool. The actions of the MAC have been credited by some as a major factor in the increased support for Plaid Cymru in elections during the period. The movement had gained such momentum that the MAC was even prompted to put forward candidates for election, although Jenkins quickly dismissed the notion. He believed that the success of the movement was largely down to the threat posed by the bombs, stating "To maximise our position and be most effective, they [the authorities] had to believe we were in a position to kill and that we intended to kill".

After the July bombing of the Chester–Warrington site there was a break in attacks from the MAC. A number of targets remained on the group's list, but either proved too dangerous or did not align with the message they hoped to convey. Jenkins looked to ensure that each target was "politically symbolic and not just an explosion for the sake of an explosion." A bomb attack on RAF Pembrey took place in September 1968, in which a Royal Air Force warrant officer was injured, but was not claimed by any militant group. Both Jenkins and the FWA denied any involvement in the attack and the action has never been attributed. The only further bombing carried out by the MAC in 1968 occurred on 2 December when a mid-Wales cell targeted the Elan Valley pipeline again, this time near Stourbridge. An explosive device was detonated in the early hours of the morning which caused the water supply to be severed.

== 1969 ==
=== Early months ===
In the early months of 1969, the MAC was approached by the Stasi, East Germany's intelligence agency, to become linked to the group. The Stasi offered equipment and financing, offering members the chance to travel to East Germany to undergo training in exchange for potentially carrying out operations for the organisation. Rudi Dutschke had travelled to Wales, attempting to act as a liaison between the two. Jenkins refused the offer, fearing that the influence of the Stasi would be no different to serving English forces and that Dutschke would be a security risk. An alliance with the Breton Democratic Union was also considered, an idea raised due to links with the poet Harri Webb, but Jenkins again rejected the idea over security concerns. Having avoided any further attacks since December, the MAC decided to target a tax office in Chester to coincide with the visit of the Duke of Norfolk, Bernard Fitzalan-Howard, to the city. Jenkins, working alone, set off an explosive device at the office on 10 April. The device was placed on the first floor roof of an adjoining building, blowing a hole through the tax office wall and shattering around 200 windows.

A number of militant attacks occurred in Cardiff soon afterwards and were linked to the MAC, but Jenkins denied any involvement in them. The MAC's next target was the Prince of Wales monument on the Mackenzie Pier in Holyhead on 25 April. An explosive device was placed at the foot of the monument but failed to detonate. The timing mechanism on the bomb, which contained around 6 pounds (2.7 kg) of gelignite, had jammed and the device was discovered by a crane driver.

=== Investiture bombings ===
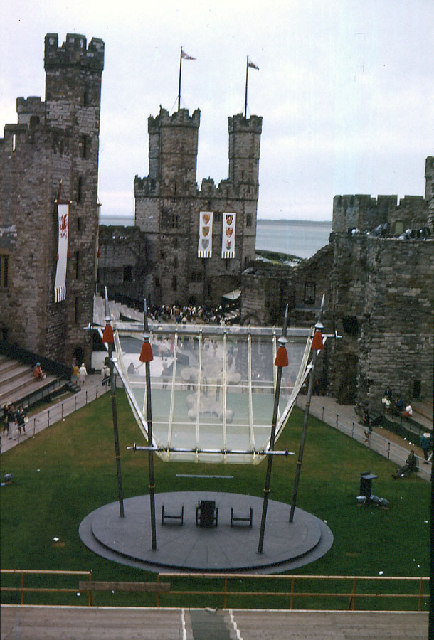
Caernarfon Castle set up for the investiture of Prince Charles, 30 June 1969

Jenkins turned his attention to the upcoming investiture of Prince Charles. On 30 June 1969, the evening before the investiture, two members of the MAC, Alwyn Jones and George Taylor, were killed when a bomb they had been intending to place outside government offices in Abergele exploded. Although authorities have claimed the actual target was the railway line at Abergele, Jenkins has denied this, stating that he informed Jones to "target any government office that was not near the train". Jenkins only discovered the accident the following day while on duty and it took him several hours to ascertain which of the four active groups in the area had been killed. When he returned home, Jenkins broke down to his wife and confessed that he had provided the device to the pair, stating that he was "absolutely shattered" by the events.

The MAC's plans continued nonetheless, with a second explosive being planted in the garden of the Chief Constable of Gwynedd police. The device was timed to detonate at 2:15 p.m., moments before a 21-gun salute began to mark a welcome to the Royal Family in order to undermine the ceremony. Jenkins remarked that this plan "worked like a dream".

Another device, supplied to a cell leader in Caernarfon days beforehand, was planted in an iron forge near the castle but failed to go off; Jenkins had instructed the member to place the bomb "where it won't hurt anybody, but will cause symbolic damage." He believed that the person instructed to plant the bomb had done so hurriedly, fearing detection with the increased police attention in the area, and failed to properly prime the device. When he discovered that the device had failed, Jenkins instructed a member of the MAC to inform the police of the location. He feared trying to retrieve the bomb, believing the site would be under watch by police. The local force had been inundated with prank calls and failed to act on the tip off. The device was found four days later by Ian Cox, a 10-year-old boy on holiday in the town. He had been playing football nearby and activated the device while retrieving his ball. Cox lost his right foot in the incident and suffered severe burns to his other leg. He spent weeks in hospital and required repeated surgery over the following decade. The final bomb was placed on Llandudno Pier and was designed to stop the Royal Yacht Britannia from docking; this too failed to explode and lay undetected for several months.

Jenkins maintained that the devices were always designed to cause as much disruption as possible while ensuring that no one was hurt. Some members of the MAC had suggested a possible assassination attempt of Prince Charles. Jenkins had immediately dismissed the idea, believing such an attack would "alienate" the Welsh public.

== Final attack and capture ==
=== Last MAC actions ===
Jenkins contemplated leaving the MAC after the events in Caernarfon, despite considering them a relative success. He drafted a letter to Alders, relinquishing the leadership of the group to him, which Alders rejected. Jenkins continued as the head of the organisation and the MAC carried out an attack on the South Stack Relay Station, a communications network which was a direct link between the British authorities and their soldiers operating in Northern Ireland during the 1960s. The attack was planned as a show of protest against the ongoing British actions in Ulster. He also instructed Alders to place a bomb at a council office in Chester. Alders instead disabled the device, having grown concerned about the group's actions in the preceding months. The bomb was discovered at 7 a.m. the following day, on 17 August 1969.

By this point, Jenkins had begun to believe he was under suspicion and, on 18 September, he was visited by two officers while at Saighton Camp. The officers left appearing satisfied with his answers to their routine questions, but Jenkins noted that others around him, including his superior officers, had begun to act unusually and believed that they had been made aware of his allegiances to the MAC. He moved the remaining explosives that had been stolen from Hafod Quarry from the hiding place at his camp to Alders' home in Rhosllanerchrugog, fearing that the area was being searched in secret.

=== Arrest and trial ===
Jenkins and Alders were arrested at their homes on 2 November 1969 and taken to Ruabon police station. Jenkins later stated that he gave the name of his solicitor to the police but the officers made no attempt to contact him. Two explanations for the discovery of Jenkins' identity have been reported. His own belief was that when he met with Owain Williams at Loggerheads in February 1968, Williams broke MAC protocol by bringing his girlfriend. She remained in the car, but is believed to have seen Jenkins in his marching band regalia which could be easily traced. Williams maintained that the breach in security was made by Alders' ex-fiancée Ann Woodgate, who had grown jealous of her former partner's new girlfriend and had reported the pair to the police. After giving their statements, Jenkins and Alders were both formally charged with breaking and entering and the theft of explosive equipment at Hafod Quarry. Over the following fortnight, they were further charged in relation to several explosions in Cheshire and Denbighshire between 1968 and 1969 and one in Chester. The final stores of explosives that the MAC possessed were detonated by another member on 5 November, under the cover of the night's fireworks celebrations.

Jenkins and Alders were remanded in custody and held in HM Prison Shrewsbury for several weeks before being transferred to HM Prison Risley. Their trial began on 9 April 1970; Tasker Watkins lead the prosecution with 19 charges in total levied against Jenkins, whom the judge described as a "clever, ruthless fanatic". Jenkins initially pleaded not guilty to the charges. With Jenkins' approval, Alders reached an agreement with the authorities to plead guilty to eight charges in exchange for information and the remaining seven charges against him being dropped. Woodgate and Alders provided damning evidence against Jenkins, more so than he had anticipated, which led him to change his plea during the trial and plead guilty to all counts. Jenkins had also begun to fear that a long trial would ultimately lead to other members of the organisation being revealed. Defending Jenkins, Peter Thomas QC said that his actions had been "activated by the disaster at Aberfan" and that he "was not motivated by greed, or by self-interest... but by a deep and intense concern for Wales and its future." In his closing arguments Watkins countered that the MAC was "wedded to the use of violence, and comprised of members who scorn the ordinary peaceful methods of achieving political objectives."

Jenkins had effectively been found guilty of high treason, a crime that carried the maximum sentence of death by hanging, although this was never considered a likely outcome. He was sentenced to ten years for his crimes; Alders received six, despite his plea deal originally being intended to limit his sentence to five years. After being sentenced, Jenkins was moved to HM Prison Birmingham. Authorities attempted to extract the names of other MAC members from him, but he refused, although he did reveal the location of the unexploded device at Llandudno Pier which had lain undetected since the investiture. In May 1970, Jenkins launched an appeal against his ten-year sentence, claiming that the trial judge had been misled and that they were naive in "Welsh political matters". He also challenged Alders' testimony, supported by his offer to step down from the MAC after the incident in Abergele only to be dissuaded by Alders. His appeal was rejected, with Jenkins remarking "I knew it would be, because I was accusing the British state and establishment of having acted immorally; while, in contrast, the MAC campaign was based on morality – and that, they couldn't bloody stand."

== Prison ==
At the end of May 1970, Jenkins was transferred to HM Prison Wormwood Scrubs where he initially worked in the prison shop alongside Buster Edwards and other members of the Great Train Robbery. After a year there, he lodged another unsuccessful appeal over the length of the sentence, this time with the European Court of Human Rights in Strasbourg. He also began writing articles that were published in Welsh Nation, a Plaid Cymru periodical where his friend was the editor. Several members of the party soon complained about his inclusion and he was ultimately banned from the publication. He was moved to HM Prison Albany on the Isle of Wight soon afterwards, along with other militant prisoners such as members of the IRA including Joe Cahill, after the prison authorities received information that the IRA were planning on landing a helicopter in the prison grounds to pick up its incarcerated members as well as Jenkins.

In Albany, Jenkins was regarded as top-tier prisoner amongst inmates, effectively elevating him in status over petty criminals and sex offenders. He acquired two prisoners who acted as minders for him and he was also assigned a job by the prison governor, similar to a clerk; Jenkins took notes during officer meetings and typed up documents for the prison's civil office. Jenkins and his wife Thelma divorced in June 1972. Unusually for a Category A prisoner, he was awarded legal responsibility for their children's welfare and education. He appointed two guardians, Trefor and Eileen Beasley, both of whom worked at his children's school, to oversee their development during his imprisonment. Trefor was a former member of the MAC, although Jenkins believed the authorities were unaware of this, but he was denied visits from them by prison officials. Jenkins also stated that the Beasleys were visited by police and discouraged from visiting him. In response, he went on hunger strike between 21 August and 30 September, losing 1.5 stone in weight, before ending the protest after a request by the Preservation of the Rights of Prisoners. The European Court of Human Rights also expressed their concern over Jenkins being denied access to issues of Le Peuple Breton, a newspaper from Breton. He was briefly transferred to HM Prison Bristol in December 1972 to receive visitors, including his children and mother.

In September 1973, Jenkins and one of his "minders" were among 37 prisoners in Britain to enrol on a course to obtain a degree in social sciences from the Open University. The pair passed the course after three years, the only two students to do so. After a campaign led by Dafydd Elis-Thomas MP and the Welsh Political Prisoners Defence Committee, Jenkins' status as a Category A prisoner was officially downgraded to B status in May 1975, although Jenkins stated that this made little difference to his experience in prison.

== Release ==
Jenkins was released from prison on 15 June 1976. During his last weeks in prison, he had been approached by a friend about taking up a job as an assistant manager in a computer department of the Iranian government in Tehran. Despite having never used a computer, Jenkins was keen on the opportunity to start a new life but delays in processing his inoculations and travel documents by officials, deliberately according to Jenkins, resulted in the offer expiring. He returned to North Wales, also purchasing a ferry ticket to Dublin to confuse authorities about his movements, where he stayed at the home of Watcyn Owen. After several nights, he returned to his parents' home in Penbryn where he resided for six months. Owain Williams provided Jenkins with a patch of land on his farm near Pwllheli with the idea of building a bungalow. Williams advertised for donations, but the money raised fell well short of the costs required and the idea was abandoned.

He met Lowri Morgan, a former member of the Welsh Language Society and the daughter of Trefor Richard Morgan, while in prison and the pair moved in together in February 1977. Later that year, Jenkins was appointed a community organiser by the South Wales Anti-Poverty Action Centre (SWAPAC), an organisation which supported people in Merthyr living in poverty. In late 1978, Jenkins was arrested in Cardiff for "importuning a male to engage in sexual activity" in a public toilet. Although he admitted to participating in the encounter, he believes that the incident had been orchestrated by the authorities to trap him, a view that was supported by the judges refusal to issue a fine over the incident.

In 1979, he applied to Swansea University for a one-year course on Social and Community Work. During the period between his application and course interview, the Welsh nationalist group Meibion Glyndŵr launched an arson attack on English-owned holiday homes in Wales. Jenkins attended an interview for the course in February 1980, during which he disclosed his previous activities with the MAC and time in prison. He was rejected from the course, despite receiving approval from the subject tutors. He later discovered that the decision had been vetoed by the University Committee, led by Robert Walter Steel, who falsely claimed that he had been involved in the Meibion Glyndŵr attack. An irate Jenkins gave a television interview the following month to Nationwide in which he discussed the attack. This, coupled with an anonymous note claiming responsibility for the attack that was signed by someone claiming to be from the MAC, led Jenkins to be one of numerous people arrested as part of Operation Tân ("Fire"). He was later released without charge.

Jenkins worked for SWAPAC until September 1981, leaving his position to undertake a two-year diploma course in Sociology and Humanities at the University College of South Wales. He also began studying for a certificate in social work and served as the student representative for the social work department at the University Court of Governors. During this time, a series of bombings were carried out at various sites around Wales. Jenkins was brought in for questioning during the investigation and held for numerous days as police alleged that he had provided one of the suspected perpetrators, Dafydd Ladd, with the address of a safehouse. Ladd had previously met Jenkins while imprisoned in HM Prison Albany following his conviction for offences related to his involvement with the militant anarchist group the Angry Brigade. After being held for several days, Jenkins began to fear that he would lose his place on his university course and asked his solicitor for advice on how the situation could be brought to an end. On this advice, Jenkins confessed to providing Ladd with an address, although he maintained that this was not true and was only done to ensure he would be released to continue his studies. Seeking to distance himself from any connections, Jenkins took a job as a social worker in London and spent 17 months in the role. He graduated from his university course in 1983.

== Return to prison and later life ==
In his final year of studies, Jenkins had travelled back and forth to Cardiff to attend preliminary hearings over the charge of assisting Ladd on a £5,000 bail. The case concluded in November 1983 at Cardiff Crown Court. The charge was expected to result in a fine, with his solicitor being assured as such by Tasker Watkins, who was then a senior judge in the region. To Jenkins' surprise, he was given a two-year custodial sentence. He was held at HM Prison Cardiff until the following month, when he was transferred to HM Prison Dartmoor. He was transferred to a low-security prison in January 1985, before being released two months later and returning to live in Cardiff. He was able to return to roles within the social care network, first working for Brighton Housing Trust before returning to London to oversee a housing project for people suffering from physical disabilities. In this role, he completed a diploma in counselling and supervision and set up his own counselling service which he ran until July 1994.

He subsequently returned to social work for Barking and Dagenham London Borough Council, a position he held for 18 months before the department was alerted to Jenkins' criminal past by a police tip-off. He was asked to divulge the nature of his previous offences, but refused stating that the council "was not an arm of the state". The council issued an ultimatum to Jenkins to disclose his history and he instead chose to resign from the role. He retired soon afterwards, finishing his working life as a counsellor again.

In 2017, he fell at his home and broke his hip. After recuperating in hospital, he moved into a residential nursing home. Jenkins died on 17 December 2020 in Wrexham Maelor Hospital at the age of 87.
