= United Nations Association Wales =

UN values campaign group in Wales

The United Nations Association Wales (UNA Wales) (Welsh: Cymdeithas y Cenhedloedd Unedig Cymru) is an organisation campaigning in Wales to make the ideals of the United Nations a reality. It campaigns, lobbies and raises awareness on issues of disarmament, conflict prevention, sustainable development and human rights. It aims to promote informed debate on international issues, including the UN system itself.

UNA Wales is based at the Temple of Peace, Cardiff and is affiliated with the Welsh Centre for International Affairs.

== See also ==
- United Nations Association UK
- Foreign relations of Wales
