= Welsh Centre for International Affairs =

Think tank in Cardiff, Wales

- Canolfan Materion Rhyngwladol Cymru
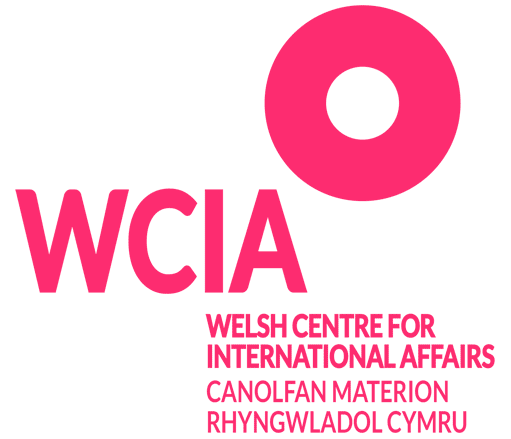

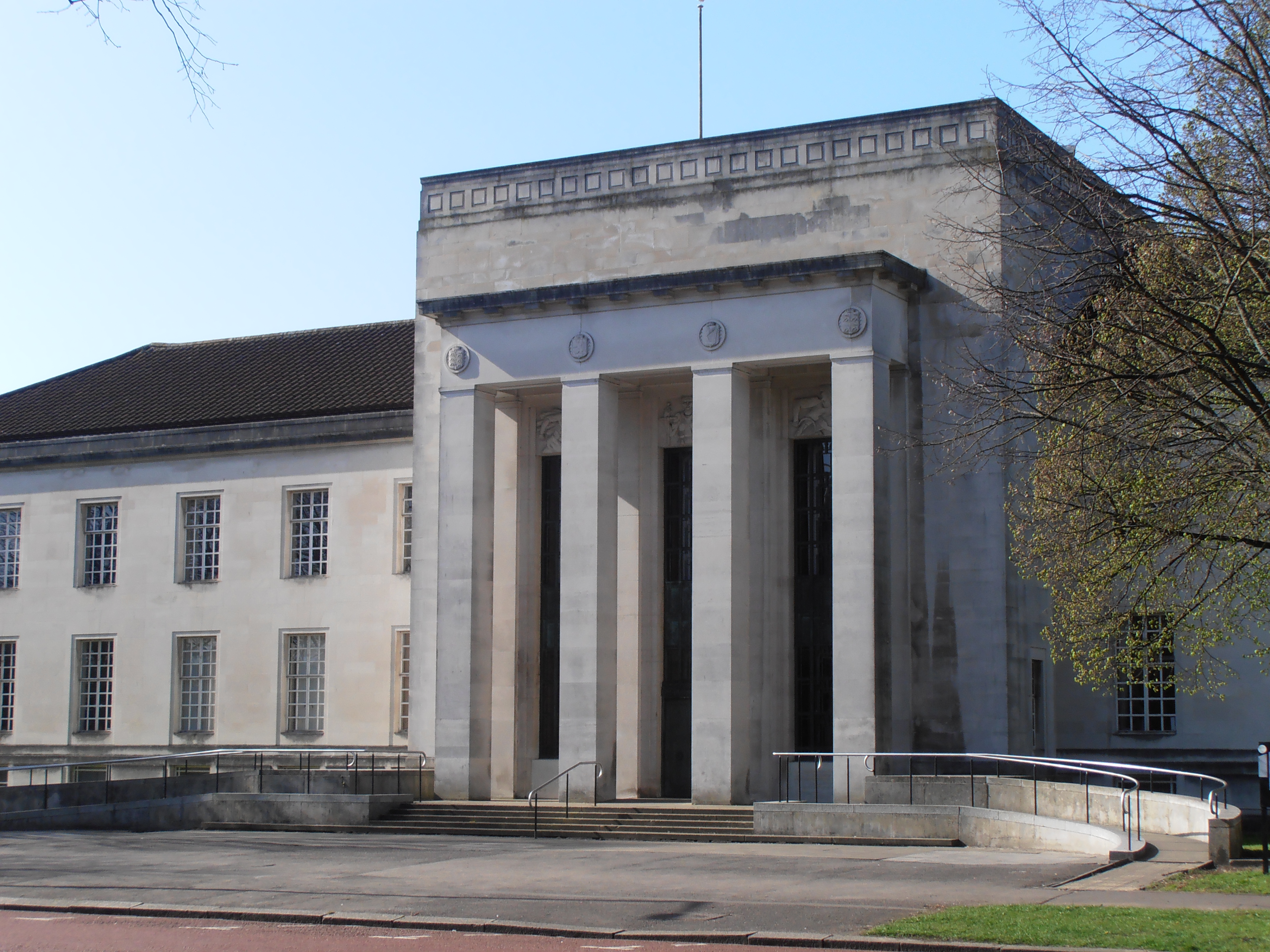
- WCIA headquarters, Temple of Peace, Cardiff
- Formation: 1973; 53 years ago
- Legal status: Non-profit company
- Purpose: To inspire people to learn and act on global issues so everyone in Wales can contribute to creating a fairer and more peaceful world.
- Location(s): Temple of Peace and Health; Cathays Park, Cardiff, Wales CF10 3AP
- Region served: Wales
- CEO: Susie Ventris-Field
- Chair: Peter Sargent
- Expenses: £1.1M (2017–18)
- Endowment: £1.2M (2017–18)
- Website: www.wcia.org.uk
- Formerly called: Welsh League of Nations Union

Welsh Centre for International Affairs (WCIA) is a Welsh international affairs and strategy think tank. It was established in 1973 to promote the exchange of ideas on international issues, build international partnerships connecting Welsh people and organisations with the world, and encourage global action in communities and organisations across Wales. It is based in the Temple of Peace in Cardiff, Wales.

It has been a charity trust since its inception in 1973 and became a registered charity with the Charity Commission in 2014. It had an endowment of £1.2m in 2017–18.

== History ==
The predecessor of the Welsh Centre for International Affairs was established as the Welsh League of Nations Union (WLNU) which was organized for a campaign for peace and international cooperation in Wales after World War I. David Davies came up with the idea for the at the National Eisteddfod of Wales in Neath in August 1918. A regional committee of the British League met on 25 May 1920 to organize the WLNU's first conference, held in Llandrindod Wells. David Davies and Rev. Gwilym Davies met on 10 January 1922 to plan "a semi-autonomous Welsh national body affiliated to the British League" that could coordiante its own campaigns. Their plan was approved by the Welsh League Committee on 31 January 1922.

Annie Jane Hughes Griffiths was the group's first chair and Gwilym Davies was its honorary director. WLNU held its first national conference during Easter 1922. The organization grew to 61,262 members across 1,014 community groups.

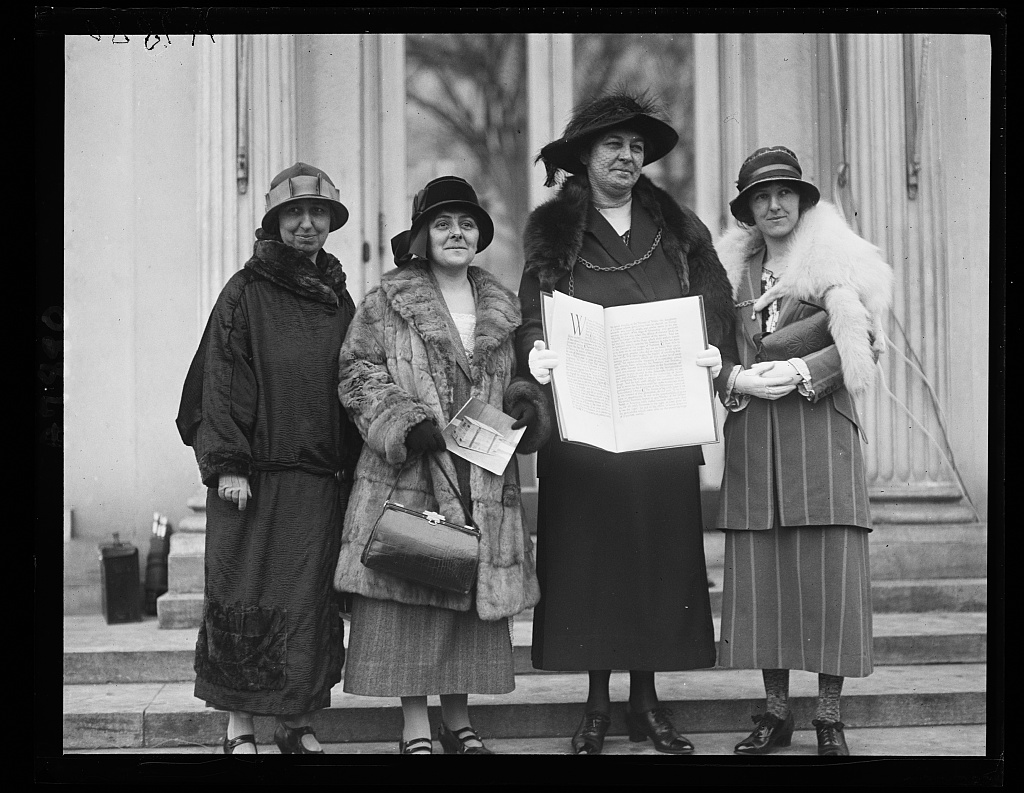
Annie Jane Hughes Griffiths holding the Welsh Women's Peace Petition outside the White House with Ruth Morgan, Elined Prys, and Mary Elizabeth Ellis

In January 1924, WLNU sent Mary Elizabeth Ellis, the wife of Davies, to the United States to promote peace via a petition signed by 390,296 Welsh women, and to encourage the United States to join the League of Nations. Ellis met with Eleanor Roosevelt, Carrie Chapman Catt, and others in New York City. She then traveled to Washington, D.C. where she presented the petition—known as the Welsh Women's Peace Petition—to the National Committee for the Prevention of War and met President Calvin Coolidge at the White House. Hughes-Griffiths, Ellis, and Elined Pry, known as the Welsh Women’s Peace Delegation to America, then tourned the United States, spreading the message of the WLNU.

The organisation's headquarters, the Welsh National Temple of Peace and Health in the Cathays Park area of Cardiff, Wales, was built in November 1938 by Minnie James of Dowlais, a bereaved mother of World War I victims, David Davies MP (later known as Lord Davies of Llandinam), and the King Edward VII Welsh National Memorial Association. The land was also gifted by the Montgomeryshire MP.

In its early years, the Wales'Temple of Peace housed the King Edward VII Association, the United Nations Association (UNA) Wales, and in 1970 a successor organisation was proposed, which became the WCIA.

The initiative for the foundation of the WCIA came in 1968 through a Western Mail editorial, which called for "Welshmen to look beyond the confines of Wales and Britain to extend their knowledge and understanding of the rest of the world." The Secretary of State for Wales, George Thomas MP, was integral to bringing together the Association's Standing Conference. Among the early supporters were the Welsh Office, nearby local authorities, the University of Wales and education colleges, MPs, trade unionists, industrialists, churches, political parties, members of the media, and voluntary organisations. The opening ceremony was held on 11 October 1973 by Lady Tweedsmuir, Minister of State at the Foreign and Commonwealth Office.

In 2014, the WCIA merged with CEWC Cymru (Council for Education in World Citizenship Wales) and UNA Wales (United Nations Association Wales).

The organisation's headquarters, the Temple of Peace, was previously owned by Public Health Wales, but was sold to nearby Cardiff University in 2017.

== See also ==
- Foreign relations of Wales
- List of think tanks in Wales
- Institute of Welsh Affairs - a think tank promoting civic discussion in Wales
