= Margaret Quass =

British educationalist and activist

- Born: 6 April 1926
- Died: 9 December 2003 (aged 77)
- Occupations: Educationalist, activist
- Known for: Citizenship education

Margaret Isobel Quass OBE (1926-2003) was a British educationalist and activist. Between 1974 and 1986, she was director of the Council for Education in World Citizenship (CEWC).

== Biography ==
Quass was educated at South Hampstead High School, Cambridge University and the London School of Economics. She started her career teaching in Watford and then joined the CEWC staff. She was involved in Mass Observation. In 1954 she visited Russia, and reported back in the journal of the National Peace Council. She was a founder member of the Friends of UNESCO, a member of the Fabian Society, a member of the international council of the United World College of the Atlantic, and a supporter of the Voice of the Listener and Viewer.

Quass was awarded an OBE for services to education. She left money on her death to CEWC.

== Legacy ==
The Citizenship Foundation holds an annual Margaret Quass Debate in her memory.
