= Mary Elizabeth Ellis (activist) =

Welsh peace campaigner (1881–1974)

- Born: February 8, 1881; Dolgellau, Wales
- Died: February 15, 1974 (aged 93); Aberystwyth, Wales
- Occupation: Activist
- Spouse: Gwilym Davies (1942)

Mary Elizabeth Ellis (8 February 1881 – 15 February 1974), also known as Mrs Gwilym Davies, was a Welsh peace activist. She was the second woman to hold the position of Inspector of Schools in Wales. She was involved with Bangor University, the women's section of the Welsh League of Nations Union and Urdd Gobaith Cymru.

== Early life and education ==
Ellis was born on 8 February 1881 in Dolgellau. Her father died when she was nine. She attended Dr Williams' School. She studied at University College of Wales, Aberystwyth, but abandoned her degree for health reasons. She resumed her studies at University College of North Wales, Bangor where she graduated in 1904, specialising in English and Latin. She then trained as a teacher.

== Career ==
She taught at Whalley Grange High School in Manchester and as a personal tutor. Between 1909 and 1911, she began teaching English at the École Normale Supérieure, Sèvres. When she returned to England, she taught at the Colston School for Girls in Bristol.

Ellis was the second woman to have been appointed an Inspector of Schools in Wales, a role she was appointed to in 1914. This position required her to earn a qualification in Domestic Economy from Hampstead College, London. By 1919, she was a secretary of the Women's Section of the Welsh School of Social Service, and, in 1922, she attempted to establish the Union of Welsh Women.

Mary Ellis was a prominent member of the delegation that travelled to the United States to present the Welsh Women's Peace Petition to American women in 1924. In New York, she met with dignitaries such as Eleanor Roosevelt and Carrie Chapman Catt. While in the USA, she visited progressive schools but received an official warning from the Board of Education for misusing the visit.

In the 1930s, she became a member of the Women's Committee of the Welsh League of Nations Union and continued to play an active role in the Welsh School of Social Service.

She remained in the inspectorate for the Welsh Department of the Board of Education until 1943, initially living in Penarth and focusing on South Wales, but, in 1927, she moved to Dolgellau and also became responsible for North Wales.

== Personal life ==
In 1922, she met Gwilym Davies, who was director of the Welsh School of Social Service. He was also a well-known figure in the League of Nations and founded the Message of Peace and Good Will, which later became the annual Urdd Peace and Goodwill Message. She married him in January 1942 and they moved to Aberystwyth.

== Death ==
She died in Aberystwyth on 15 February 1974, aged 93, and was buried in Llanelltyd churchyard.
