= Council for Education in World Citizenship =

The Council for Education in World Citizenship (CEWC) was an educational charity that was founded in England in 1939. It operated a number of "regional councils", which later became independent charities, in Wales (CEWC-Cymru) and Northern Ireland (CEWC Northern Ireland). By 2014, the charities in England and Northern Ireland were no longer operating, and the Welsh organisation had been merged into the Welsh Centre for International Affairs.

== History ==
The Council for Education in World Citizenship (CEWC) was founded in 1939, "in the shadow of the Second World War, by educationists determined to keep international ideals alive and to encourage schoolchildren to study world problems." It was established by the education committee of the League of Nations Union (LNU), and continued to work with the LNU's successor, the UK United Nations Association (UNA). It was involved in global citizenship education. The original chairperson of the CEWC was the academic Gilbert Murray (1866–1957).

List of CEWC Secretaries and Directors
Name	Title	Term of Office	Notes & Reference
Charles Judd	Secretary	1939–1946	Judd was the founding force behind CEWC's creation, having led the break from the League of Nations Union's Education Committee in 1939–40.
Monica Luffman	Secretary	1947	Departed to join UNESCO.
David Ennals, Baron Ennals	Secretary	1947–1952	Was a British Labour Party politician and campaigner for human rights.
Terence Lawson, OBE	Secretary	1953–1974	Expanded CEWC's scale and influence. Instrumental in aligning CEWC with UNESCO and helped develop ASPNet in the UK.
Margaret Quass, OBE	Director	1974–1986	Took over from Lawson. Continued UNESCO advocacy and led CEWC during a time of political withdrawal from UNESCO.
Various	–	1986–2008	Including Patricia Roger, Les Stratton.

The CEWC operated "regional councils", which later became independent entities, in Northern Ireland (as CEWC Northern Ireland) and in Wales (as CEWC-Cymru). CEWC-Cymru, which was based at the Temple of Peace, Cardiff and had operated independent of the English organisation since at least the 1940s, merged with the Welsh Centre for International Affairs in 2014 and ceased to be a separate charity. While CEWC Northern Ireland obtained separate charitable status in 2001, and was in receipt of some funding from Irish Aid in 2008, its website was defunct by 2011.

The English charity, the Council for Education in World Citizenship, "went into suspension" in April 2001.
