= HM Prison Risley =

Prison in Risley, Warrington, England

Coordinates: 53.4382°N 2.5239°W

HMP Risley
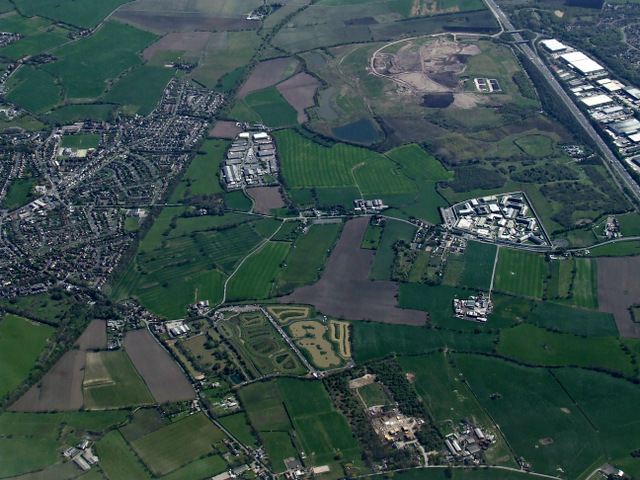
- HMP Risley from the air
- Interactive map of HMP Risley
- Location: Warrington, Cheshire
- Security class: Adult Male/Category C
- Population: 1095 (October 2018)
- Opened: 1964
- Managed by: HM Prison Services
- Governor: Adam Dobson
- Website: Risley at justice.gov.uk

HM Prison Risley is a category C men's prison, located in the Risley area of Warrington, Cheshire, England, operated by His Majesty's Prison Service.

== History ==
Risley opened as a remand centre for male and female inmates in 1964. A category C prison opened on the site in 1990, alongside the remand centre. Risley ceased to hold females in April 1999, and in March 2000, Risley wholly re-roled to a category C prison for adult males.

== Inspection reports ==
In 1988 a report from His Majesty's Chief Inspector of Prisons described the prison as "barbarous and squalid", "appalling and totally unacceptable", "dirty and dilapidated".

A year later, the conditions resulted in a serious outbreak of violence and rioting with some remand prisoners taking control of a significant part of the prison for several days, giving rise to a debate in the House of Commons and calls from the Home Secretary for an inquiry.

In September 2003, an inspection report from the Chief Inspector of Prisons criticised the prison for its policy of mixing sex offenders with other inmates. The report said that sex offenders and other vulnerable inmates did not feel safe from attack and did not trust Prison Officers to protect them.

A further inspection report in July 2006 again highlighted issues over safety. The inspection found that a third of inmates felt unsafe, with "a lack of visible staffing on wings when prisoners were unlocked from their cells." The report also highlighted concerns about the prison's anti-bullying, suicide and self-harm prevention work. However, the report did praise prison management for reducing the quantity of drugs smuggled into the prison.

In October 2008, another inspection report from the Chief Inspector of Prisons severely criticised the prison, stating that "a culture of hard drugs and violence remained rife", according to the BBC. Of inmates suspected of taking drugs, more than 60% tested positive, while gangs were rampant, offering membership for a £50 joining fee.

The prison was inspected again in 2013. The report stated that it was improving but there were still areas needing attention. Prisoners felt safe and had received support for substance misuse but too many, about one third, were locked in their cells during the day.

An unannounced inspection was carried out from 12-27 April 2023 by HM Chief Inspector of Prisons.The subsequent report listed 14 ‘key concerns’, five of which were deemed requiring immediate attention. The report highlighted high levels of self-harm among prisoners and a deterioration in living conditions throughout the prison, including shower and other sanitation facilities.

Healthcare provision, particularly in dental health, was poor and there was too little time out of cells for a category C resettlement prison. Education, skills and work-related activity were found to be inadequate and far too many men convicted of sex offences were released without completing their offending behaviour work.

The report went on to say that levels of violence were higher than in other similar prisons and that segregation unit conditions were poor with a limited regime.

A high turnover of Governors and other staff is highlighted as contributing to the inadequacies at Risley and many of the recommendations made at the previous inspection in 2016 were listed as ‘not achieved’ in the inspection report.

== The prison today ==
Risley is a category C prison for adult males convicted of a sex offence and other vulnerable prisoners. Over 1,000 prisoners live at the prison in mostly single cells with in-cell sanitation and phones (calls can be made to previously-vetted numbers and are all recorded). There are landing showers, serveries, and association facilities. In-cell mains power and in-cell TVs are installed throughout the prison.

Work for inmates at Risley includes the kitchen, laundry, stores, cleaning, gardens, waste management and the Braille workshop. In addition, inmates may train for vocations in painting and decorating, joinery, industrial cleaning and construction. Courses in art and design, information technology, and higher level learning (including the Open University programmes) are also available.

Other facilities at the prison include a gym and a multi-faith chaplaincy.

In November 2017 an improvised explosive device was found on one of the wings that did not go off. In December 2017, one of the wings at the prison was without water for a period of three days.

== Notable inmates ==
- Ian Brady and Myra Hindley, Moors Murderers, were on remand at Risley ahead of their 1966 trial
- Paddy Lacey, professional footballer
- Ted Hankey, professional darts player.
- Charles Bronson
- Gary Glitter
