= Gwilym Davies (minister) =

Welsh Baptist minister (1879–1955)

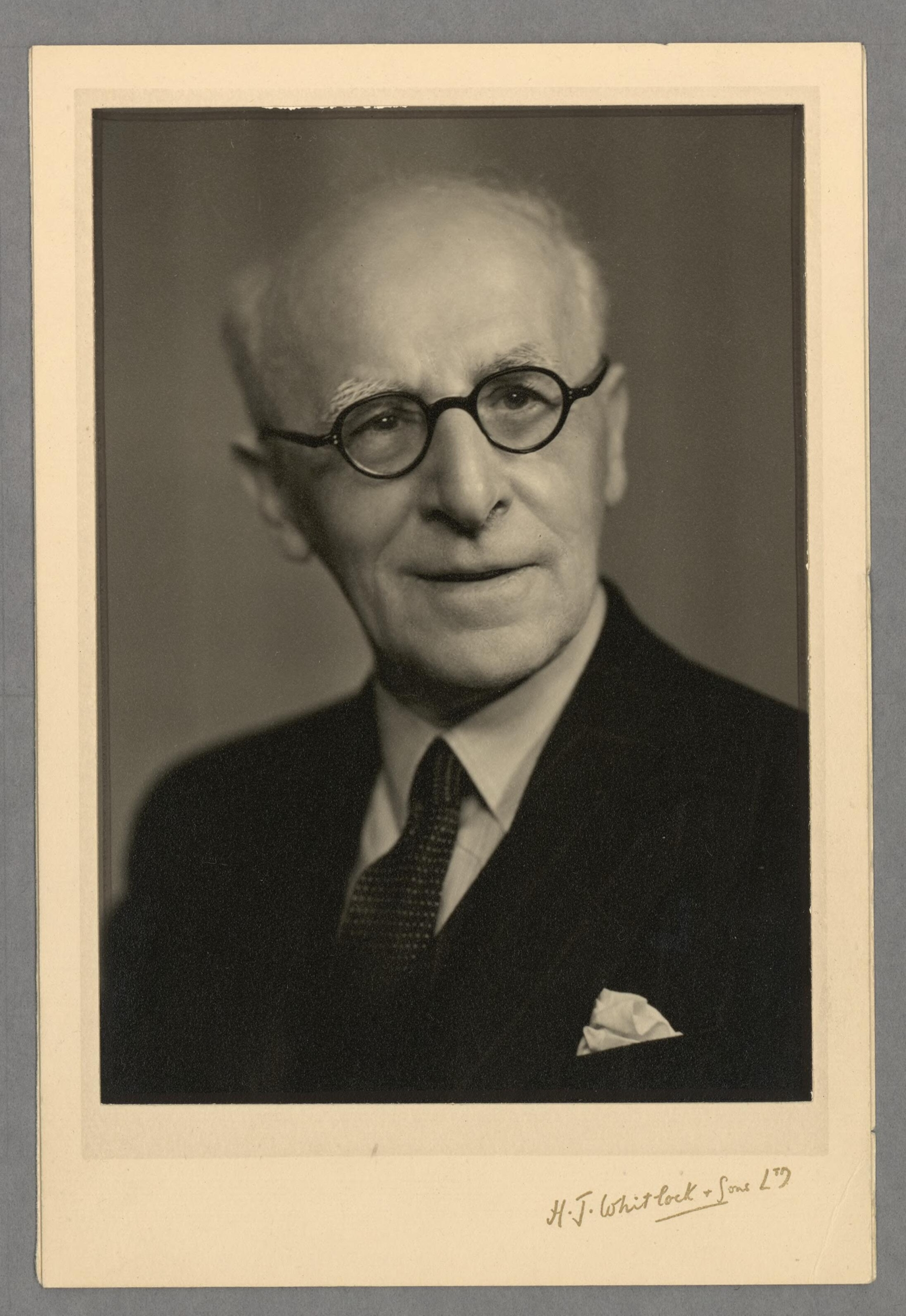
Gwilym Davies (minister)

Gwilym Davies CBE (24 March 1879 – 26 January 1955) was a Welsh Baptist minister, who spent much of his life attempting to enhance international relations through supporting the work of the League of Nations and its successor, the United Nations. He also established the Annual World Wireless Message to Children in 1922, and was the first person to broadcast in Welsh, on St David's Day 1923.

== Life ==
Davies was born on 24 March 1879 at Bedlinog, Glamorgan, in south Wales, to D. J. Davies, a local Baptist minister. He was educated at the grammar school in Llandeilo before training for ordination at the Midland Baptist College in Nottingham. He then won a scholarship to Jesus College, Oxford. He was ordained in 1906, serving first at Broadhaven in Pembrokeshire and then, between 1908 and 1915, in Carmarthen. With encouragement from David Davies (later Lord Davies of Llandinam), he helped to set up the Welsh School of Social Service in 1911. He served as secretary, chairman and president. Between 1915 and 1919, he was the minister in Abergavenny and then he ministered in Llandrindod Wells between 1919 and 1922.

In 1922, he retired from active ministry and spent the rest of his life promoting world peace. He travelled extensively, spending much of his time in Geneva and Cardiff. He established the Annual World Wireless Message to Children in 1922, a message of peace from the youth of Wales to the youth of the world. On St David's Day (1 March) 1923, Davies became the first person to broadcast in the Welsh language. He was the co-founder (with Lord Davies) and honorary director (1922 to 1945) of the Welsh branch of the League of Nations Union, and honorary international secretary of the Union until the League of Nations was dissolved. He organised annual conferences on international education at Gregynog between 1922 and 1939. During the Second World War, he directed the Welsh Education Committee as it drafted a model constitution for an international education organisation, and his draft was influential in the creation of Unesco. After the Second World War, Davies supported the work of the United Nations and Unesco, becoming the first president of the Welsh National Council of the United Nations Association and helping to establish the Welsh Unesco Committee. He wrote articles for journals and newspapers, some of which were collected as Y Byd Ddoe a Heddiw ("The World Yesterday and Today") (1938). He also wrote International Education in the Schools of Wales and Monmouthshire (1926), The Ordeal of Geneva (1933), and Intellectual co-operation between the Wars (1943), as well as The Gregynog Conferences on International Education 1922–37 (1952).

He was appointed a Commander of the Order of the British Empire (CBE) in the 1948 Birthday Honours; in 1954, the University of Wales awarded him an honorary doctorate of laws (LLD). He died in hospital in Aberystwyth on 26 January 1955, aged 75. He was survived by his wife, the peace activist Mary Elizabeth Ellis. They had married during WW2. His ashes were scattered at Lavernock Point, Penarth, where Marconi transmitted the first radio messages across water.
