= Temple of Peace, Cardiff =

Non-religious building in Cardiff, Wales

Coordinates: 51.48733°N 3.18329°W

Temple of Peace and Health
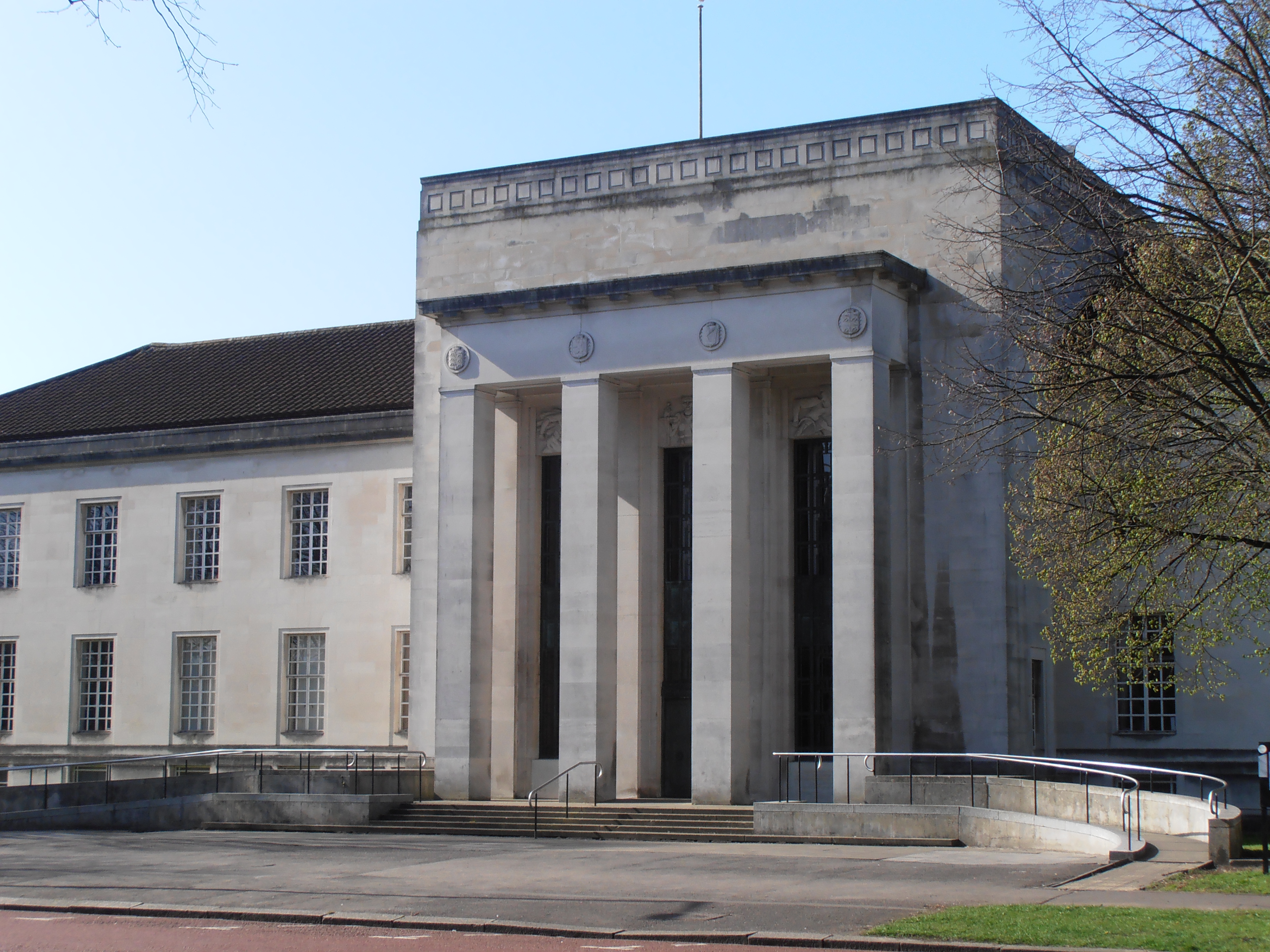
- Interactive map of Temple of Peace and Health
- Location: Cathays Park, Cardiff

History
- Built: 1937–38

Site notes
- Architect: Sir Percy Thomas
- Architectural styles: 1930s German/Italian public building style; Art Deco

Listed Building – Grade II
- Official name: Temple of Peace & Health
- Designated: 19 May 1975
- Reference no.: 13740

The Welsh National Temple of Peace and Health, known as the Temple of Peace and Health (Welsh: Y Deml Heddwch ac Iechyd) or commonly the Temple of Peace (Y Deml Heddwch), is a non-religious civic building in Cathays Park, Cardiff, the capital city of Wales. It was designed by the architect Sir Percy Thomas. Since its foundation, the building has served a dual function as headquarters for health and international affairs organisations.

== Facilities ==
The building's conference and seminar facilities include the 200 capacity Marble Hall, the 50 capacity wood-panelled Council Chamber and a smaller 20 capacity meeting room. The venue has parking nearby and is within walking distance of the northern city centre. It can also be reached by rail transport from Cathays railway station.

== History ==
The Temple of Peace and Health was the brainchild of David Davies, 1st Baron Davies, and was conceived to serve two purposes. The first was to provide a home for the King Edward VII Welsh National Memorial Association, a voluntary organisation dedicated to the prevention, treatment and eradication of tuberculosis, which Davies had founded in 1910. Davies was also the founding president of the Welsh National Council of the League of Nations Union, and in 1934 he pledged £58,000 (equivalent to £3,600,000 in 2025) towards the erection of a building to house the two organisations.

Davies wanted the Temple of Peace and Health to be "a memorial to those gallant men from all nations who gave their lives in the war that was to end war", so it was dedicated to the memory of those who died in that war.

In founding the Temple, Davies intended to combine the goals of peace and health and to express these ideals in the architectural design of the building. The building's architect, Sir Percy Thomas, was awarded the bronze medal by the Royal Institute of British Architects for its design. The foundation stone was laid by Viscount Halifax in 1937. The building opened on 23 November 1938, with a ceremony that featured Minnie James of Dowlais, who lost three of her sons in World War I.

The Temple of Peace and Health was bombed on 17 November 1967 at 4am by the Mudiad Amddiffyn Cymru. The Temple of Peace and Health was chosen as a target due to civil servants using the building as a base to plan the approaching investiture of Prince Charles (now Charles III) as Prince of Wales. It was believed that the bomb had been planted on the lintel and the explosion caused substantial damage to the reception area of the temple, as well as to the facade of the building. Several artifacts that were on display at the time were destroyed by the blast which was heard from over a mile away.

As the bomb did not damage the conference room, the planned meeting went ahead with tightened security and road blocks set up by police throughout Cardiff. Around 450 civic leaders turned up to the event, including the Earl of Snowdon. Police reported their investigation into the bombing was being hampered by the Welsh students, who refused to speak to the police using any language other than Welsh.

In 2018, Cardiff University bought the Temple of Peace from Public Health Wales, although the Welsh Centre for International Affairs remains as leaseholder of part of the building.

== Building ==
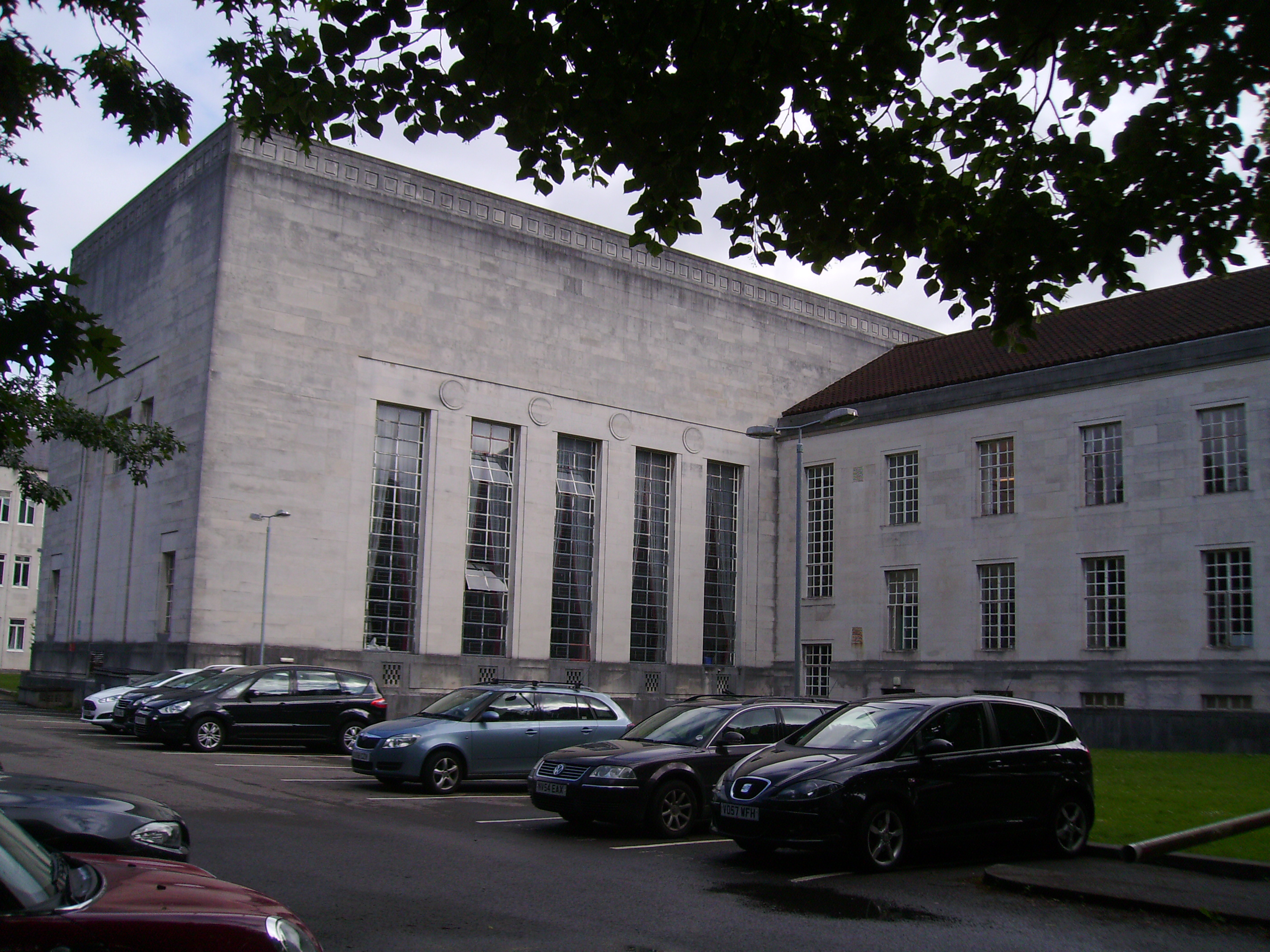
The rear of the Temple of Peace and Health

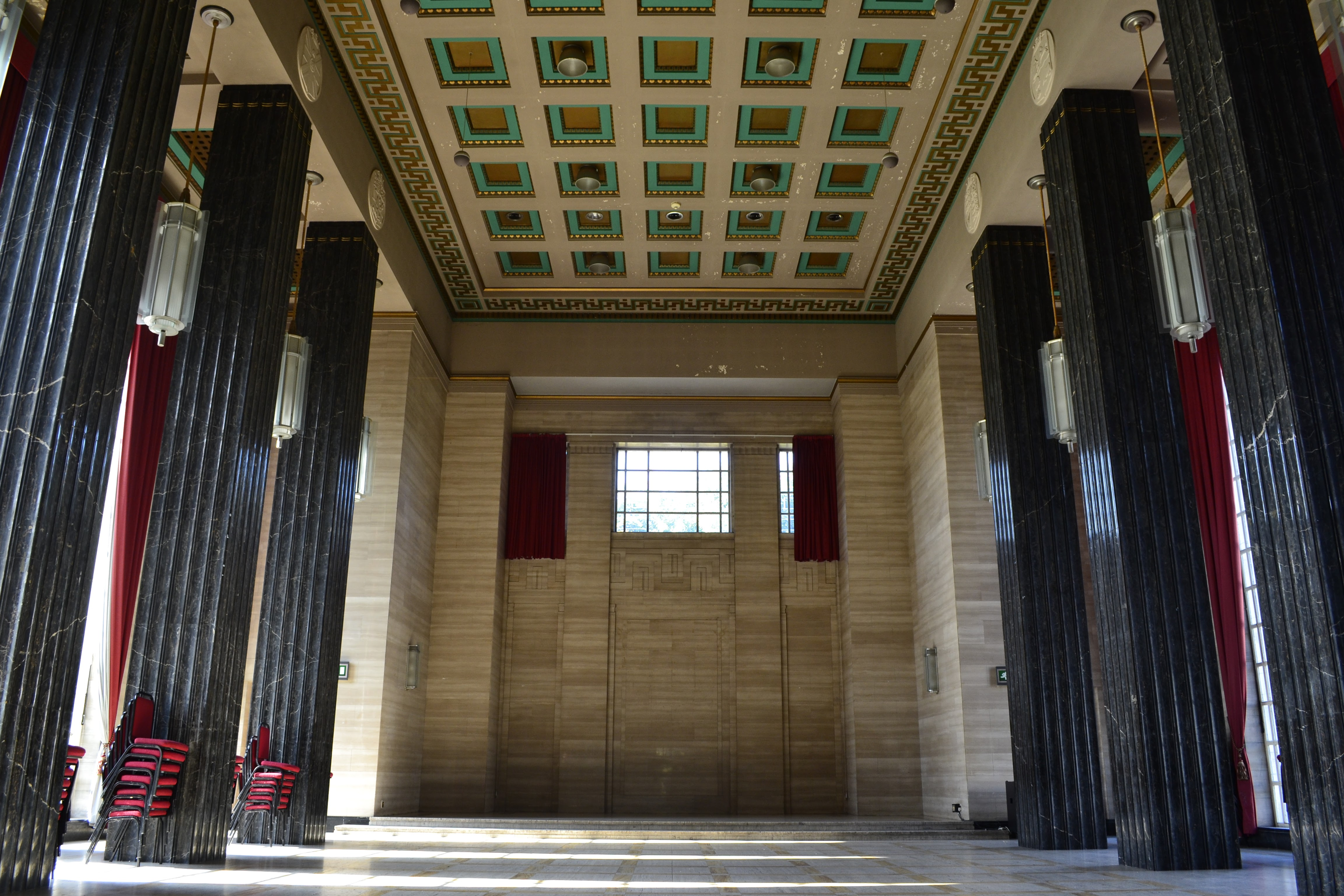
The striking architecture of the interior of the Temple of Peace

The building is in the form of the letter T, with two wings, and is built of Portland stone. The roofs of the wings are dark red Italian pattern tiles. The wings contain offices and committee rooms, on three levels.

=== Marble Hall ===
The central portion of the building, being deliberately higher than the wings, houses the spacious Marble Hall. Situated on the ground floor and facing the main entrance, it is lined with dove-grey marble to symbolise the emblem of peace. It serves as a meeting place of cultural and social organisations, with many lectures and conferences on international issues having been held here; it is also a venue for campaigning groups and social events.

=== The Crypt and the Welsh National Book of Remembrance ===
Situated immediately below the Temple Hall, the Crypt houses a Book of Remembrance for those who died in World War I. It is 1,100 pages long and contains the names of 35,000 men and women who were of Welsh birth or parentage or served in Welsh regiments. As most died on Belgian or French soil, the bronze used on the glass casing of the book is French, and the marble pedestal on which it rests is from Belgium. Concealed lighting illuminates the book from the roof of the Crypt.

=== Council Chamber ===
The Council Chamber is a wood-panelled room on the first floor of the building. It is used as a meeting place, and also houses many books with international themes, including part of Davies' own book collection.

== Use as a filming location ==
Much of the 2005 Doctor Who episode "The End of the World" was filmed in the Marble Hall and other parts of the building. The location was used to represent a space station five billion years in the future. The hall was also used in the episodes "Gridlock" (2007), "The Fires of Pompeii" (2008), "Cold Blood" (2010), "Let's Kill Hitler" (2011) and "Nightmare in Silver" (2013).

The building has also been used as a filming location for other television shows, including the 2010 Sherlock episode "The Blind Banker" and His Dark Materials.

== See also ==
Based at the temple are:

- CEWC-Cymru
- United Nations Association Wales
- Wales Genocide Memorial
- Welsh Centre for International Affairs
