= Llywelyn's coronet =

Lost Welsh treasure

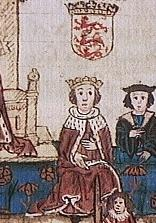
This image is of Llywelyn ap Gruffudd, Prince of Wales, crowned and seated beneath his personal arms. The entire picture depicts his homage to King Henry III of England in 1267 but was painted after the event.

Llywelyn's coronet (Welsh: Talaith Llywelyn) is a lost treasure of Welsh history. It is recorded that Llywelyn ap Gruffudd, Prince of Wales and Lord of Aberffraw had deposited this crown (Welsh: Talaith) and other items (such as the Cross of Neith) with the monks at Cymer Abbey for safekeeping at the start of his final campaign in 1282. He was killed later that year. It was seized alongside other holy artefacts in 1284 from the ruins of the defeated Kingdom of Gwynedd. Thereafter it was taken to London and presented at the shrine of Edward the Confessor in Westminster Abbey by King Edward I of England as a token of the complete annihilation of the independent Welsh state.

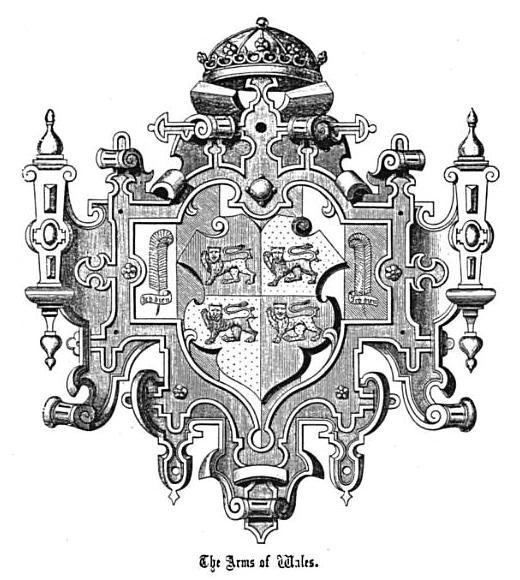
A 16th century illustration by Lewys Dwnn of the "Arms of Wales" which shows the Crown of the Principality surmounting the Arms. In this illustration the "crown" is clearly a coronet and of a curious design. Given that Llywelyn's crown was still in existence at this time and in the possession of the English monarch then this may be a representation of what that original Welsh crown looked like as seized by Edward I in 1283.

Llywelyn's successor was his brother, Dafydd, who claimed Llywelyn's title of Tywysog as Tywysog Cymru or Prince of Wales. His reign was extremely brief; he was killed not long after his brother, without ever having been able to reclaim the precious items from Cymer Abbey.

== Dating the crown ==
The origins of the coronet are unclear. Some sources state that Dafydd ap Llywelyn had been presented with a coronet by Henry III of England on his accession to the throne of Gwynedd in 1240. However, on the occasion of their first meeting Dafydd is described as already wearing a coronet. Rees Davies believes that there were several coronets and among those seized in 1282 was the "Coron Arthur", an older native Welsh treasure, that may have been forged as far back as the reign of Owain Gwynedd (1137–1171) or perhaps earlier, as the princes of Gwynedd sought to consolidate their position as the primary rulers of Wales.

He (Edward) appropriated the most valuable and potent symbols of Welsh princely independence – Llywelyn's coronet, the matrix of his seal, the jewels and crown of Arthur, and above all the most cherished relic in Wales, the piece of the true cross known as Y Groes Naid (just as he removed the Stone of Scone from Scotland in 1296).
R.R. Davies

There is some confusion as to whether Llywelyn's coronet is what was referred to by some chroniclers as the "crown" or "jewel" of Arthur or if this was a separate more treasured artefact.

== After annexation by England ==
According to King Edward I's jewel account for that regnal year (12 Edward I), the crown was recoated in gold plating to make it look more impressive (which suggests that it may have been made of a different, cheaper metal). It was then presented at the shrine of Edward the Confessor in Westminster Abbey as the "Coron Arthur," or the Crown of King Arthur. The coronet, alongside the English Crown Jewels, was kept in Westminster Abbey until 1303 before they were all re-housed in the Tower of London after it and the English Crown Jewels were all temporarily stolen. It is widely thought that Llywelyn's Coronet was destroyed alongside most of the original English crown jewels in 1649 by order of Oliver Cromwell; however, an inventory taken by the new republican administration prior to the destruction of the crown jewels makes no mention of this coronet.

The heraldic badge of Wales Herald Extraordinary which depicts the Cross of Neith atop a Welsh Talaith, logically that of Llywelyn.

== British Prince of Wales regalia ==
In more recent times reconstructed Welsh regalia known as the Honours of the Principality of Wales have been cast for symbolic use during the investiture ceremony of the eldest son of the King of England. The design of these coronets, established in 1672 by King Charles II of England, features "Crosses and flowers de Liz with one Arch and in the midst a Ball and cross". The coronet made in 1911 for the investiture of the future King Edward VIII as Prince of Wales strictly adheres to the style clarified in the 1672 royal warrant. The version created in 1969 for the investiture of Charles, Prince of Wales (the 1911 Crown was still in the possession of the Duke of Windsor in France) has deviated from the classic designs and was made using modern methods. Both coronets are now kept at the National Museum Cardiff.
