= Honours of the Principality of Wales =

Regalia of the Prince of Wales

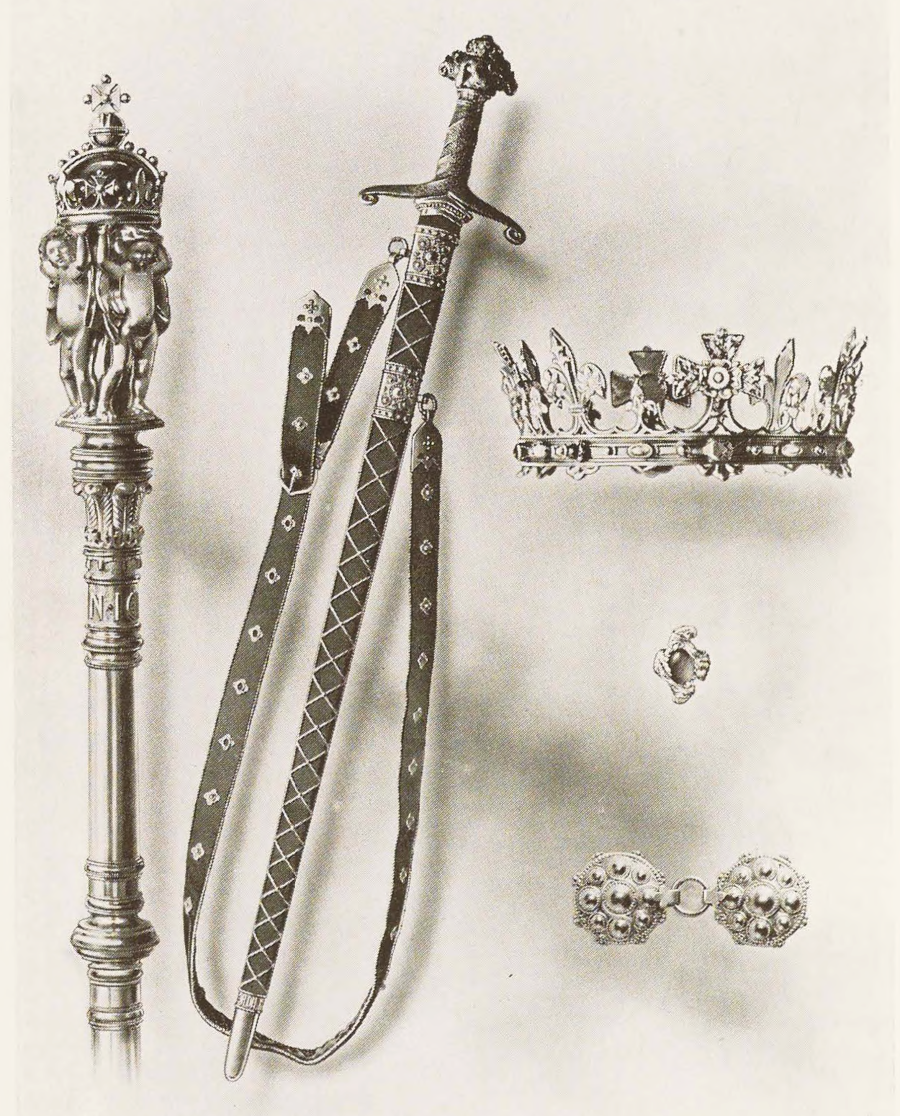
The Honours created in 1911 for the investiture of Edward, Prince of Wales (later Edward VIII). Clockwise from left: Rod (or verge), sword, circlet (or chaplet), ring and clasp.

The Honours of the Principality of Wales are the regalia used at the investiture of the Prince of Wales, as heir apparent to the British throne, made up of a coronet, a ring, a rod, a sword, a girdle and a mantle. All but the coronet date from the investiture of Prince Edward (later Edward VIII then Duke of Windsor) in 1911 when most of the Honours of Wales were redesigned.

The present coronet takes the form laid down in a royal warrant issued by Charles II in 1677, which states, "The son and heir apparent of the Crown shall use and bear his coronet of crosses and fleurs-de-lis with one arch and a ball and cross". Within the frame, which is made of gold, is a velvet cap lined with ermine. The present coronet was made for the investiture of Charles, Prince of Wales (later Charles III) in 1969 as the Coronet of George was still in the possession of the Duke of Windsor who was living in exile in France. The defunct coronet and its predecessor the Coronet of Frederick are now a part of the Crown Jewels in the Jewel House at the Tower of London. The original coronets as worn by the Welsh rulers of the Kingdom of Gwynedd and other Welsh principalities have been lost. Llywelyn's coronet was seized by the king of England in 1284 and is known only to history. The fates of the coronets of the rulers of the other princely states, if they ever had them, are not known.

The regalia were on display at the National Museum of Wales from 1974 until 2011 when they were put into storage at St James's Palace, London. The coronet and rod were both put on permanent display in the Jewel House at the Tower of London in 2020.

== See also ==
- Investiture of the Prince of Wales
