= Coat of arms of the Prince of Wales =

Personal coat of arms

Versions
- Escutcheon of the Prince of Wales
- Armiger: William, Prince of Wales
- Crest: The royal crest of England differenced with a label of three points argent but with the coronets those of the heir apparent; gold and ermine mantling
- Shield: The Royal Arms differenced by a label of three points argent overall an inescutcheon quarterly gules and or, four lions passant guardant counterchanged (for the Principality of Wales / Llywelyn the Great ensigned by the coronet of his degree)
- Supporters: A golden lion, wearing the coronet of the Heir apparent, and a silver unicorn, both differenced with a white label of three points
- Motto: German: Ich dien ("I Serve")
- Order: Order of the Garter
- Badge: Prince of Wales's feathers; Welsh dragon with a white label of three points; Crowned escutcheon of the Duchy of Cornwall

The coat of arms of the Prince of Wales is the official personal heraldic insignia of the Princes of Wales, a title traditionally granted to the heir apparent of the reigning monarch of the United Kingdom of Great Britain and Northern Ireland, formerly the Kingdom of Great Britain and before that the Kingdom of England.

The coat of arms devised for Charles III, then Prince of Wales, in 1958, were the same as his granduncle, Edward VIII, had used as prince of Wales since 1911 (see below for references), and contained the badges and elements taken from all four of the constituent countries of the United Kingdom as well as from the many titles the prince holds as heir apparent. These arms lapsed when Charles became king.

Since Edward I awarded it to his son the future Edward II, the heir apparent to the English throne has been created with the title Prince of Wales. William was so created by Charles III on the 2nd day of his reign. The College of Arms has yet to assign William, and Charles III has yet to settle on William by royal warrant, a version of the royal arms that depicts elements of his title as prince of Wales.

The history of the coat of arms is closely linked with those of the coat of arms of England and the coat of arms of the United Kingdom. However, as the noted antiquarian and heraldist Charles Boutell wrote in 1863, "The Arms of the Prince of Wales have a distinct individuality of their own, with which nothing ought to be directly associated".

== Elements typically included ==
=== Coronet ===
The British heir-apparent's coronet as depicted by Hugo Gerard Ströhl

The coronets of the Prince and the Peers of the realm were regulated by Charles II by Royal Warrant, signed on 9 February 1661. Part of the warrant proclaimed: "Our Will and Pleasure therefore is, That the Son and Heir Apparent of the Crown for the time being, shall use and bear his Coronet composed of Crosses and Flower-de-Lized with one Arch; and in the midst a Ball and Cross, as hath our Royal Diadem".

In other words, the heraldic coronet used in the Prince of Wales's coat of arms is similar to the heraldic crown used in the Royal arms, except that instead of two intersecting arches it has only one. Boutell wrote that: "It should be noticed, however, that this coronet belongs to the prince as eldest son of the Sovereign and heir-apparent to the Throne, and not as Prince of Wales". The coronet is also used by the Prince of Wales's consort, in her coat of arms.

The heir's coronet was confirmed in another Royal Warrant signed on 19 November 1917 by George V. The warrant proclaimed: "by the son and heir apparent of the sovereign and his successors a coronet composed of crosses and fleurs-de-lis with one arch and in the midst a ball and cross as in the royal crown."

Currently there are three physical examples of coronets used at one time or other as part of the Honours of the Principality of Wales: the Coronet of Frederick, the Coronet of George and the Coronet of Charles. However, these physical manifestations have not affected the graphical representation of the coronet in heraldic art.

=== Label ===
Beginning with the reign of Edward I, a label of three points Azure (or blue) was used by his son, the future Edward II, to differentiate his arms from those of his father. Without such a label their arms would be identical. Within heraldry this system of differentiating arms is called cadency. The label is placed on the chief (or top) of the shield of arms, with the ends extending across from the dexter to the sinister sides of the shield. It was Edward the Black Prince, heir of Edward III, who first used a label of three points Argent, also white or silver. This has been the label of the heir apparent ever since, without regard to the system of cadency used by other members of the royal family.

=== Crest ===
The Prince of Wales's crest follows closely that of the Sovereign, but always with the appropriate label of difference displayed. This crest depicts a "Lion Or, passant guardant, wearing a coronet of the Heir, and differenced on the shoulders with a label of three points Argent." The lion always stands on a larger coronet of the Heir, which then sits on a golden helmet or the Royal Helm. From the sides flow the gold and ermine mantling of the royal family.

=== Supporters ===
Similarly to the crest, the prince's supporters follow those of the Sovereign. On either side of the shield of arms and standing on gold scrollwork are the royal supporters: the Lion and the Unicorn. Both beasts have the prince's label charged around their necks, again as an appropriate mark of difference. The lion on the dexter side, an ancient symbol of England, is crowned with the coronet of the Heir. The beast has been a supporter of the English royal arms since the reign of Henry VIII. The white unicorn of Scotland on the sinister side was incorporated into the royal arms from the Scottish royal arms after the Union of the crowns in 1603.

=== Order ===
Prince William was appointed a Knight of the Garter in 2008. Since the founding of the Order in 1348, almost every Prince of Wales has been appointed to the Order. The Order of the Garter is represented in the coat of arms by its namesake the blue buckled garter, which bears in gold letters the motto Honi soit qui mal y pense, middle French for "Shame on him who thinks evil of it".

=== Motto ===
Under the coat of arms is a scroll bearing the motto Ich dien, German for "I serve". The motto of uncertain origin first appeared on the arms of Edward of Woodstock ('The Black Prince'). Prince Edward was created Prince of Wales by his father Edward III on 12 May 1343. Legend holds that the Black Prince took the motto as well as the ostrich feathers from John the Blind of Bohemia, who was killed fighting against the prince and his father at the Battle of Crécy in 1346. The motto is also a near homophone for eich dyn (Welsh for 'your man').

=== Badges ===
The Prince of Wales as part of his full achievement of arms has many Heraldic badges, which represent the history and sovereignty of his many titles.

==== Prince of Wales' feathers ====
The Prince of Wales's feathers badge comprises "a plume of three ostrich feathers Argent enfiled by a royal coronet of alternate crosses and fleur-de-lys Or" with the motto Ich dien on a dark blue ribbon. The badge is probably the most recognisable element of the Prince of Wales's heraldic achievement as a personal insignia of the prince and also of the Principality of Wales itself. In a personal capacity the badge is granted as a royal warrant of appointment to companies that regularly supply goods and services to the Prince. As of 2018 there were 170 companies entitled to display this badge with the words "By Appointment to HRH The Prince of Wales" underneath. The badge can be depicted on all premises, delivery vehicles, stationery and advertisements as well as on the individual products themselves. Other organisations associated with Wales or the Prince incorporate the badge into their own insignia including many Welsh regiments of the British Army (such as the Royal Regiment of Wales) and the Welsh Rugby Union.

Feathers used as either a crest or a badge have been an ancient heraldic badge of the House of Plantagenet. However, it was not until its incorporation into the heraldic achievements of the Black Prince that the feathers have become an omnipresent feature of the coats of arms of the Prince of Wales.

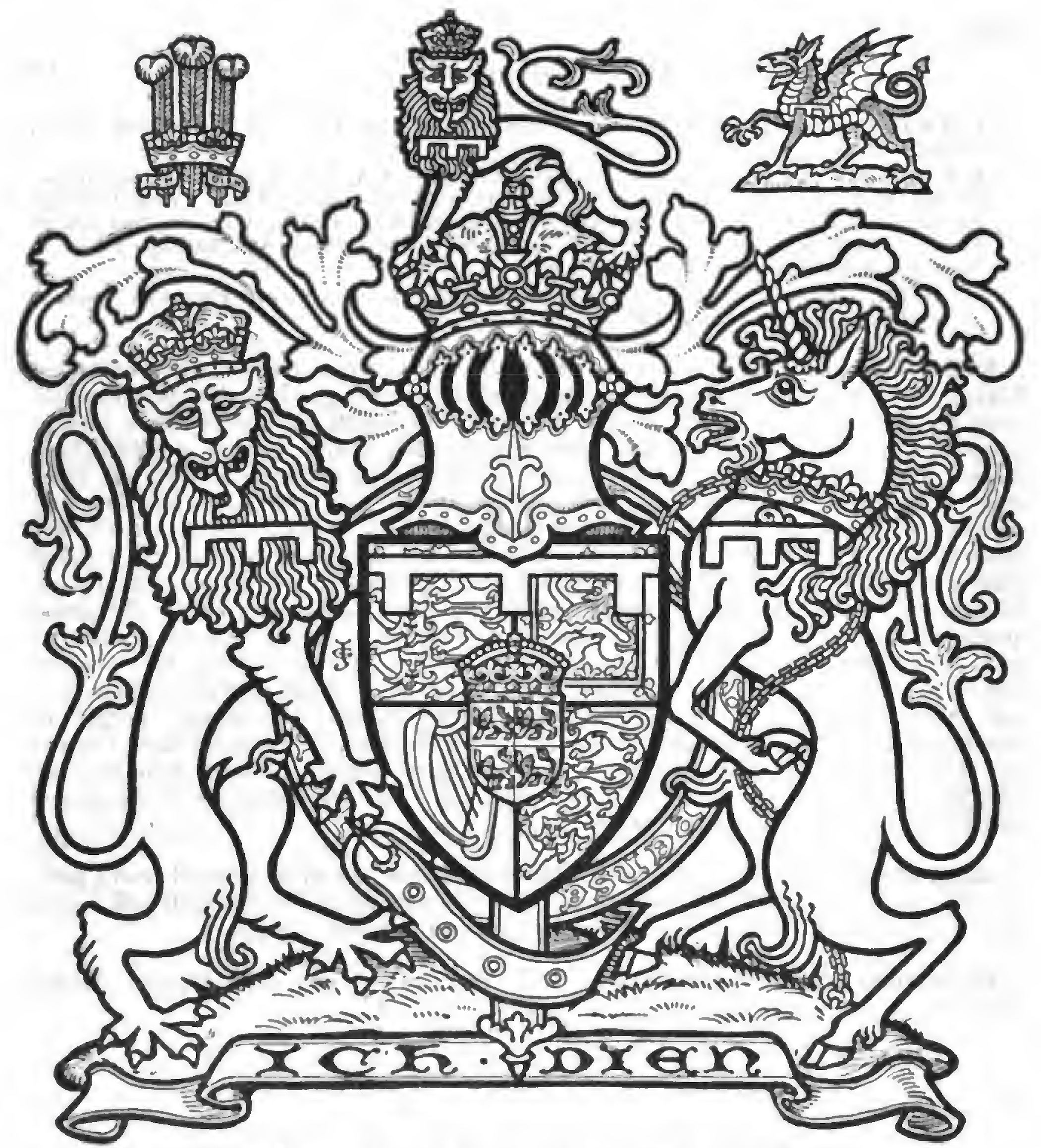
Coat of arms of Edward, Prince of Wales as illustrated in Burke's Peerage 1914 edition

==== Red Dragon of Wales ====
On 10 December 1901 a warrant signed by Edward VII approved the addition of a badge of the Red Dragon to the coat of arms of the Prince of Wales. The proclamation specified "on the sinister side a representation of the Badge of Wales, namely, on a mount vert a Dragon, passant gules, differenced (as in the Crest) with a label of three points argent." This was to complement the feathers badge, which was to be depicted on the dexter side of the prince's crest.

The Red Dragon, or Y Ddraig Goch, has been a symbol associated with Wales since the 7th century. It was not until the beginning of the House of Tudor that the Red Dragon became a royal badge of the kings of England. Henry Tudor (later King Henry VII) displayed the Dragon on his battle standard. The red dragon became an official royal badge of the sovereign (representing Wales) according to a warrant issued in 1801. The warrant at the same time also confirmed the Tudor rose as a royal badge for England, the thistle for Scotland and the golden harp for Ireland.

==== Arms of the Duchy of Cornwall ====
The arms of the Duke of Cornwall are: "Sable, fifteen bezants, five, four, three, two and one." These arms were derived from those of Richard of Cornwall, King of the Romans, son of King John, who was also Count of Poitiers (or Poitou), represented by arms made up of peas (pois) or gold coins.

Upon the accession of the prince's mother as Elizabeth II on 6 February 1952, Prince Charles was automatically made the Duke of Cornwall. As such he was able to display the arms of the duchy on his coat of arms. This title has been granted to every heir apparent since 17 March 1337, in accordance with a charter issued by Edward III for his eldest son and heir Edward of Woodstock. A royal warrant of 21 June 1968 augmented this arms with two supporters "on either side, a Cornish chough proper supporting an ostrich feather Argent, penned Or", and a motto: "Houmont" (or Houmout), meaning courage.

The Prince of Wales's feathers badge

The red Welsh dragon badge with a label of three points

The arms of the Duchy of Cornwall with coronet

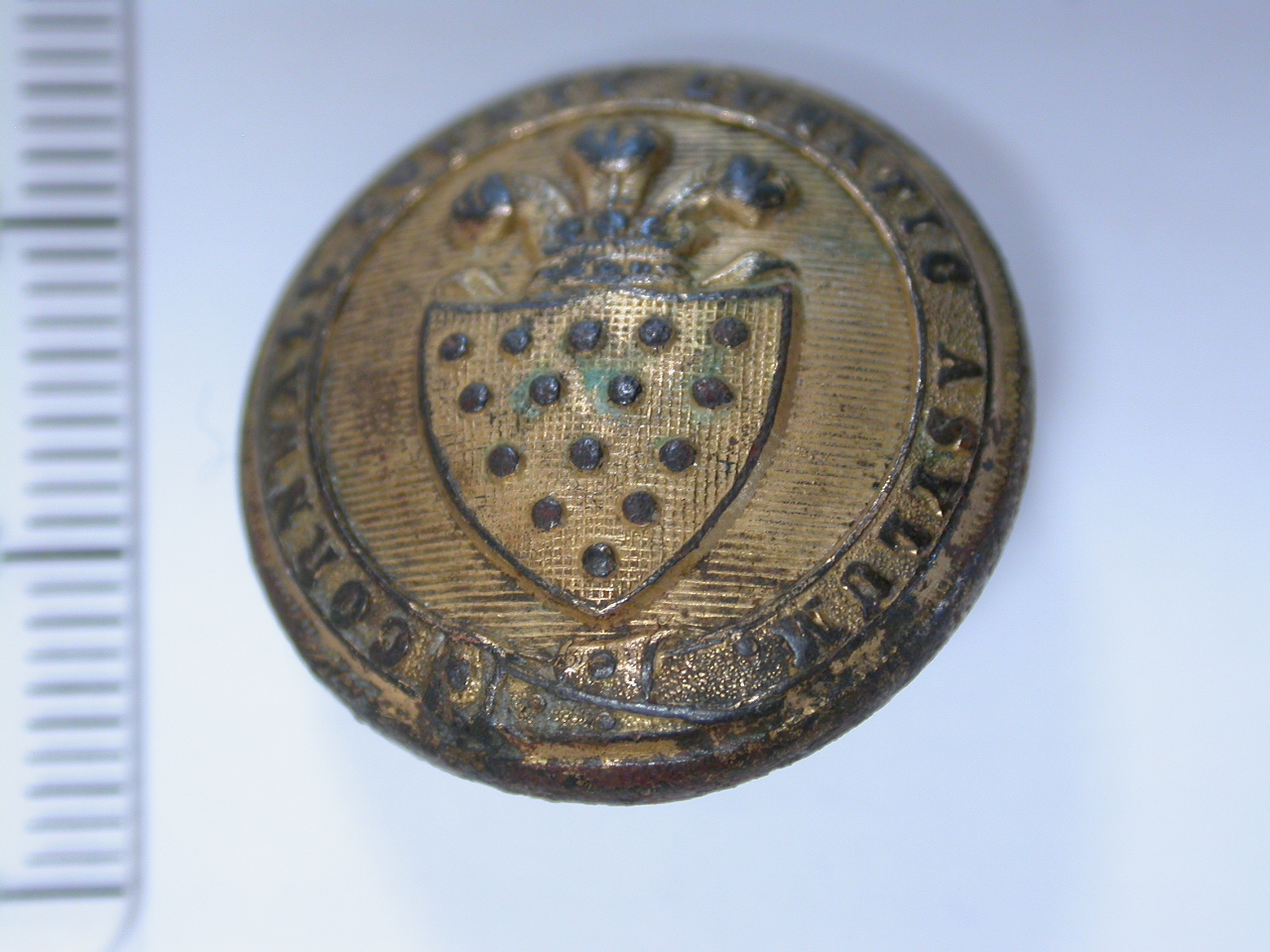
Button from a uniform of Cornwall County Lunatic Asylum (c. 1815–40), showing arms of the duchy, Prince of Wales's feather and the Garter

== Escutcheon ==
=== Independent native Prince of Wales ===
Arms	Dates	Princes	Information
	c. 1240 – 1282	Dafydd ap Llywelyn; Llywelyn ap Gruffydd	The arms of Gwynedd or Llywelyn ap Gruffydd were the arms of the princes of North Wales; the arms are blazoned as: "Quarterly Or and Gules, four lions passant guardant counterchanged."
	c. 1282 – 1283	Dafydd ap Gruffydd	The arms of Dafydd ap Gruffydd were the arms of the last autonomous prince of Wales, before his execution at the hands of Edward I of England in 1283. His arms are the same as those of Llywelyn, but with Azure replacing Gules.
	c. 1363 – 1378 & 1404 – c. 1415	Owain Lawgoch; Owain Glyndŵr	The arms of Owain Lawgoch whilst exiled in France during the mid 14th century, and of Owain Glyndŵr decades later. The banner was adapted from the flag of Gwynedd, and possibly based on those of the houses of Dinefwr and Mathrafal. Blazoned as: "Quarterly or and gules, four lions rampant armed and langued azure counterchanged.".

=== English/British heir apparent ===
Arms	Dates	Princes (later as King)	Information
	1303–1307	Edward of Caernarfon (Edward II)	E portroit, o un bleu label Les armes le bon roi son pere. Or li doint Dieus grace ke il pere Ausi vaillans, e non pas meins; Translated as: "Arms he bore of the good King his father, with a label azure. May God grant him grace and courage to his royal father’s measure!" The quote is from a contemporary poem of the siege of Caerlaverock in 1300. The poem refers to Prince Edward (the future King Edward II), who was born in 1284 at Caernarfon Castle and was then presented to the Welsh chiefs by his father King Edward I as their Prince. However, it was not until seventeen years later that he was presented with the title of Prince of Wales. His arms depicted the arms of the Kingdom of England with a label of three points Azure.
	1343–1377	Edward of Woodstock, the Black Prince; Richard of Bordeaux (Richard II of England)	Shield of Peace The arms of Edward, the Black Prince, were: "Quarterly France ancien (reflecting King Edward III's claim to the French throne) and England with a label of three points Argent". This shield is often called his "Shield for War"; additionally a scroll with the French word Houmout (or Magnanimous) appears above the shield. On his tomb however an additional shield of arms was also displayed, the "Shield for Peace": "Sable, three ostrich feathers, their quills passing through escrolls Argent bearing the words 'Ich Dien'"; the same motto also appears above the shield in another scroll. The future Richard II was granted the shield for war as his arms when he was created Prince of Wales, a few months after the death of his father in 1376.
	1399–1547	Henry of Monmouth (Henry V of England); Edward of Westminster; Edward of the Sanctuary (Edward V); Edward of Middleham; Arthur Tudor; Henry Tudor (Henry VIII); Edward Tudor (Edward VI)	Mirroring the changes in the Royal arms, as brought about by King Henry IV, who changed the 1st and 4th quarter from France ancien to France moderne. This version was first granted to the future Henry V. The arms were then used by various Princes of Wales from both the Houses of Lancaster (Edward of Westminster) and York (the future Edward V and Edward of Middleham). The arms remained unchanged during the Tudor dynasty when the title was granted to Arthur Tudor in 1489. With his death in 1502, the arms were re-granted to his brother, the future Henry VIII, in 1504. The arms were also later granted to the Prince Edward, the future Edward VI.
	1610–1688	Henry Frederick Stuart; Charles Stuart, Duke of York (Charles I of England); Charles Stuart (Charles II of England); James Stuart, Duke of York (James II of England); James Francis Edward Stuart	The Stuart succession brought major changes to arms by incorporating elements of the arms of Scotland and Ireland in the 2nd and 3rd quarters respectively. The arms were first granted to Henry Stuart, the Duke of Rothesay, after his father James VI ascended the throne of England as James I. The arms were then granted twice more to the future Charles I and Charles II. It has been reported that James, the Duke of York (future James II), also bore the arms (despite not holding the title Prince of Wales), but only when his position as heir-presumptive to his brother became secure after the Exclusion crisis. The arms were once more granted to James Francis Edward, who after 1688 became the Jacobite Pretender, whose son Charles Edward (Bonnie Prince Charlie) continued the use of the arms in exile.
	1714–1801	George Augustus (George II of Great Britain); Frederick Louis; George William Frederick (George III); George Augustus Frederick (George IV)	Arms of Hanover with the crown of Charlemagne The House of Hanover inherited the throne of Great Britain after the death of Queen Anne in 1714, which led to the incorporation of the arms of King George I's possessions in Germany into the Royal arms. The blazon for the arms became: "1st quarter England impaling Scotland, 2nd France moderne, 3rd Ireland and 4th the Electorate of Hanover, with a label of three points Argent. The Hanoverian quarter depicted: Brunswick, Lüneburg, Westphalia and an inescutcheon plain Gules, over all three." In the Royal arms the inescutcheon contained a depiction of the Imperial Crown of the Holy Roman Empire, which was an augmentation of honour granted to the Prince-electors of Hanover as Arch-Treasurer to the Holy Roman Emperor. As heir to this Imperial office, only the Prince of Wales was entitled to bear the empty inescutcheon, in right of inheritance of this imperial office as an Electoral Prince.
	1801–1820	George Augustus Frederick (George IV of the United Kingdom)	With the Act of Union of 1800, the arms of the Prince of Wales changed with those of the Kingdom. The ancient claim to France was abandoned, and England occupied the 1st and 4th quarter, while the Hanoverian quarter became an inescutcheon at the centre of the shield. This shield of arms was granted only once to George Augustus Frederick (the future George IV), who also became Prince regent in 1811.
	1841–1910	Albert Edward (Edward VII); George, Duke of York (George V)	The Royal arms were once again altered following the ascension of Queen Victoria to the throne in 1837, when the Hanoverian shield was dropped. The Hanoverian inescutcheon was replaced by the arms of Saxony, which was an heraldic inheritance from the queen's husband Prince Albert of Saxe-Coburg and Gotha (a Duke of Saxony). The inescutcheon only appeared in the arms of Albert's male-line descendants, and not in the Royal arms itself. According to the antiquarian Charles Boutell, the inescutcheon was placed as an "escutcheon of pretence", that "does not appear to be in accordance with either the spirit or the practical usage of true historical Heraldry". These arms were granted twice, first to 'Bertie' (later King Edward VII) and to the future George V. In his 1909 book A Complete Guide to Heraldry, Arthur Charles Fox-Davies writes: "It is much to be regretted that the arms of H.R.H. the Prince of Wales [the future George V] do not include the arms of his sovereignty of the Duchy of Cornwall, nor any allusion to his dignities of Prince of Wales or Earl of Chester."
	1911–present	Edward (Edward VIII); Charles (Charles III); William	In 1911 Prince Edward was invested and presented to the Welsh people as Prince of Wales at Caernarfon Castle, the first time in six hundred years. Welsh local authorities had asked that the red dragon might be introduced into the Royal arms and the coinage, but neither of these wishes was granted. However, King George V issued an order in council that replaced the inescutcheon of Saxony, in the Arms of the Prince of Wales, with an inescutcheon with the arms "representing the Principality of Wales". Blazoned as: "Quarterly Or and Gules four lions passant guardant counterchanged, ensigned by the Coronet of His degree." In 1958 Prince Charles, the Duke of Cornwall, son of Queen Elizabeth II, was granted the same arms when he was made Prince of Wales. In 2022 Prince William, the Duke of Cambridge, son of King Charles III, was granted the arms when he was made Prince of Wales.

== Family ==
=== Consorts ===
The family of the Prince of Wales is entitled to use certain heraldic features. The consort of the Prince of Wales (titled the Princess of Wales) is granted a unique coat of arms upon marriage, based on the impaling of the prince's arms (on the dexter side) and her father's arms (on the sinister side). The consort is also entitled to use the prince's supporters (with the appropriate label) and the use of the prince's coronet over the arms. The current consort, Catherine, the Princess of Wales, was granted a coat of arms upon her marriage to William, Prince of Wales in 2011 (at the time known as the Duke of Cambridge).

Augusta of Saxe-Gotha-Altenburg
(wife of Frederick, 1736–1772)

Alexandra of Denmark
(wife of Albert Edward, 1863–1901)

Mary of Teck
(wife of George, 1901–1910)

Diana Spencer
(wife of Charles,1981–1996)

Camilla Shand
(wife of Charles, 2005–2022)

Catherine Middleton
(wife of William, 2022–present)

== Other arms ==
Coat of arms of the heir apparent to the King of the United Kingdom
(outside Scotland)

Coat of arms of the Duchy of Cornwall
(as augmented 21 June 1968)

Coat of arms of the Duke of Rothesay
(in Scotland)
Arms of the heir apparent to the King of the United Kingdom
(outside Scotland)

Arms of the Duchy of Cornwall

Arms of the Earl of Chester
(in England)

Arms of the Duke of Rothesay
(in Scotland)

Inescutcheon of the Duke of Rothesay
(in Scotland)

Arms of the Earl of Carrick
(in Scotland)

Arms of the Lord of the Isles
(in Scotland)

== See also ==
- Coat of arms of the United Kingdom
- Coat of arms of Scotland
- Royal Badge of Wales
- Prince of Wales
- Duke of Rothesay
- Duke of Cornwall
- Coat of arms of the Prince of Asturias
- Cornish heraldry

== Bibliography ==
- Aveling, S. T. (1890). Heraldry: Ancient and Modern including Boutell's Heraldry. London: Frederick Warne and Co. ISBN 0548122040.
- Boutell, Charles (1863). A Manual of Heraldry, Historical and Popular. London: Windsor And Newton. ISBN 1146289545.
- Brooke-Little, John (1978) [1950]. Boutell's Heraldry (Revised ed.). London: Frederick Warne LTD. ISBN 0-7232-2096-4.
- Fox-Davis, Arthur Charles (1909). A Complete Guide to Heraldry. London, Edinburgh: T.C. & E.C. Jack. ISBN 0543958140.
- Pinches, John Harvey; Pinches, Rosemary (1974). The Royal Heraldry of England. Heraldry Today. Slough, Buckinghamshire: Hollen Street Press. ISBN 0-900455-25-X.
- Scott-Giles, Charles Wilfrid (1967) [1929]. The Romance of Heraldry (Revised ed.). J.M. Dent & Sons. ISBN 0900455284.

== Links ==
- Titles and Heraldry at the Official website of the Prince of Wales
