= Investiture of the prince of Wales =

Ceremony acknowledging a new Prince of Wales

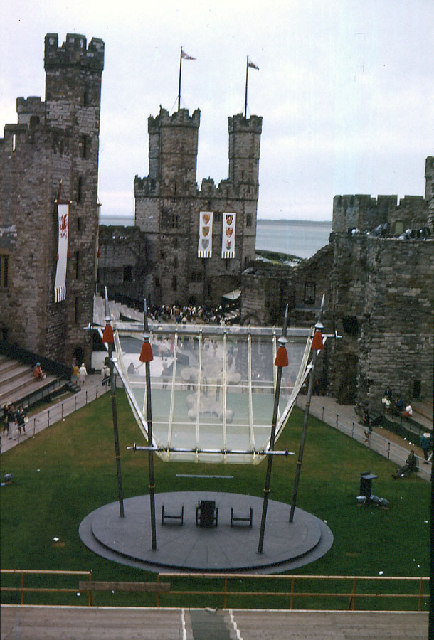
Caernarfon Castle set up for the investiture of Charles III, 1 July 1969

The prince of Wales is sometimes presented and invested with the insignia of his rank and dignity in the manner of a coronation. The title is usually given to the heir apparent of the English or British throne. An investiture is ceremonial, as the title is formally conferred via letters patent issued by the monarch.

The ceremony was last held in 1969 for Queen Elizabeth II's eldest son and heir apparent, who became king on 8 September 2022 as Charles III. His son William, Prince of Wales since 2022, has no plans for an investiture following controversy in Wales regarding the title.

== Native princes of Wales ==
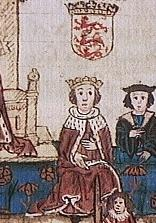
Llywelyn the Last wearing his coronet

It is recorded that Llywelyn ap Gruffudd had deposited his coronet along with his other regalia with the monks at Cymer Abbey for safekeeping at the start of his final campaign in 1282. He was killed later that year. The coronet was seized and presented to King Edward I of England as a token of the complete annihilation of the independent Welsh state.

== English, later British heirs apparent ==
The tradition of investing the heir apparent of the English, and subsequently the British, monarch with the title of "Prince of Wales" began in 1301, when King Edward I, gave the title to his heir apparent, Edward of Caernarvon.

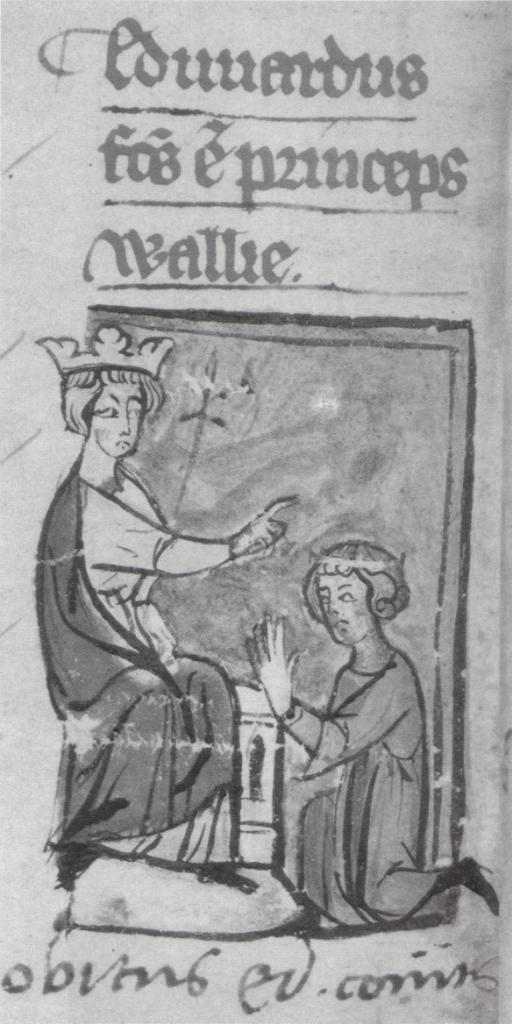
Edward I and Edward II

=== Regalia ===
Frederick, Prince of Wales, later had a coronet made at a cost of £140 5s. in 1728. It is unknown whether Frederick ever wore the coronet himself, but it was used by both his son George III and his grandson George IV when each was Prince of Wales.

Due to its age Frederick's coronet was replaced by the Coronet of George, Prince of Wales, later King George V. At George's own coronation on 22 July 1911, the coronet was worn by his son Edward, the next Prince of Wales. The crown was also worn at the public ceremony of investiture of Edward as Prince of Wales, held at Caernarvon Castle on 13 July 1911.

=== Edward, later Edward VIII ===
Edward was made Prince of Wales on his 16th birthday in 1910, shortly after his father King George V had succeeded to the throne.

George V was persuaded, by the then (Welsh) Chancellor of the Exchequer, David Lloyd George, to revive the investiture ceremony for Edward. The ceremony was reinvented in a grand medieval style and took place at Caernarvon Castle in north Wales. The royal event was designed to celebrate and reintegrate a country that was divided by labour unrest and rebellion at the time.

Edward reigned briefly as King Edward VIII in 1936. When he went into exile following his abdication, he took with him the Coronet of George, Prince of Wales, a highly controversial – and illegal – act. The future King George V, then Prince of Wales, had worn it at his father's coronation in 1902. The traditional coronet being unavailable, and with the older Coronet of Frederick, Prince of Wales, being viewed as unusable due to age, a new Prince of Wales coronet was made to be used for the investiture of Prince Charles as Prince of Wales.

=== Charles, later Charles III ===
Charles, son of Queen Elizabeth II, and later King Charles III, was made Prince of Wales and Earl of Chester by letters patent on 26 July 1958, but the official investiture was not held until 1 July 1969. The ceremony was at Caernarvon Castle. Taught at University College of Wales, Aberystwyth by the lecturer and Welsh-nationalist politician Edward Millward, Prince Charles spent ten weeks leading up to his investiture learning about Welsh culture, history and language, and during the ceremony he gave his replies in both English and Welsh. He gave his address in Welsh.

I, Charles, Prince of Wales, do become your liege man of life and limb and of earthly worship, and faith and truth I will bear unto thee, to live and die against all manner of folks.

On the evening of 28 June 2009—to commemorate the 40th anniversary of the investiture—BBC Parliament broadcast a repeat of the original BBC TV colour outside broadcast from 1 July 1969, fronted by Cliff Michelmore and Richard Baker. This was preceded by an interview with Prince Charles recorded a few days before his investiture. The BBC repeated the broadcast on 1 July 2019, to mark the 50th anniversary.

=== William ===
William, son of King Charles III, was made Prince of Wales on 9 September 2022. There are no plans for a formal investiture, with an emphasis instead on "deepening the trust and respect of the people of Wales." Charles reportedly did not want to 'put William through' what he went through during his own investiture in 1969.

== Opposition to investitures ==
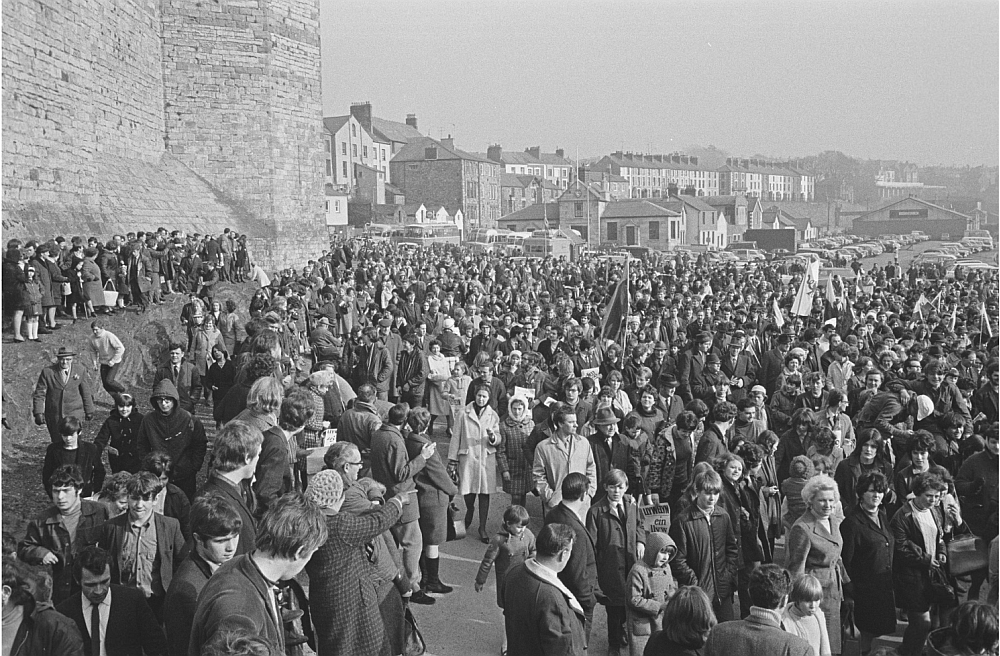
A protest against the holding of the investiture in Caernarfon took place in March 1969

The protests leading up to the investiture of Charles as Prince of Wales were described as the "anti-investiture movement". A number of organisations and individuals in Wales were against the investiture including Dafydd Iwan, Edward Millward, Cofia 1282 ("remember 1282") and the Welsh Language Society. For a minority of people, the investiture itself was controversial and led to widespread protests. On the day of the investiture, a few nonviolent protesters were arrested.

Since the investiture of Charles, further notable organisations and figures in Wales have called for an end to the title including Plaid Cymru (which has since changed its stance), Republic, Michael Sheen, Dafydd Elis-Thomas, Leanne Wood, and Bethan Sayed.

On 9 September 2022 Prince William was announced as Prince of Wales by King Charles III. By 12 September, a petition calling to end the use of the title had received nearly 20,000 signatures.

== Opinion polls ==
A BBC Wales poll in 1999 found that 73 per cent of Welsh speakers wanted the position of Prince of Wales to continue.

A BBC poll in 2009, marking the 40th anniversary of the investiture, showed that 58 per cent of the Welsh population was in favour of a similar public ceremony for Prince William after the accession of Charles to the throne.

A poll in July 2018 again found 57% of Welsh people in support of the title passing on after the accession of Charles to the throne, with 27% opposed. Support for a similar investiture was less, with 31% supporting, 27% opposed and 18% wanting a different kind of investiture.

=== Opinion polls on the investiture of the Prince of Wales in Wales ===
==== Type of investiture ====
Date(s) conducted	Polling organisation & client	Similar investiture to 1969	Different investiture to 1969	Oppose	Undecided
20–22 September 2022	YouGov / Barn Cymru	19%	30%	34%	17%
2019	ICM / BBC Wales	41%	20%	30%	9%
2018	YouGov / ITV Wales	31%	18%	27%	24%

==== Investiture support ====
Date(s) conducted	Polling organisation & client	Support	Oppose	Undecided	Lead (Note: Lead for some polls is calculated by the sum of both support for a similar and support for a different-style investiture in the absence of a total support figure.)	Note
2021	Beaufort Research / Western Mail	61%	26%	13%	35%	“When Prince Charles becomes King, would you like to see Prince William made the Prince of Wales at a public ceremony known as an investiture?”
12–24 June 2009	BBC	58%	30%	–	28%	Non-standard oppose option: "not in favour of there being another public investiture ceremony similar to the type Prince Charles received at Caernarfon in 1969"
1999	Beaufort Research / BBC Wales	72%	–	–	–	Non-standard: Welsh speakers only asked

== Bibliography ==
- Mears, Kenneth J.; Thurley, Simon; Murphy, Claire (1994). The Crown Jewels. Historic Royal Palaces. ASIN B000HHY1ZQ.
