= Louis Osman =

English artist, architect, goldsmith, silversmith and medallist (1914-1996)

- Born: 1914
- Died: 1996 (aged 81–82)
- Occupations: Artist, architect, goldsmith, silversmith and medallist

Louis Osman (30 January 1914 – 11 April 1996) was an English artist, architect, goldsmith, silversmith and medallist. He is notable for the gold coronet he designed and made for the investiture in 1969 of Charles, Prince of Wales. His work as a goldsmith puts him among the top artists in his field, with his valuable and important works held in church, civic and private collections worldwide.

== Early life ==
He was the son of Charles Osman of Exeter, Devon. He was educated at Hele's School in Exeter. In the 1930s he attended the Bartlett School of Architecture, part of University College London, 1931, and also the Slade School of Art. He was a Donaldson Medallist of RIBA in 1935. The winner of this medal is selected by the Bartlett School of Architecture to the student who graduates top of the class at Part I.

== War service ==
During the Second World War he was a Major in the Intelligence Corps serving with the Combined Operations Headquarters and Special Air Service as a specialist in Air Photography. He also served on the Beach Reconnaissance Committee prior to Normandy landings on 6 June 1944.

== Career ==
In the late 1930s he took part in the British Museum and British School of Archæology expeditions to Syria. He also designed private and public buildings.

After war service he worked in London designing buildings, furniture, tapestries, and glass including work in Westminster Abbey, Lincoln, Ely, Exeter and Lichfield Cathedrals. He also did work for the National Trust at Staunton Harold Church in Ashby de la Zouch.

During the 1970s he and his wife lived at Canons Ashby House in Northamptonshire. Whilst there, he made the crown, with his enamelist wife, which was used at the investiture of Charles, Prince of Wales. In 1976, they also made the gold enamelled casket holding Magna Carta on view in the United States Capitol, Washington, DC for the United States Bicentennial.

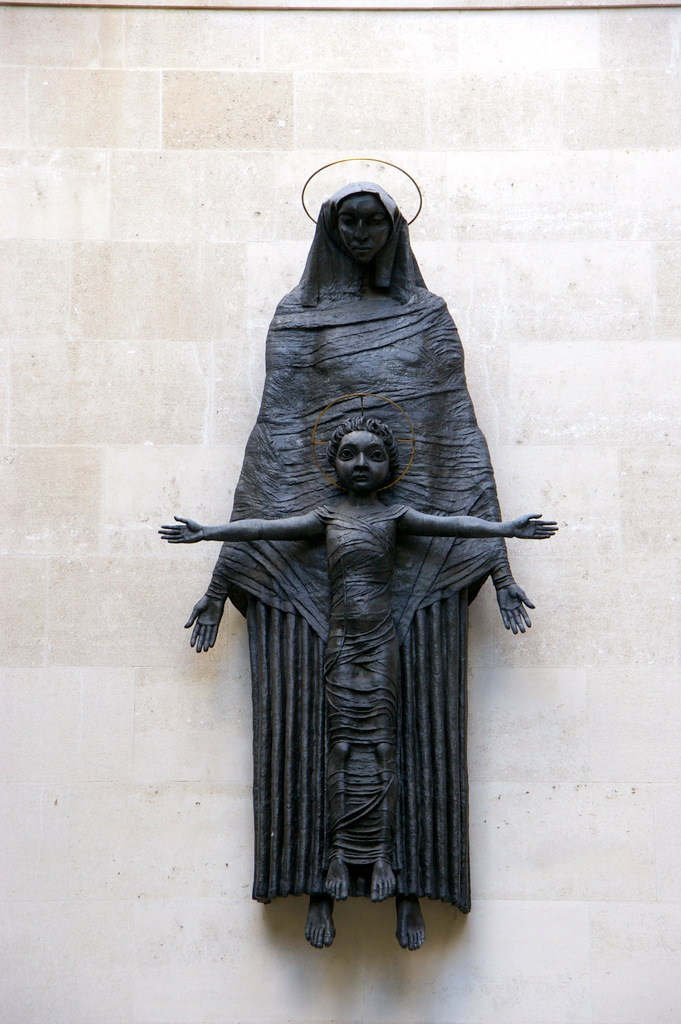
Epstein statue of Madonna and Child at nos. 11–14 Cavendish Square, London, restored by Osman

== Personal life ==
In 1940 he married Dilys Roberts of Rotherfield, East Sussex and they had one daughter.

== Selected works ==
Architecture

- The Old Court at Winterbrook House, Wallingford, for Agatha Christie and Max Mallowan, with whom he was in Syria (1939)
- Cavendish Square, London. Restoration and improvements to numbers 11–14 following bomb damage, a Convent and installation of Epstein's Madonna and Child statue. (1950)
- Newnham College, Cambridge, Principal's Lodging, with sculptures by Geoffrey Clarke and designed like a tiny Italian Renaissance palazzo. (1958)
- Restoration of the Georgian garden 'Birdcage' arbour at Melbourne Hall. (1958)
- Ranston House, Dorset – almost total rebuild of a Georgian mansion. (1961–63)
- Staunton Harold Church now owned by the National Trust.
- A staircase 5 ft wide in green oak for Lady Hollenden in Gloucestershire. (1985)

Unexecuted architectural works

- Design for rebuilding of St John's Smith Square as a concert hall with a ceiling by Picasso.
- St Edmund Hall, Oxford a tall cantilevered tower.

Ecclesiastical

- Shere Church 14th century glass and chancel fittings renewed in 1956, together with altar frontals and altar cross and candlesticks.
- Lincoln Cathedral - treasury (1960)
- Ely Cathedral – a new high altar cross with central crucifix by Graham Sutherland now in the Dallas Museum. (1964)
- Exeter Cathedral – a new high altar cross, now in St Gabriel's Chapel

Gold and silver working

- A very heavy cast silver wine mug for Sir Henry Tizard to use at Goldsmiths' Hall. (1958)
- Coronet of Charles, Prince of Wales (1969)
- A lectern for the Victoria and Albert Museum (1976).
- Donald Reid Medal for the London School of Hygiene and Tropical Medicine.
- 1971 Gold Exhibition at Goldsmiths' Hall with 105 exhibits by Osman.
- 1974 Exhibition of 131 pieces at Canons Ashby.

== See also ==
- Ken Major
