= The Silver Trust =

UK charity

The Silver Trust is a registered UK charitable foundation . Its initial aim was to provide 10 Downing Street, residence of the British Prime Minister, with a collection of contemporary silver. The Trust was established in 1987 by Rupert Hambro, Lady Falkender, Lady Henderson and Jean Muir. The Trust helps encourage and publicise the work of practising British silversmiths; silver commissioned and owned by the trust is made available on loan for use in British government buildings and embassies overseas.

The Trust's earliest commissioned work (1987) was a cruet set by Malcolm Appleby. In 1991 a large donation from an anonymous benefactor allowed the Trust to commission a sizeable collection. By 1993 a sufficient amount of silverwork had been made and was presented to Prime Minister John Major, to be used for government and state occasions. During the summer Parliamentary recess the Trust started a series of exhibitions; the venue alternates yearly between the United Kingdom and a destination abroad. These exhibitions have helped the Silver Trust become more widely known and also helped gain commissions for many of the silversmiths represented in the collection. The Trust also uses the exhibitions to show new pieces that have been commissioned into the Silver Trust National Collection.
