= Malcolm Appleby =

Scottish engraver (born 1946)

Malcolm Appleby MBE
- Born: 1946 (age 79–80); West Wickham, England
- Education: Beckenham School of Art, Ravensbourne College of Art, Central School of Arts and Crafts, Sir John Cass School of Art, Royal College of Art
- Known for: Engraving
- Notable work: Monde of the Coronet of Charles, Prince of Wales; 500th anniversary silver cup for the London Assay Office; Raven gun for the Royal Armouries; Silver teapot and gold beaded silver bowl for the Art Gallery of Western Australia
- Awards: Honorary D.Litt. from Heriot-Watt University (2000), Member of the Order of the British Empire (MBE) (2014)

Malcolm Appleby MBE (born 1946 in West Wickham) is a Scottish engraver. His public and private commissions include: the monde (orb) of the Coronet of Charles, Prince of Wales (1969); a 500th anniversary silver cup for the London Assay Office (1978); a raven gun for the Royal Armouries (1986); a cruet set for 10 Downing Street, commissioned by The Silver Trust (1988); a sculptural tablepiece for Bute House, Edinburgh, the residence of the First Minister for Scotland (1999); a silver teapot and gold beaded silver bowl for the Art Gallery of Western Australia in Perth, Australia (2000); and the Royal and Gannochy Trust Medals awarded by the Royal Society of Edinburgh (2000, 2003).

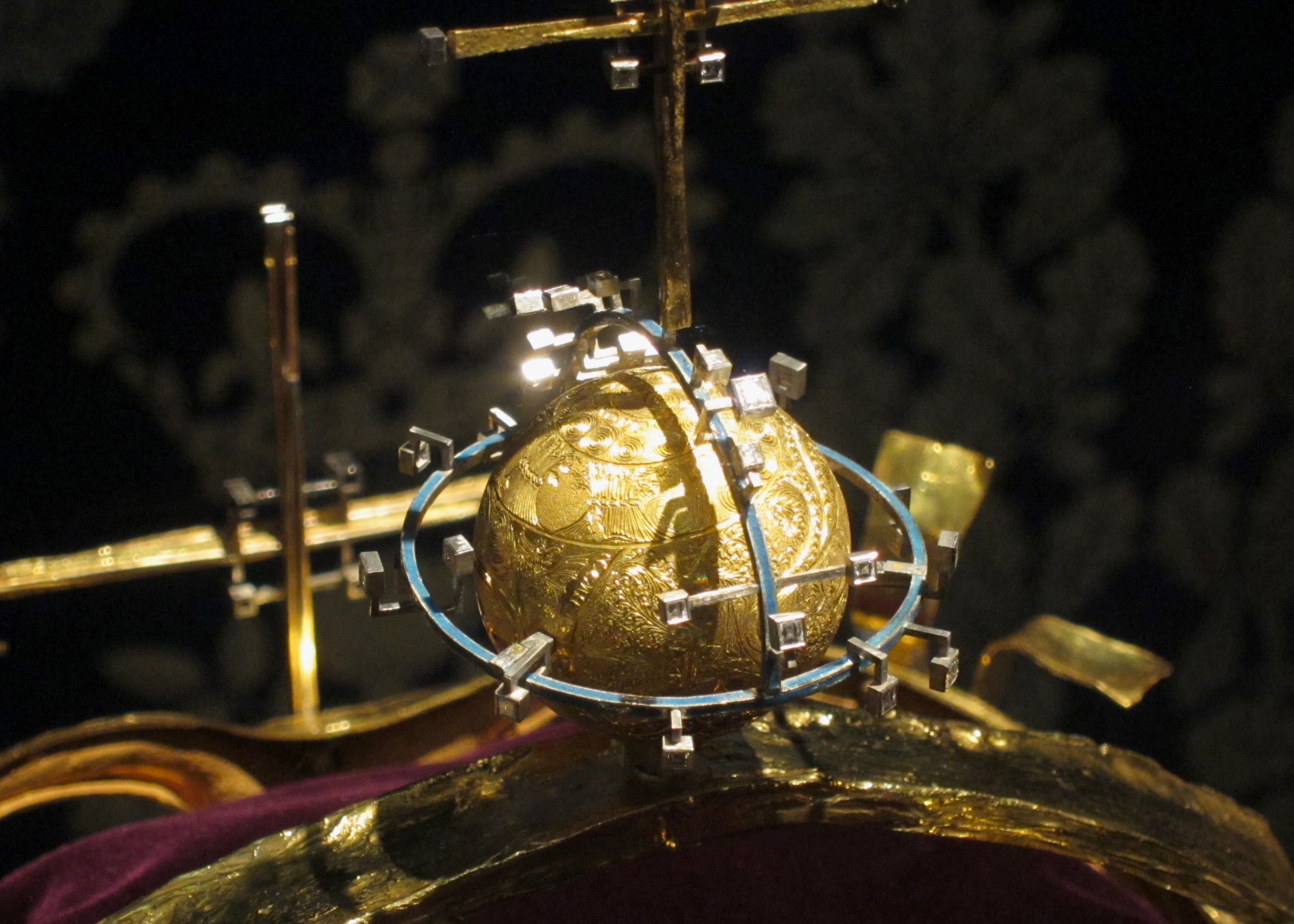
Monde on the Coronet of Charles, Prince of Wales

Appleby trained at Beckenham School of Art, Ravensbourne College of Art, Central School of Arts and Crafts, Sir John Cass School of Art and the Royal College of Art. He was a Littledale Scholar at the Worshipful Company of Goldsmiths in 1969. He has lived in Scotland for most of his working life, and currently maintains an atelier at Grandtully near Aberfeldy, Perthshire. He received an honorary D.Litt. from Heriot-Watt University in 2000 and was appointed Member of the Order of the British Empire (MBE) in the 2014 Birthday Honours for services to hand engraving.
