= Coronet of Charles, Prince of Wales =

Small crown, made 1969

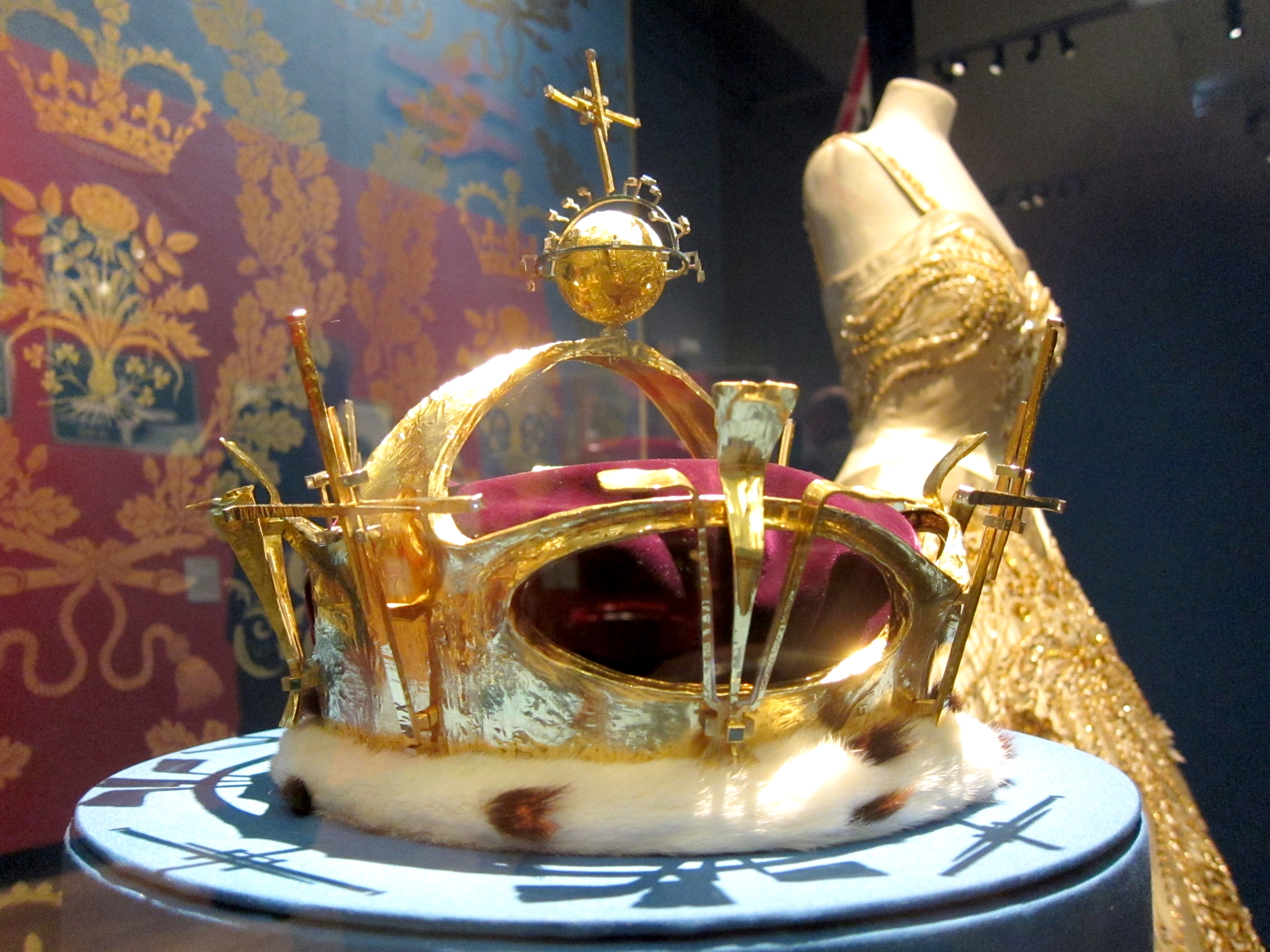
- On display at the Victoria & Albert Museum, 2012

Details
- Country: United Kingdom
- Made: 1969
- Weight: 1.36 kg (3 lb)
- Arches: 1
- Material: Gold, platinum
- Cap: Velvet trimmed with ermine
- Notable stones: 75 diamonds and 12 emeralds
- Other elements: a gold-plated ping-pong ball (used as monde)

The Coronet of Charles, Prince of Wales is a small crown that is part of the Honours of Wales. The gold coronet, with diamonds set in platinum, was made for and used by King Charles III at his investiture as Prince of Wales in 1969. Designed by the artist Louis Osman, the coronet was a gift from the Worshipful Company of Goldsmiths to the Prince's mother, Queen Elizabeth II. It has been described as modern but its form is traditional. The coronet is on permanent display in the Jewel House at the Tower of London.

== Background ==
When the former King Edward VIII went into exile as the Duke of Windsor in 1936 following his abdication, he took with him the Coronet of George, Prince of Wales – a highly controversial act. This coronet had been specially created for George V, when Prince of Wales, and he wore it at his father's coronation in 1902. George's son, Edward, when Prince of Wales, wore it at the coronation of his father in 1911. In 1969, it was judged impractical to charge the ex-king with effectively stealing the coronet, which would be returned to the United Kingdom after his death in 1972.

Since the 1902 coronet was unavailable, and the Coronet of Frederick, Prince of Wales, was judged unusable due to its age, a new coronet had to be made for the investiture of Charles as Prince of Wales. He had been created Prince of Wales in July 1958 when he was nine years old, but the formal investiture ceremony was held a few months before his 21st birthday. Today, the coronets of Frederick and George are part of the Crown Jewels of the United Kingdom on display at the Tower of London.

== Design ==
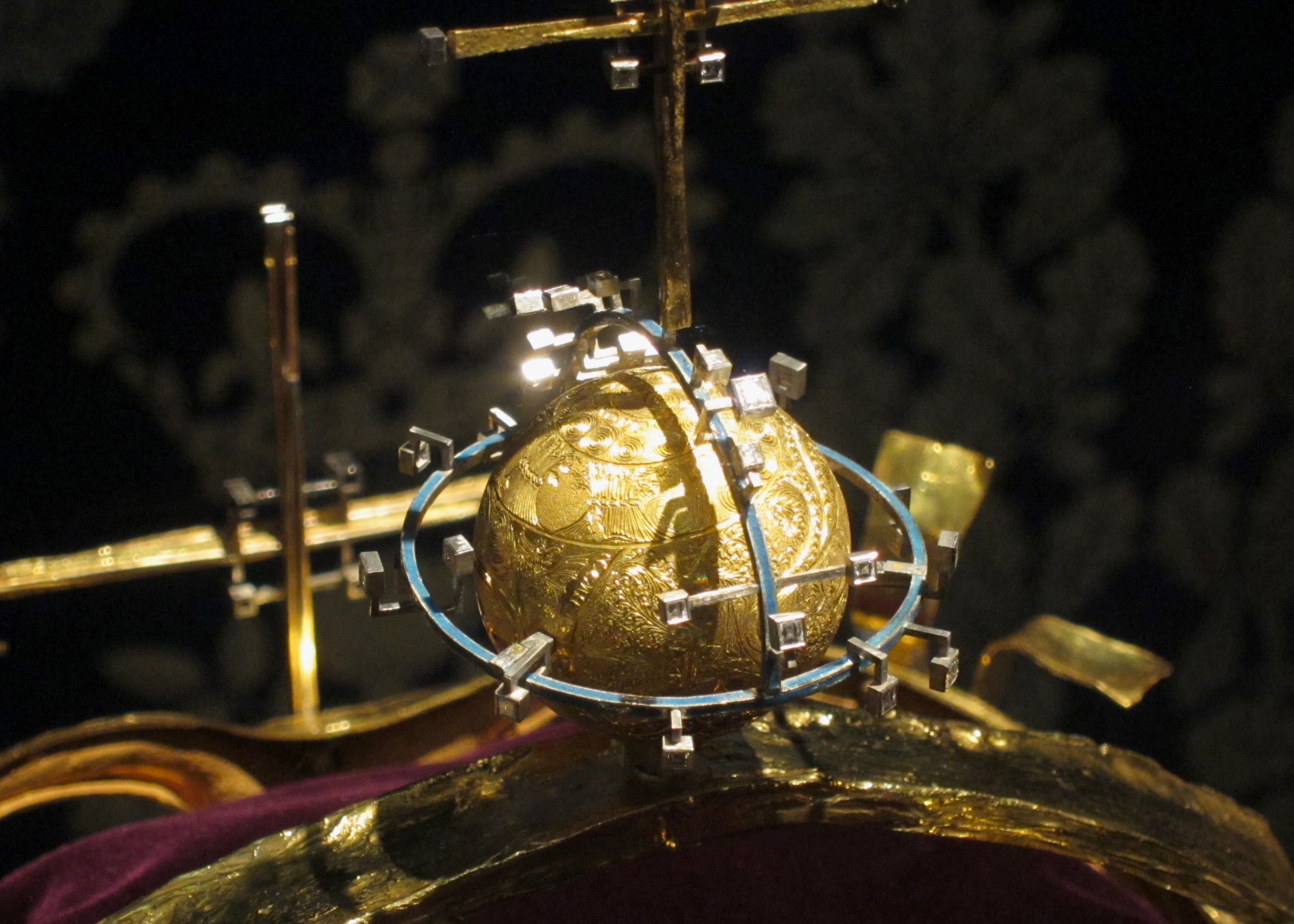
Close-up of the monde

The coronet follows the form laid down by Charles II in 1677 by having just one arch rather than the traditional two arches or four half-arches of British monarchs' crowns to show that the Prince of Wales is inferior to the monarch but outranks the other royal princes and dukes. Though based on this traditional design, the coronet has a futurist look that was popular in the 1960s, and it was created by the eccentric designer Louis Osman.

In the centre of the arch is a monde (which is actually a gold-plated ping-pong ball) engraved with the Prince of Wales's insignia by Malcolm Appleby, surmounted by a plain cross. Orbiting the monde are thirteen square diamonds set in platinum arranged as the constellation of Scorpio – the Prince of Wales's star sign. Within the 24-carat textured gold base is a purple velvet cap lined with ermine. Around the base are four crosses and four abstract fleurs-de-lis in 22-carat gold (mined in the Mawddach Valley in Merionethshire, it was the last Welsh gold held in stock by Johnson Matthey) sparsely decorated with diamonds and emeralds. The diamonds on the base represent the seven deadly sins and the seven gifts of the Holy Spirit. In total, the coronet has 75 diamonds and 12 emeralds – white and green being the national colours of Wales – and weighs 1.36 kilograms (3 lb). It measures 26.5 centimetres (10.4 in) tall and 28.8 centimetres (11.3 in) in diameter at the widest point.

When Osman unveiled the coronet in London, he described it as "something that is modern".

== Manufacture ==
The frame was made by electroplating gold onto the inside of an epoxy resin cast. B. J. S. Electroplating Co., a precious-metal electroformer's, was commissioned by the Worshipful Company of Goldsmiths to make a fibreglass-reinforced polyester mould of a wax model of the coronet that Louis Osman had made using a wooden template. From this mould a negative epoxy resin cast was produced. B. J. S. involved Engelhard Industries to assist in the electroforming of the cast. David Mason was Head of Research at Engelhard and was assigned the task of doing the electroforming at the company's headquarters in the Forest of Dean. Until then, electroforming an object of that size had never been attempted anywhere in the world, and it was the first crown to be made in this way.

== Usage ==
The Worshipful Company of Goldsmiths presented the coronet to Queen Elizabeth II for the investiture, which was held at Caernarfon Castle on 1 July 1969.

Coronets of Princes of Wales have been rarely used. The Coronet of Frederick, Prince of Wales was never actually worn by Frederick; and the Coronet of George, Prince of Wales was only worn rarely by George, later George V, and by Edward, later Edward VIII. Charles, later Charles III, did not wear his coronet except at his investiture; the coronet was carried before him when he took his seat in the House of Lords in 1970.

The coronet was loaned to the National Museum and Gallery of Wales in Cardiff by Queen Elizabeth II in 1974. It was placed into storage at St James's Palace, London in 2011. The coronet and rod were both put on permanent display in the Jewel House at the Tower of London in 2020.

== See also ==
- Elizabeth II's jewels § 1937 coronets
