= Investiture of Charles, Prince of Wales =

1969 royal ceremony in Caernarfon, Wales

Queen Elizabeth II and Prince Charles (later Charles III) on the balcony of Caernarfon Castle following the investiture. The Prince of Wales is adorned with a coronet, sceptre, and robe.

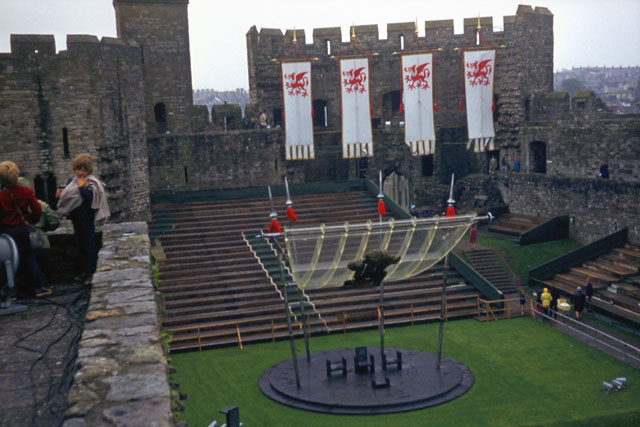
The setting for the 1969 investiture ceremony in Caernarfon Castle

The public investiture of Charles, Prince of Wales (later King Charles III) took place at Caernarfon Castle on 1 July 1969. The ceremony formally presented the title of Prince of Wales to the 20-year-old Charles, eldest son of Queen Elizabeth II. He was the 21st heir to the English or British throne to hold the title. The investiture was a revival of a ceremony which had first been used for the previous prince of Wales, Edward (Charles's great-uncle), in 1911. The 1969 event was watched by 500 million people worldwide on television, but it received some opposition in particular from Welsh nationalist organisations.

== Background ==
The title Prince of Wales is one that has traditionally been bestowed to the male heir apparent of the English or British monarch, since Edward I gave his son Edward of Caernarfon the title in 1284. The bestowal is not automatic, however, nor hereditary. Edward had been born in Caernarfon Castle in 1284, possibly a deliberate statement by Edward I to the recently conquered Welsh. The Prince of Wales title came with the royal lands in Wales, as well as the title Earl of Chester. The Prince of Wales spent five weeks in Caernarfon in 1301 but would never return again.

After rising against the English, native Welshman Owain Glyndwr proclaimed himself Prince of Wales in 1400 but, since his defeat in 1409, the title has reverted to a ceremonial one, given to heirs of the English throne.

Queen Elizabeth II made her eldest son, Charles, Prince of Wales and Earl of Chester by letters patent on 26 July 1958 when he was only nine years old. He was the 21st to be given the title. Elizabeth's uncle Edward, the future King Edward VIII, had been the previous Prince of Wales and had been invested in the title at Caernarfon Castle in 1911 before becoming King in 1936. The 1911 ceremony was a new invention, though using medieval symbolism, which would be repeated by Charles's investiture in 1969.

The investiture was preceded by a year-long promotional campaign called "Croeso '69" (Welcome '69) designed to raise the profile of Wales and promote tourism. The UK's Labour government had ambitions to modernise Britain, including Wales where old industries were being replaced by new businesses and technology.

The 1911 gold coronet, having gone missing, needed to be replaced in 1969, though by one with a modern design. After the death of the Duke of Windsor – the former Edward VIII – in 1972, the old coronet was found in his possessions.

Ten days prior to the investiture, a documentary co-produced by the BBC and ITV called Royal Family was broadcast, showing the royals going about their everyday lives. It raised the royal family to the forefront of the public eye.

== Event ==
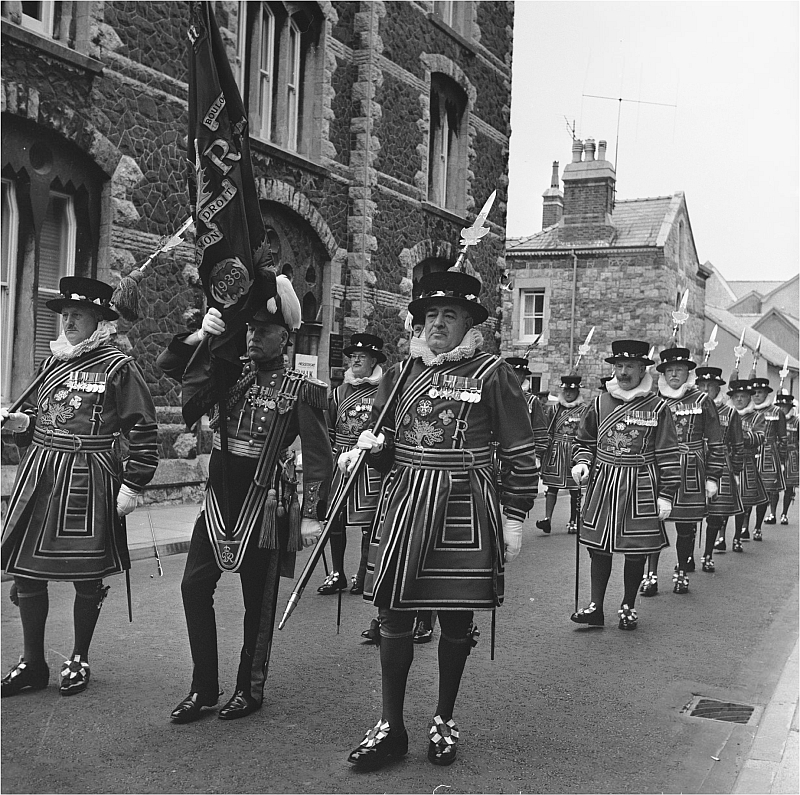
Parade through the streets of Caernarfon

Charles was formally invested with the title Prince of Wales at a ceremony at Caernarfon Castle on 1 July 1969. The event was organised by a specially established Investiture Committee, chaired by the earl marshal, Bernard Fitzalan-Howard, 16th Duke of Norfolk. With a growing national consciousness rising in Wales at the time, the investiture needed to celebrate both the pride in Wales and the current British monarchy.

Charles's uncle Lord Snowdon, being a professional photographer, arranged the ceremony to be television-friendly. The ceremony took place on a circular slate dais shielded by a large modern canopy of perspex which allowed the audience and television cameras to watch the proceedings.

Prior to the investiture, Charles spent nine weeks at Aberystwyth University learning to speak the Welsh language, taught by Welsh nationalist Tedi Millward. Charles consequently was able to give a speech at the investiture, in Welsh and English, where he pledged "to associate [himself] in word and deed with as much of the life of the Principality as possible".

For an hour prior to the arrival of the royal family, a procession of dignitaries and guests paraded through the town and entered the castle through the Water Gate, led by the king's heralds with a guard of honour of the Welsh Guards. Several dozen teenagers followed, representatives of Welsh youth. Then came the invited members of the House of Lords, the members and aldermen of Caernarvon Borough Council, members of the Gorsedd and the National Eisteddfod Court, chairmen of the 13 Welsh county councils, county sheriffs and the Welsh MPs. Church representatives arrived, then the prime minister, Harold Wilson, and his wife, Mary; the home secretary, James Callaghan; and the chiefs of staff of the armed forces.

Members of the royal family arrived in a fleet of four cars, led by the lord lieutenant of Caernarvonshire. Finally Charles arrived in an open carriage accompanied by his equerry, David Checketts, and the secretary of state for Wales, George Thomas, to a rendition of God Bless the Prince of Wales by the Band of the Welsh Guards.

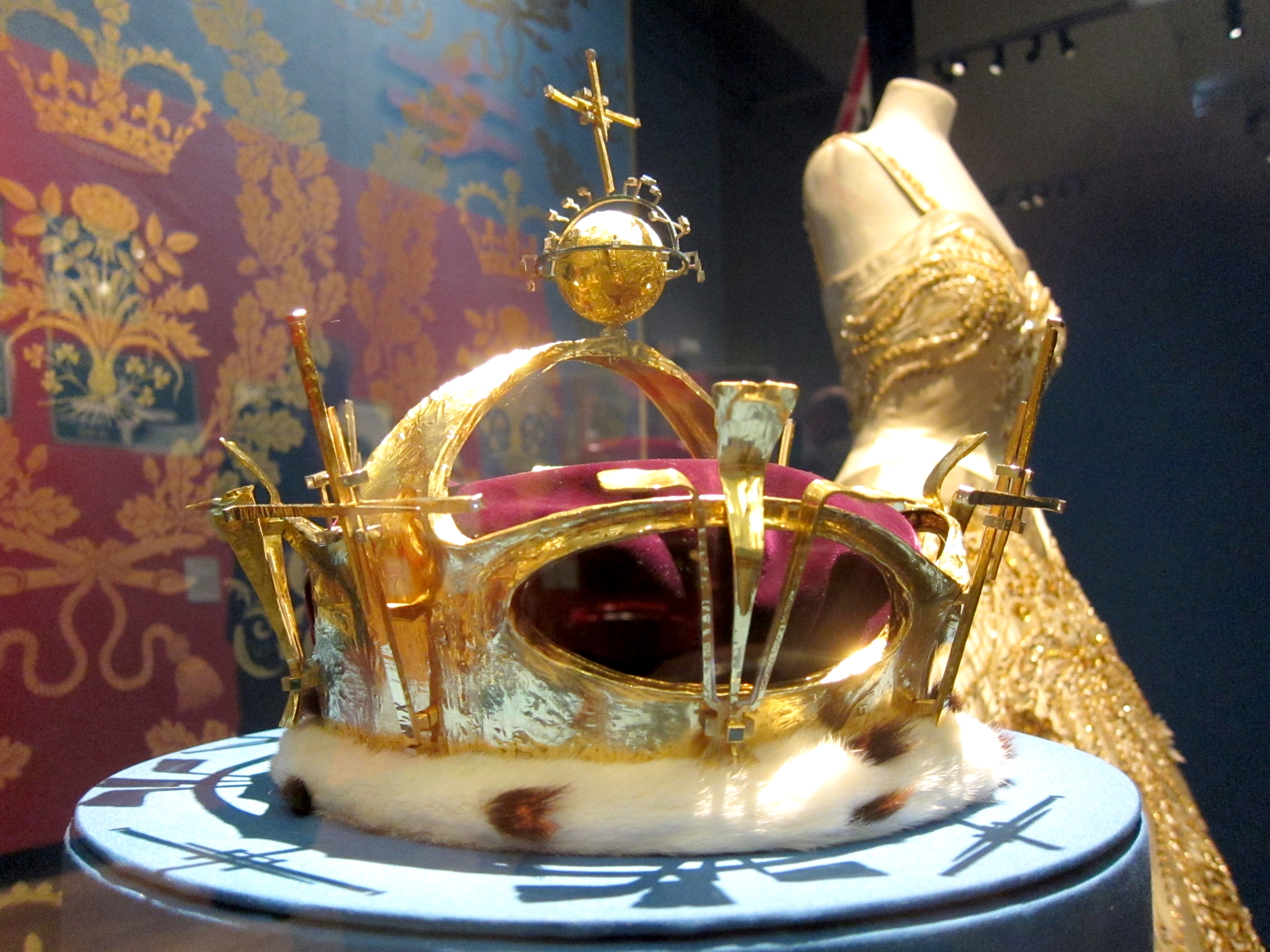
The coronet made for the investiture

In front of the invited audience of 4,000 people inside the castle, Charles came to the stage and knelt on a scarlet cushion. The secretary of state for Wales read the Letters Patent in Welsh as the Queen gave Charles a golden rod, a mantle, a sword, a girdle, the new coronet and a ring. The prince then took an oath, announcing:

I, Charles, Prince of Wales, do become your liege man of life and limb and of earthly worship and faith and truth I will bear unto thee to live and die against all manner of folks.

The prince kissed his mother on the cheek before being led by the Queen to the balcony of the Queen's Gate to greet the crowds waiting outside the castle. He later sat himself on a throne, between two further thrones occupied by the Queen to one side and his father, the Duke of Edinburgh, sitting to the other side.

The ceremony was broadcast live on BBC television, in black and white on BBC1 and in colour on BBC2, from 10:30 am until 4:30 pm. It was also broadcast on BBC Radio 3 and bilingually on BBC Radio 4 Wales. It had an audience of 19 million in the UK and 500 million worldwide. It was also televised on the commercial channel ITV, who started coverage from 12.00 noon. Though 250,000 visitors were predicted for Caernarfon, only about 90,000 visited the town to see the event for themselves. It was believed many people chose to watch the ceremony at home on television instead.

Following the event, Charles spent four days touring Wales by car, helicopter and the royal yacht. Leaving the royal yacht in Llandudno the day after the investiture (and rejoining the yacht at various points on the trip), the Prince visited Newtown, New Quay, St Davids, Gelli Aur, Llanelli, Swansea, Merthyr Tydfil (Cyfarthfa Castle), Newport and Cardiff. He ended the tour with a presentation at the City Hall and a concert at the New Theatre.

== Opposition ==
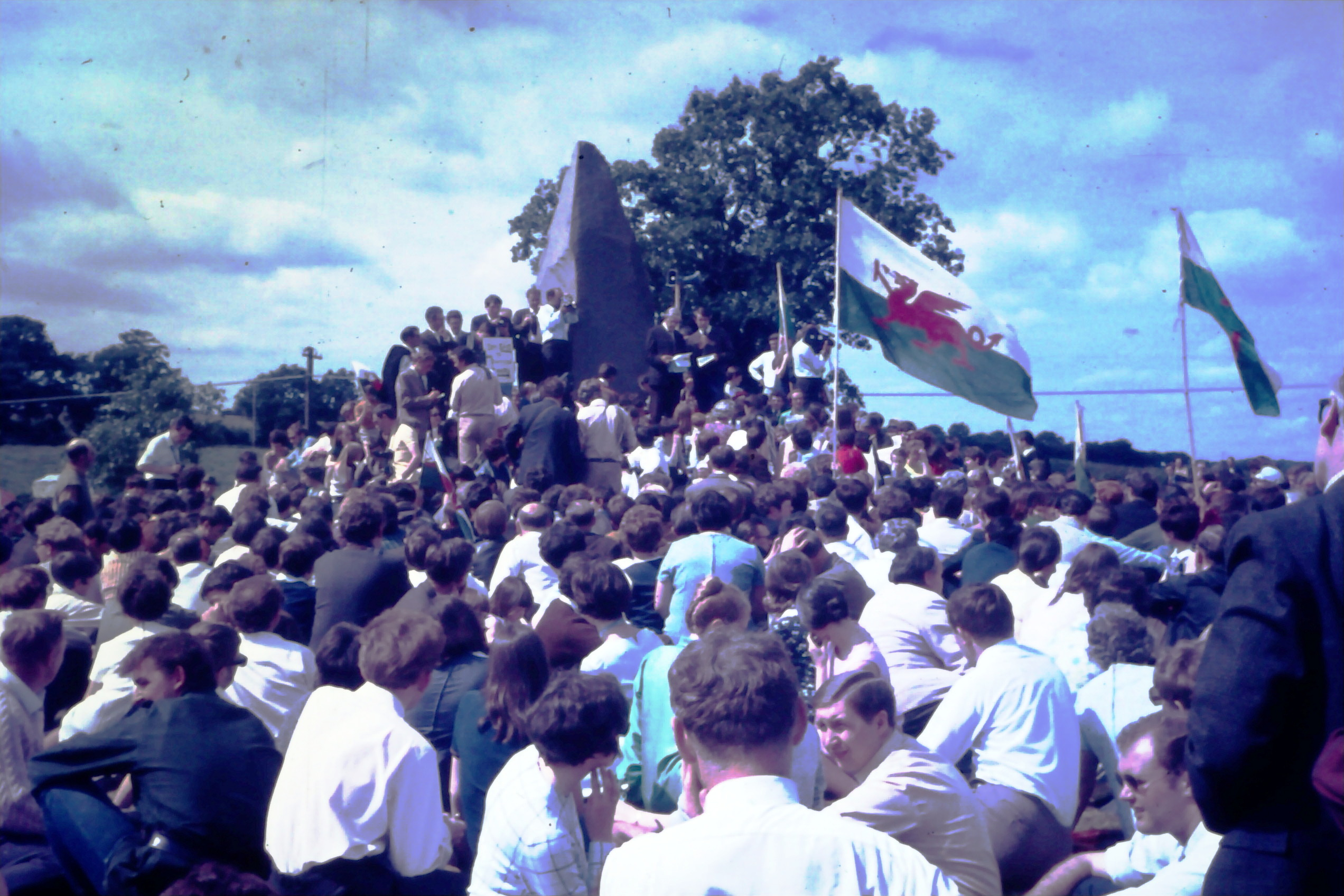
Protest against the Investiture of Charles, Prince of Wales at the memorial to Llywelyn the Last, native Prince of Wales in Cilmeri, near Builth Wells in 1969

The 1960s movement surrounding the investiture has historically been described as the "anti-investiture movement" and "anti-investiture sentiment". The investiture occurred during a period of revival of the Welsh national consciousness with an outspoken section considering it as an English prince being imposed upon Wales.

The investiture faced fierce opposition from people who saw the Prince of Wales as symbolic of Wales's occupation by the English crown. Nationalist sentiment had been on the rise, particularly since 1957 when a Welsh valley was evacuated and flooded to provide water for the English city of Liverpool.

In November 1967, as the Earl of Snowdon visited Cardiff to discuss arrangements for the investiture, a bomb went off.

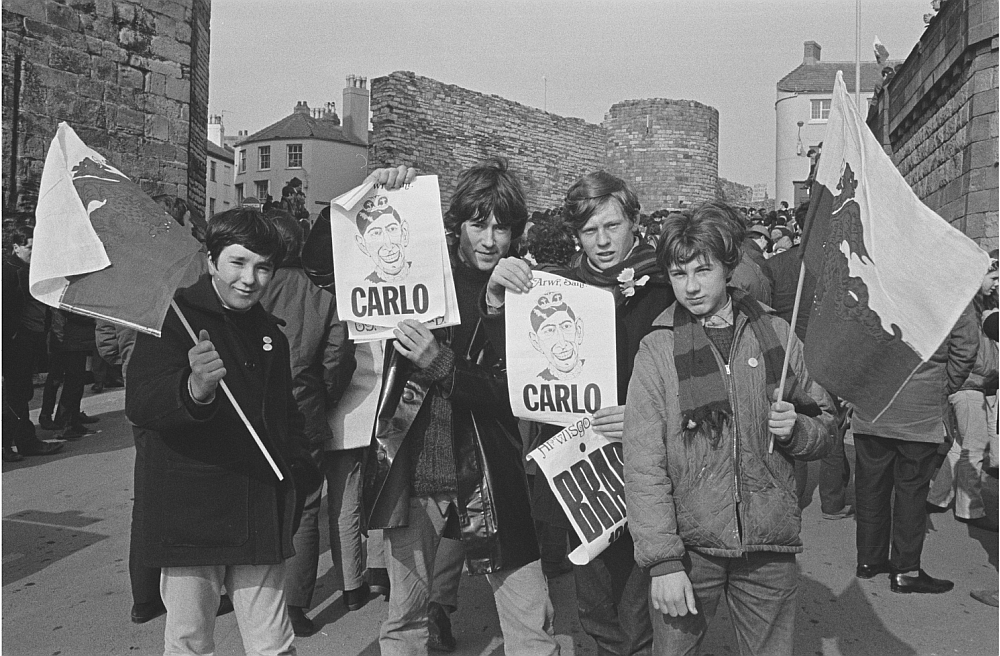
Protesters opposing the investiture of Prince Charles at Caernarfon Castle (1969)

Communities and institutions were divided on the issue of the investiture. These included the Urdd, Plaid Cymru, the Gorsedd and non-conformist denominations. Students in all of the University of Wales campuses held multiple sit-in protests and hunger strikes to show their opposition to the investiture. The FWA and Mudiad Amddiffyn Cymru also added to the tension. Because of the tension and protests leading up to the investiture of July 1969, the UK government drafted many soldiers and detectives, as well as agents provocateurs, to ensure a smoothly running ceremony in Caernarfon. Campaigning was led by Mudiad Amddiffyn Cymru (MAC, Movement for the Defence of Wales) and the Free Wales Army, with the situation described before the investiture as "something close to open warfare between the Government's police and young people of Wales".

Welsh singer Dafydd Iwan voiced his opposition and protest against investing Charles as Prince of Wales and also wrote a song "Carlo" mocking Charles. Iwan stated "[It is a] song to be taken lightly, ... like the Investiture itself, and every other vanity. The shame is that there was meaning and a serious purpose to [the role of] Prince of Wales once". The 25-year-old Dafydd Iwan's song became a popular anthem at the time.

The Welsh language youth festival, the Urdd Eisteddfod, elected not to send representatives to the investiture. But, due to their 1969 festival taking place in Aberystwyth where Charles was studying, the prince was invited to speak at the event. Protests erupted at the moment Charles started his speech, with two large groups simultaneously walking out shouting slogans including "Urdd has been betrayed".

Tedi Millward, professor of Welsh at Aberystwyth University, became friendly with Charles in the lead-up to the investiture whilst teaching him some Welsh. He refused invitations to the investiture ceremony, as well as the 1981 wedding of Prince Charles and Lady Diana Spencer. Charles himself said in 2019 "Every day I had to go down to the town where I went to these lectures, and most days there seemed to be a demonstration going on against me".

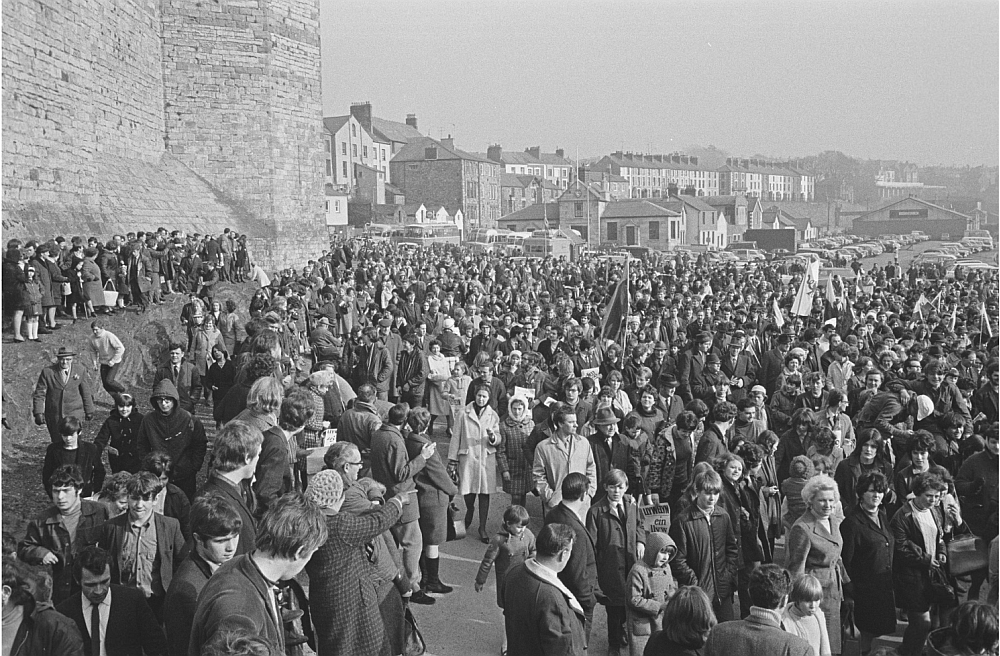
Cofia 1282 (Remember 1282), a protest against the investiture of Charles

The investiture of Charles as "Prince of Wales was controversial and also led to widespread protests in Wales. The group "Cofia 1282" ("Remember 1282", the death year of Llywelyn the Last) also held protests against the investiture.

The Welsh Language Society (Cymdeithas yr Iaith) also held a rally against the investiture on 29 August, 1969 at Cilmeri, the site of the death of Llywelyn the Last.

The day before the 1969 investiture, two members of MAC were killed when their home-made bomb exploded prematurely in Abergele, while they were planting it on a local government building. There were false speculations that they had intended to blow up the royal train.

=== Day of investiture ===
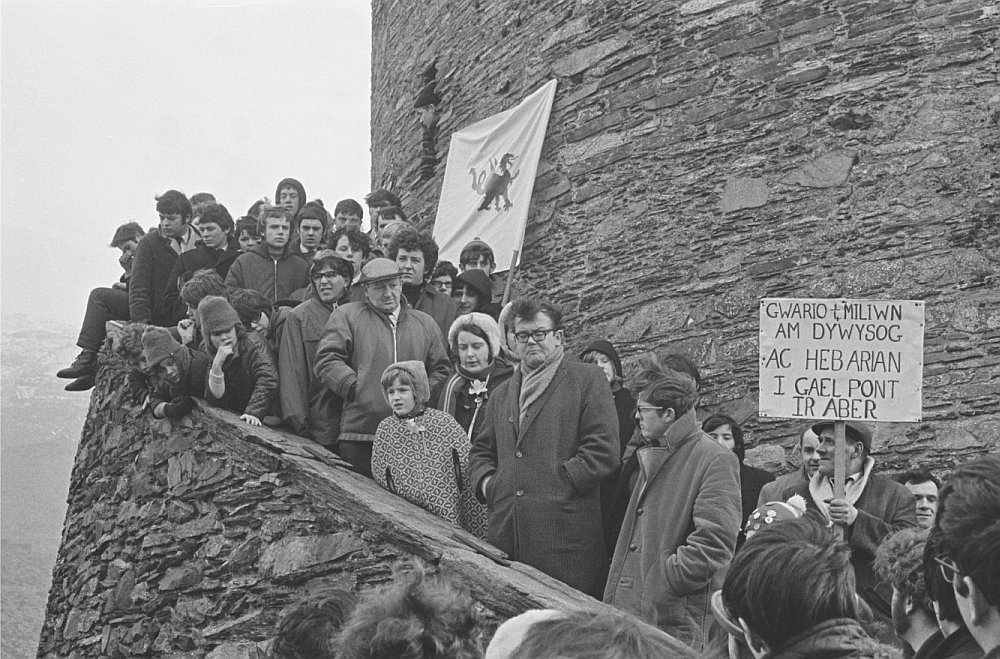
A section of a protest against the investiture outside the castle in March 1969

On the day of the investiture, a few nonviolent protesters were arrested. Some were escorted away carrying signs saying "Cymru nid Prydain" (Wales not Britain). Others booed and made obscene gestures at the royal carriages. One protester threw an egg at the Queen’s carriage as it passed by. Another threw a banana skin under the feet of the military escort as it processed by.

On the day of the ceremony, a young man threw an egg at the Queen's carriage, and he was leapt upon by the surrounding crowd. Helicopters flew overhead, drain covers in Caernarfon were sealed, and radio stations were surrounded by barbed wire, which meant a planned storming of Caernarfon Castle was impossible.

== In popular culture ==
The Prince of Wales's investiture was recreated during season 3 of the Netflix television series The Crown. Episode 6, named Tywysog Cymru (Prince of Wales), was first broadcast in November 2019, and portrays Charles's attendance at Aberystwyth University where he learnt to speak Welsh. The episode diverts from reality by showing Charles rewriting a Welsh-only speech to express an affinity with the Welsh struggle against oppression.

== Guests ==
=== British royal family ===
- The Queen and the Duke of Edinburgh, the Prince of Wales's parents
  - The Princess Anne, the Prince of Wales's sister
- Queen Elizabeth the Queen Mother, the Prince of Wales's maternal grandmother
  - The Princess Margaret, Countess of Snowdon and the Earl of Snowdon, the Prince of Wales's maternal aunt and uncle
    - Viscount Linley, the Prince of Wales's first cousin
    - Lady Sarah Armstrong-Jones, the Prince of Wales's first cousin
- The Duchess of Gloucester, the Prince of Wales's maternal grandaunt by marriage
  - Prince Richard of Gloucester, the Prince of Wales's maternal first cousin once removed
- The Duke and Duchess of Kent, the Prince of Wales's maternal first cousin once removed and his wife
- Princess Alexandra, The Hon. Mrs Angus Ogilvy and The Hon. Angus Ogilvy, the Prince of Wales's maternal first cousin once removed and her husband
- Prince Michael of Kent, the Prince of Wales's maternal first cousin once removed

==== Mountbatten family ====
- The Earl Mountbatten of Burma, the Prince of Wales's paternal granduncle

=== Other royal guests ===
- Princess Marie-Astrid of Luxembourg, the Prince of Wales's third cousin once removed (representing the Grand Duke of Luxembourg)

=== Diplomats and politicians ===
- Hubert Humphrey, former Vice President of the United States and his wife, Muriel Humphrey
- Tricia Nixon, daughter of President of the United States Richard Nixon
- The Rt Hon. Harold Wilson, Prime Minister of the United Kingdom, and his wife, Mary Wilson
- The Rt Hon. James Callaghan, Home Secretary of the United Kingdom

== See also ==
- 1969 Investiture Honours
- Investiture of the Prince of Wales
- Opposition to the Prince of Wales title
