= Investiture of Edward, Prince of Wales =

1911 royal ceremony in Caernarfon, Wales

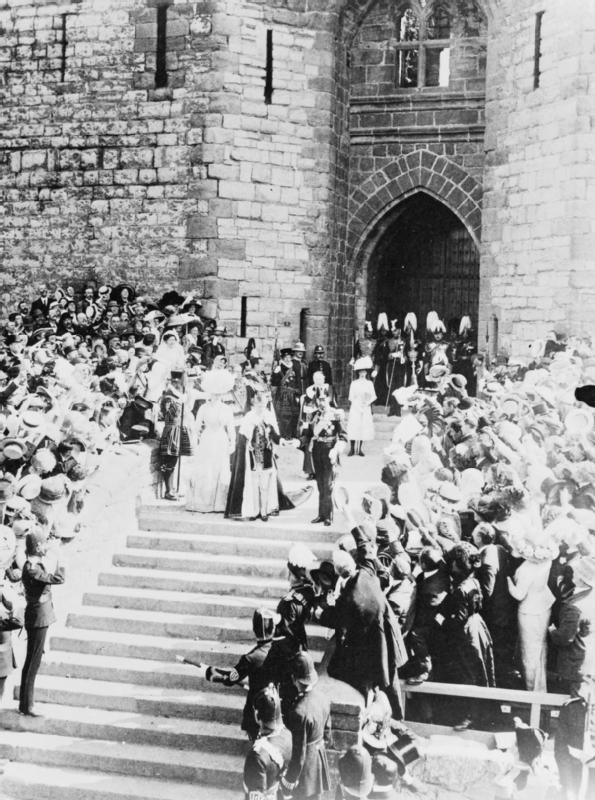
Members of the British royal family leave Caernarfon Castle following the investiture of the Prince of Wales, later Edward VIII, on 13 July 1911.

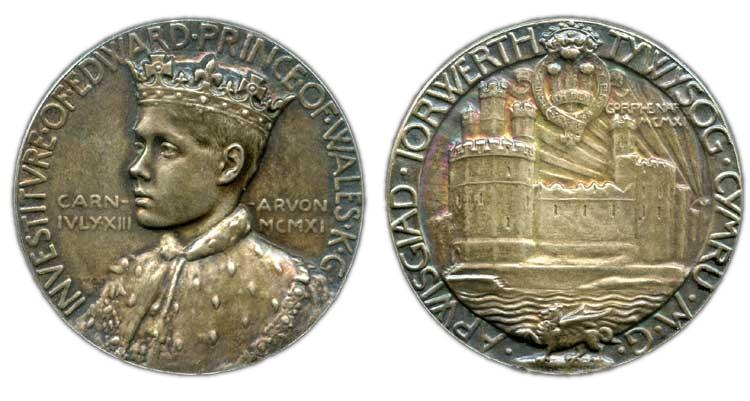
1911 Investiture Medallion, depicting Edward and Caernarfon Castle, designed by Sir William Goscombe John

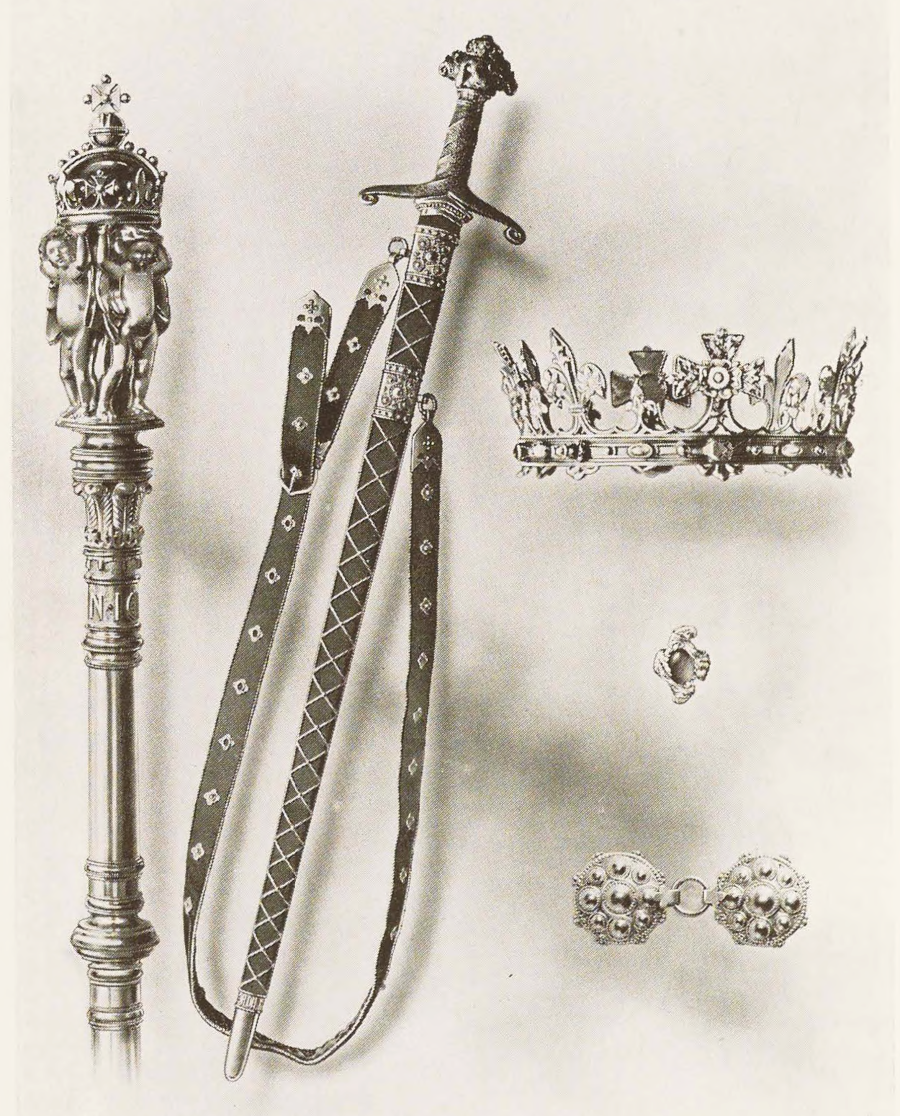
Honours of the Principality of Wales – sceptre, sword, crown, ring, and clasp for his mantle – which, apart from the crown, were designed by Goscombe John in 1911

The public investiture of Edward, Prince of Wales took place at Caernarfon Castle on Thursday 13 July 1911. This was the first investiture of the Prince of Wales to take place in Wales for centuries: since the 18th century, the Prince of Wales had been invested with his insignia of office privately, outside Wales.

== Background ==
The genesis of the 1911 investiture ceremony may be traced to a suggestion made by Queen Victoria's eldest daughter Victoria, Princess Royal, to the Bishop of St Asaph in 1893. She suggested that the next Prince of Wales should be invested at Caernarfon Castle, to revive ancient Welsh traditions. This suggestion was overlooked when the future George V became Prince of Wales in November 1901.

After the death of Edward VII in 1910, his eldest surviving son acceded to the throne as George V and George's eldest son Edward became heir apparent. Edward was created Prince of Wales by letters patent on 23 June 1910, his sixteenth birthday. The Bishop of St Asaph mentioned the idea of an investiture ceremony in Wales to the Chancellor of the Exchequer, David Lloyd George. Lloyd George been MP for Caernarvon Boroughs since 1890 and Constable of Caernarfon Castle since 1908. (Less romantically, a similar suggestion was made in the press in 1910 by the medievalist Owen Rhoscomyl.)

The new king quickly agreed, seeking to provide a focus for national unity at a time of political and constitutional turmoil in the UK: Lloyd George's People's Budget of 1909 was rejected by the House of Lords, followed by two indecisive general elections in 1910 resulting in two hung parliaments and a minority Liberal Party government supported by Irish MPs seeking Irish Home Rule, the prospect of disestablishment of the Anglican church in Wales, the Tonypandy riots, increasingly violent demands for and opposition to women's suffrage, the Siege of Sidney Street in January 1911, and the bill that became the Parliament Act 1911.

== Preparations ==
A royal proclamation was issued on 4 February 1911, announcing an investiture ceremony to be held at Caernarfon on 13 July. This ceremony would be less than a month after the Coronation of George V and Mary was held at Westminster Abbey on 22 June 1911.

To prepare for the ceremony, the castle was repaired by Frank Baines, an architect seconded from the Office of Public Works: he had overgrowth of ivy cleared and then the structure was repaired using stone from the original quarry and also oak imported from Canada. A ceremonial canopy was erected in the castle's outer bailey, with stands for 12,000 invited spectators on the sides of both inner and outer baileys, and space for a large Welsh choir, but most of the attending public remained outside the castle walls. A large body of soldiers was drawn from Western Command, with heavy representation from Welsh regiments.

== Ceremony ==
Despite fears of rain, the day of the investiture was hot and sunny. The Royal Family arrived at Holyhead on the Royal Yacht Victoria and Albert, returning from the King and Queen's coronation tour to Dublin. They travelled by train to Griffith's Crossing, where they were joined by an escort of Life Guards that accompanied a carriage procession on the 2.5 miles (4.0 km) by road to the castle. Edward, in white satin breeches and purple velvet cloak, went ahead, and paused at Castle Square to address the crowd in Welsh: he had been tutored by Lloyd George to say "Môr o gân yw Cymru i gyd" ("all Wales is a sea of song"). Lloyd George only had a small role on the day: presenting the key to the castle to the king when he arrived 20 minutes after Edward.

Once the king and his party were in place at the canopy in the outer bailey, Edward was escorted there by the Gorsedd of Bards arrayed in their new silk robes, and by peers in scarlet and ermine robes. The King was attended by the Prime Minister and the Home Secretary – respectively H. H. Asquith and Winston Churchill – both in formal court dress. Churchill had a prominent role: he read out the letters patent appointing Edward as Prince of Wales.

The king presented Edward with the insignia of his office – the Honours of Wales: a mantle and a coronet as a token of his princely rank (the coronet had been made for his father in 1901), a sword as a symbol of justice, a golden ring as a token of duty, and a golden rod as a symbol of government. The regalia incorporated gold mined in Merionethshire or Gwynedd, and the Welsh dragon is featured on the rod, ring and sword. Edward was then presented to the people of Wales, as Edward II had been centuries before. (Edward II was born in Caernarfon in 1284, and reputedly presented to the Welsh as a prince born in Wales and unable to speak English, before being appointed as the first non-native Prince of Wales (and Earl of Chester) in 1301.) The 1911 investiture regalia are on loan to the National Museum of Wales in Cardiff. The rod, ring and sword were re-used at Prince Charles's investiture as Prince of Wales in 1969, but a new coronet was made as Edward took his father's coronet into exile as Duke of Windsor and refused to return it.

The ceremony is depicted in a painting by the Welsh artist Christopher Williams commissioned by George V and held by the Royal Collection, with a different version of the scene held by Caernarfon Royal Town Council.

After the ceremony, the royal party rejoined the royal yacht off the North Wales coast, and continued the royal coronation tour to Scotland.

In contemporary news reports, "Edward Prince of Wales" became "Iorwerth Tywysog Cymru", and his German motto "Ich Dien" (I Serve) became the Welsh "Eich Dyn" (Your Man). Royal links with Wales were emphasised by noting Edward's descent from Henry Tudor and Henry VIII, and Pathé newsreel coverage mentioned the "medieval rites and ceremonies handed down through centuries of history". John S. Ellis has argued that this was largely an "invented tradition" which broke from the previous Conservative government's preference for assimilation and cultural uniformity under English hegemony and instead symbolised the Liberal government's project of "unity in diversity", exemplified by reconciliation with the Boers in South Africa after the Second Boer War, with their self-government before inclusion in the Union of South Africa. The new South African prime minister Louis Botha was the only prominent foreign dignitary at the investiture: he inspected a parade of boy scouts with his former enemy Baden Powell.

== See also ==
- Investiture of Charles, Prince of Wales in 1969
