= Mansun discography =

- Studio albums: 4
- Compilation albums: 5
- Singles: 17
- B-sides: 75
- Music videos: 16

The following is a comprehensive discography of the English alternative rock band Mansun.

== Studio albums ==
Year	Album details	Chart positions			BPI Certifications (sales thresholds)
Year	Album details	UK	SCO	JPN	BPI Certifications (sales thresholds)
1997	Attack of the Grey Lantern: Released: 17 February 1997; Label: Parlophone	1	3	–	Platinum
1998	Six: Released: 7 September 1998; Label: Parlophone	6	14	40	Gold
2000	Little Kix: Released: 14 August 2000; Label: Parlophone	12	13	47	Silver
2004	Kleptomania: Released: 27 September 2004; Label: Parlophone	135	–	186	

== Compilation albums ==
Year	Album details	Chart positions	
Year	Album details	UK	JPN
1996	Special Mini Album (Japan Only EP): Released: 23 October 1996; Label: Toshiba-EMI	N/R	–
2006	Legacy: The Best Of Mansun: Released: 18 September 2006; Label: Parlophone	144	–
2011	Six/Little Kix (2 Original Classic Albums): Released: 31 October 2011; Label: EMI	–	–
2020	The Dead Flowers Reject: Released: 29 August 2020; Label: Kscope	–	–
2020	Closed For Business: Released: 27 November 2020; Label: Kscope	–	–

== Singles ==
Mansun adopted a unique labeling system for their single releases. Their first two releases for the Parlophone label were Extended Plays, these were named One EP and Two EP. However, like most EPs the opening track was promoted as the key song. Subsequent singles were more focused around the opening track, but the band retained the EP label and with the exception of "Taxloss" and "I Can Only Disappoint U", all of their singles were numbered, though both those singles counted in the numbering.

The group's first single was paid and produced by the group on their own label; Sci-Fi Hi-Fi Records. The group's second single; "Skin Up Pin Up" / "Flourella" was released on the EMI affiliate Regal Records. All subsequent singles were issued by Parlophone/EMI.

Their final single, "Slipping Away", which was released after the group had disbanded, was commercially released as a 7" Vinyl and Download Release only.

Release date		Title	Chart Positions			Album
Release date		Title	UK	SCO	US Mod.	Album
1995	25 September	"Take It Easy Chicken"	–	–	–	—
1995	20 November	"Skin Up Pin Up / Flourella"	91	–	–	—
1996	25 March	"Egg Shaped Fred" (One EP)	37	42	–	Attack of the Grey Lantern
1996	3 June	"Take It Easy Chicken" (Two EP)	32	34	–	—
1996	9 September	"Stripper Vicar" (Three EP)	19	25	–	Attack of the Grey Lantern
1996	25 November	"Wide Open Space" (Four EP)	15	13	25	Attack of the Grey Lantern
1997	3 February	"She Makes My Nose Bleed" (Five EP)	9	8	–	Attack of the Grey Lantern
1997	28 April	"Taxloss"	15	18	–	Attack of the Grey Lantern
1997	6 October	"Closed for Business" (Seven EP)	10	10	–	—
1998	29 June	"Legacy" (Eight EP)	7	8	–	Six
1998	24 August	"Being a Girl (Part One)" (Nine EP)	13	14	–	Six
1998	26 October	"Negative" (Ten EP)	27	29	–	Six
1999	1 February	"Six" (Eleven EP)	16	21	–	Six
2000	31 July	"I Can Only Disappoint U"	8	9	–	Little Kix
2000	6 November	"Electric Man" (EP 13)	23	32	–	Little Kix
2001	29 January	"Fool" (Fourteen EP)	28	34	–	Little Kix
2004	20 September	"Slipping Away"	55	71	–	Kleptomania

== B-sides ==
Title	Year	A-side
"An Open Letter to a Lyrical Trainspotter"	1996	"Stripper Vicar"
"Been Here Before"	1998	"Being a Girl (Part One)"
"Being a Girl (Parts One & Two) (Live)"	1999	"Six"
"Black Infinite Space"	2001	"Fool"
"But the Trains Run on Time"	1999	"Six"
"Can't Afford to Die"	1998	"Legacy"
"Check Under the Bed"	1998	"Legacy"
"Church of the Drive Thru Elvis"	1999	"Six"
"Dark Mavis (Acoustic)"	1997	"Closed for Business"
"Decisions, Decisions"	2000	"I Can Only Disappoint U"
"Drastic Sturgeon"	1996	"Take It Easy Chicken"
"Drastic Sturgeon (Live)"	1997	"She Makes My Nose Bleed"
"Egg Shaped Fred (Acoustic)"	1997	"Closed for Business"
"Electric Man (Acoustic version)"	2000	"Electric Man"
"Everyone Must Win"	1997	"Closed for Business"
"Face in the Crowd"	1998	"Legacy"
"Fade in Time"	2001	"Fool"
"Flourella"	1997	"She Makes My Nose Bleed"
"Getting Your Way"	2004	"Slipping Away"
"Golden Stone"	2000	"I Can Only Disappoint U"
"Grey Lantern"	1997	"Taxloss"
"GSOH"	1998	"Legacy"
"Hidden Bonus Track"	1996	"Egg Shaped Fred"
"Hideout"	1998	"Being a Girl (Part One)"
"I Can Only Disappoint U (Perfecto Club Mix)"	2000	"Electric Man"
"I Can Only Disappoint U (Perfecto Instrumental)"	2000	"Electric Man"
"I Care"	1998	"Being a Girl (Part One)"
"I Deserve What I Get"	1998	"Negative"
"I've Seen the Top of the Mountain"	2001	"Fool"
"K.I.Double.S.I.N.G."	1997	"Closed for Business"
"King of Beauty"	1998	"Negative"
"Lemonade Secret Drinker"	1996	"Egg Shaped Fred"
"Lemonade Secret Drinker (Acoustic Version)"	1996	"Wide Open Space"
"Live Open Space"	1997	"She Makes My Nose Bleed"
"Live Television"	1999	"Six"
"Mansun's Only Acoustic Song"	1998	"Being a Girl (Part One)"
"Mansun's Only Live Song"	1998	"Negative"
"Moronica"	1996	"Take It Easy Chicken"
"Moronica (Acoustic Version)"	1996	"Wide Open Space"
"My Idea of Fun"	2000	"I Can Only Disappoint U"
"No One Knows Us"	1996	"Stripper Vicar"
"Promises"	2001	"Fool"
"Railings"	1998	"Being a Girl (Part One)"
"Rebel Without a Quilt"	1996	"Wide Open Space"
"Repair Man"	2000	"I Can Only Disappoint U"
"She Makes My Nose Bleed (Acoustic)"	1997	"She Makes My Nose Bleed"
"Ski Jump Nose (Acoustic Version)"	1998	"Legacy"
"Ski Jump Nose"	1996	"Egg Shaped Fred"
"Ski Jump Nose (Live)"	1997	"Taxloss"
"Skin Up Pin Up"	1996	"Wide Open Space"
"Spasm of Identity"	1998	"Legacy"
"Stripper Vicar (Live)"	1997	"Closed for Business"
"Take It Easy Chicken (Live)"	1998	"Negative"
"Taxloss (Gaudi Remix)"	1997	"Taxloss"
"Taxloss (John 'OO' Fleming Remix)"	1997	"Taxloss"
"Taxloss (Lisa Marie Experience Remix)"	1997	"Taxloss"
"Taxloss (Slam Remix)"	1997	"Taxloss"
"The Apartment"	2000	"Electric Man"
"The Drifters"	2000	"Electric Man"
"The Duchess"	1996	"Stripper Vicar"
"The Edge"	1996	"Stripper Vicar"
"The Holy Blood and the Holy Grail"	1997	"She Makes My Nose Bleed"
"The Gods of Not Very Much"	1996	"Wide Open Space"
"The Greatest Pain"	1996	"Take It Easy Chicken"
"The Impending Collapse of It All"	1997	"Taxloss"
"The Impending Collapse of it All (Acoustic Version)"	1998	"Legacy"
"The Most to Gain"	1997	"She Makes My Nose Bleed"
"The World's Still Open"	1997	"Closed for Business"
"Thief"	1996	"Egg Shaped Fred"
"Things Keep Falling Off Buildings"	1996	"Stripper Vicar"
"Vision Impaired"	1996	"Wide Open Space"
"What It's Like to be Hated"	1999	"Six"
"When the Wind Blows"	1998	"Negative"
"Wide Open Space (Acoustic)"	1997	"Taxloss"
"Wide Open Space (The Perfecto Remix)"	1998	"Legacy"
"Wide Open Space (Trouser Enthusiasts Hermaphrodite Circus Mix)"	1998	"Being a Girl (Part One)"

== Music videos ==
Year	Title	Director
1995	"Flourella"	edited by Nick Gordon
1996	"Egg Shaped Fred"	Lawrence Watson
1996	"Take It Easy Chicken"	Walter Stern
1996	"Stripper Vicar"	Dwight Clarke
1996	"Wide Open Space"	Paul Cunningham
1997	"Wide Open Space" (US Version)	Nigel Dick
1997	"She Makes My Nose Bleed"	John Hillcoat
1997	"Taxloss"	Roman Coppola
1997	"Closed for Business"	James Brown
1998	"Legacy"	Mike Mills
1998	"Being a Girl (Part One)"	Jamie Thraves
1998	"Negative"	Jamie Thraves
1999	"Six"	Grant Gee
2000	"I Can Only Disappoint U"	Grant Gee
2000	"Electric Man"	Grant Gee
2001	"Fool"	Phil Harder

== Miscellaneous releases ==
- Xmas Fanclub 7" vinyl (1998) - Live versions of "Everyone Must Win" and "Taxloss" recorded at Brixton Academy 23 October 1998
- "South of the Painted Hall" (2006) - Free Download available only to buyers of Legacy: The Best Of Mansun

== Contributions ==
- ChildLine (1996, Polygram TV) - "Ski Jump Nose (Cliff Nourell Mix)" (various artists charity compilation for ChildLine)
- Spawn: The Soundtrack (1997, Sony) - Skin Up Pin Up" (credited as Mansun & 808 State)
- Britpop at the BBC (2014, Warner Music) - "Wide Open Space" (Studio) and "Closed For Business (Live from the BBC)"
