= Legacy: The Best of Mansun =

Legacy: The Best Of Mansun

Greatest hits album by Mansun
- Released: 18 September 2006 (UK)
- Recorded: 1995–2006
- Genre: Alternative rock, Britpop
- Length: 72:41 (CD); 79:55 (Japan CD); 159:00 (DVD)
- Label: Parlophone
- Producer: Mark Stent; Michael Hunter; Hugh Padgham; Paul Draper

Mansun chronology
Kleptomania (2004)	Legacy: The Best Of Mansun (2006)

Professional ratings
Review scores
Source	Rating
AllMusic	4/5 stars
Pitchfork Media	(6.5/10)
Stylus Magazine	(B)
musicOMH	4/5 stars
Clickmusic.com	4/5 stars

Legacy: The Best Of Mansun (released 18 September 2006) is the first official 'best of' collection from Mansun. It collects all the bands Parlophone lead-EP tracks and selected album tracks which were compiled by Paul Draper and Dominic Chad. It was released as a standard CD, special edition CD and DVD set featuring all the bands promo videos and digital download. In Japan the compilation included two bonus tracks.

== Contents ==
There is an unreleased track "South of the Painted Hall" that you can download for free when you sign up on their mailing list and insert the CD into your computer. The track was recorded in 2001 for the band's fourth album. When the band split, all unreleased recordings were to be released as a compilation; Kleptomania. Unfortunately, the vocal track for "South of the Painted Hall" was lost and so the track was not included. During the compilation of Legacy, a demo CD was found in the archives containing a rough mix of the track, complete with vocals. It is this version that is available for download.

As Mansun's albums were concept albums, each a continuous piece of music, many of the band's singles had to be re-edited or even re-recorded, especially those from their second album Six. The single version of Being a Girl, for example, was just the first two minutes of section of a track which, on the album, lasted over seven.

The special edition included a DVD that featured all of the bands promo videos, a live performance of "Taxloss", a montage of video footage set to "Love Remains" and Nobody Cares When You're Gone a twenty-minute documentary produced for the compilation. The documentary was cut from the band's own personal footage and narrated by Paul Draper and Dominic Chad, who have given a new rare audio interview especially for the documentary (their first together since the end of the band).

== Track listing ==
All tracks are written by Paul Draper; except where indicated

CD
No.	Title	Writer(s)	Length
1.	"I Can Only Disappoint U" (single mix)	Paul Draper, Dominic Chad	4:21
2.	"Wide Open Space"		4:33
3.	"Stripper Vicar"		4:09
4.	"Being a Girl (Part One)"		2:00
5.	"Negative" (edit)	Paul Draper, Dominic Chad, Stove King, Andie Rathbone	3:43
6.	"Take It Easy Chicken" (Two EP recording)		4:28
7.	"Legacy" (radio edit)		5:56
8.	"She Makes My Nose Bleed"		4:08
9.	"Closed for Business"		3:07
10.	"Six" (single version)		3:57
11.	"Getting Your Way"		4:32
12.	"Electric Man" (single edit)		4:16
13.	"The Chad Who Loved Me"		5:03
14.	"Egg Shaped Fred" (One EP recording)		3:54
15.	"Slipping Away"		3:44
16.	"Fool" (edit)		3:34
17.	"Taxloss"		7:16

Bonus tracks
No.	Title	Writer(s)	Length
18.	"Skin Up Pin Up" (Japanese bonus track)		3:39
19.	"What It's Like to Be Hated" (Japanese bonus track)	Paul Draper, Dominic Chad	3:24
20.	"South of the Painted Hall" (Download-only bonus track, made available for download by visiting this website with the CD inserted)		3:24

DVD
No.	Title	Director	Length
1.	"Flourella"		4:24
2.	"Egg Shaped Fred"	Lawrence Watson	3:37
3.	"Take It Easy Chicken"	Walter Stern	4:29
4.	"Stripper Vicar"	Dwight Clarke	4:11
5.	"Wide Open Space"	Paul Cunningham	4:44
6.	"Wide Open Space (US version)"	Nigel Dick	4:38
7.	"She Makes My Nose Bleed"	John Hillcoat	4:10
8.	"Taxloss"	Roman Coppola	4:38
9.	"Closed for Business"	James Brown	3:58
10.	"Legacy"	Mike Mills	4:40
11.	"Being a Girl (Part One)"	Jamie Thraves	2:03
12.	"Negative" (Paul Draper, Dominic Chad, Stove King, Andie Rathbone)	Jamie Thraves	4:06
13.	"Six"	Grant Gee	3:58
14.	"I Can Only Disappoint U" (Paul Draper, Dominic Chad)	Grant Gee	4:31
15.	"Electric Man"	Grant Gee	4:21
16.	"Fool"	Phil Harder	4:14
17.	"Nobody Cares When You're Gone" (documentary)		19:54
18.	"Taxloss (Live at Brixton Academy – 23/10/98)"		6:38
19.	"Love Remains (Super 8 montage)"		2:47

== Personnel ==
Mansun were

- Paul Draper
- Dominic Chad
- Stove King
- Andie Rathbone

Early band members

- Carlton Hibbert (1995–1996)
- Mark Swinnerton (1995–1996)
- Julian Fenton (1996)

CD track listing credits

- Paul Draper - producer (2, 3, 4, 5, 6, 7, 8, 9, 11, 13, 14, 15, 17), strings arrangement (9), mixing (15)
- Hugh Padgham - producer (1, 12, 16)
- Mark 'Spike' Stent - producer (4, 5, 7), mixing (1, 2, 5, 6, 7, 8, 9, 12, 16, 17), additional production (8), strings recording (9)
- Arthur Baker - producer (10), mixing (10)
- Richard Rainey - producer (11, 15)
- Mike Hunter - co-producer (1, 12, 16), engineer (2, 5, 7, 8, 9, 19), assistant engineer (3, 6, 14), recording (4, 13, 17)
- Ian Caple - engineer (2, 3), recording (13, 17)
- Ronnie Stone - engineer (3, 6, 8, 14), recording (13), mixing (14)
- Cenzo Townshend - engineer (11, 15), mixing (11)
- Clif Norrell - mixing (3, 13)
- Nick Griffiths - mixing (18)
- Ian Grimble - mixing (19)
- Dominic Chad - harpsichord (9)
- Stephen Hussey - strings arrangement (9)

DVD credits

- Jonathan Walton - editing (Nobody Cares When You're Gone)
- Steve Lamacq - Audio interviewer (Nobody Cares When You're Gone)
- Jai Stokes - editing ("Taxloss (Live at Brixton Academy – 23/10/98)")
- Hollo - filmed on the road footage, 1997 ("Love Remains (Super 8 montage)")
- Grant Gee - filmed on-stage footage, 1998 ("Love Remains (Super 8 montage)")

Compilation credits

- Christian Wright - mastering (at Abbey Road Studios)
- Paul Draper, Dominic Chad - compilers
- Matt Davey - project co-ordination
- Pennie Smith - booklet photography
- Tom Sheehan, Neil Mersh, Yosuke Komatsu, Ian Tilson, Satako Owada (Positive Insanity), Amanda Smith - Front sleeve montage
- Traffic - Design

== Chart positions ==
Chart (2006)	Peak position
UK Album Chart	144
