= Electric Man =

2000 song by Mansun

"Electric Man (EP 13)"

Single by Mansun

from the album Little Kix
- B-side: I Can Only Disappoint U (Perfecto Mix)"
- Released: 6 November 2000 (UK); 13 December 2000 (Japan)
- Recorded: 2000, Astoria on the River Thames
- Genre: Alternative rock, symphonic rock
- Length: 5:21; 4:18 (Single Edit)
- Label: Parlophone (UK); Toshiba EMI (Japan)
- Songwriter(s): Paul Draper
- Producer(s): Hugh Padgham, Mike Hunter (co-producer)

Mansun singles chronology
"I Can Only Disappoint U" (2000)	"Electric Man (EP 13)" (2000)	"Fool" (2001)

"Electric Man" is a song by the English alternative rock band Mansun. The song was written by band-leader Paul Draper. It was recorded and produced by Hugh Padgham with co-producer Michael Hunter during sessions for the group's third studio album. The song was released as the second single in 2000 from the group's third album, Little Kix. The single disappointed commercially reaching the modest peak of #23 on the UK Singles Chart.

The music video for "Electric Man" was directed by Grant Gee.

Draper largely disowned the song along with the majority of Mansun's third album. In the liner-notes to Legacy: The Best of Mansun, Draper remarks that the song was his attempt to 'lighten up' after the insular Six album: 'Where can we go next after Six? I Know! Vaudeville, The 50s, The Beach Boys....Morecambe and Wise?! This track is my homage to Eric and Ernie.'

== Track listing ==
All tracks are written by Paul Draper; except where indicated.

UK CD one
No.	Title	Writer(s)	Length
1.	"Electric Man (Single Edit)"		4:18
2.	"The Drifters"		4:33
3.	"The Apartment"	Paul Draper, Dominic Chad	4:11

UK CD two (Includes a free poster)
No.	Title	Writer(s)	Length
1.	"Electric Man (Album Version)"		5:21
2.	"I Can Only Disappoint U (Perfecto Club Mix)"	Paul Draper, Dominic Chad	6:37
3.	"Electric Man (Acoustic Version)"		4:38

UK 12" vinyl
No.	Title	Writer(s)	Length
1.	"Electric Man"		5:21
2.	"I Can Only Disappoint U (Perfecto Club Mix)"	Paul Draper, Dominic Chad	6:37
3.	"I Can Only Disappoint U (Perfecto Instrumental)"	Paul Draper, Dominic Chad

Japan CD EP
No.	Title	Writer(s)	Length
1.	"Electric Man (Single Edit)"		4:18
2.	"The Drifters"		4:33
3.	"The Apartment"	Paul Draper, Dominic Chad	4:11
4.	"Electric Man (Acoustic Version)"		4:38

== Personnel ==
Mansun

- Paul Draper – lead vocals, acoustic guitar, keyboards
- Dominic Chad – electric guitar, backing vocals, piano
- Stove King – bass
- Andie Rathbone – drums, percussion

Production

- Hugh Padgham – producer (all tracks except "The Apartment")
- Mike Hunter – producer ("The Apartment" and The Drifters"), co-producer (all tracks except "The Apartment" and The Drifters"), mixing ("The Apartment" and The Drifters")
- Mark 'Spike' Stent – mixing (all tracks except "The Apartment" and The Drifters")
- Paul Oakenfold and Steve Osborne – remix (I Can Only Disappoint U (both mixes))
- Andy Gray (for 140 dB) – programming (I Can Only Disappoint U (both mixes))
- Anton Corbijn – photography
- Alex Hutchinson (at Free Barrabas!) – design

== Chart positions ==
Chart (2000)	Peak position
UK Singles Chart	23
Scottish Singles Chart	32
