= Attack of the Grey Lantern =

Studio album by Mansun
- Released: 17 February 1997
- Recorded: 1996–1997
- Genre: Britpop; psychedelia
- Length: 62:13
- Label: Parlophone
- Producer: Paul Draper, Ian Caple, Mark Stent

Mansun chronology
Attack of the Grey Lantern (1997)	Six (1998)

Singles from Attack of the Grey Lantern
- 1. "Egg Shaped Fred" Released: 25 March 1996; 2. "Stripper Vicar" Released: 9 September 1996; 3. "Wide Open Space" Released: 25 November 1996; 4. "She Makes My Nose Bleed" Released: 3 February 1997; 5. "Taxloss" Released: 28 April 1997

Attack of the Grey Lantern is the debut album by English alternative rock band Mansun released on 17 February 1997 via Parlophone. The album spent a total of 19 weeks on the UK Albums Chart, peaking at number one.

== Background ==
According to Mansun's Kleptomania liner notes, frontman Paul Draper states that "Take It Easy, Chicken" was their first song and the band really did not know how to play their instruments, let alone play as a band, when DJs Steve Lamacq and John Peel started to play the song on BBC Radio 1. Through 1996 and 1997, Mansun released "Egg Shaped Fred" (which was re-recorded for the album to include new drummer Andie Rathbone), "Stripper Vicar", "She Makes My Nose Bleed" and "Taxloss" (styled Taxlo$$). "Wide Open Space" became a dance anthem after being remixed by DJ and producer Paul Oakenfold under the production alias Perfecto. This remix was included on Oakenfold's compilation Resident: Two Years of Oakenfold at Cream, as an indicator of being one of the most played songs at major UK nightclub Cream, as well as in nightclubs around the world, over the 1997–1999 period.

"Taxloss" alludes melodically and lyrically to the Beatles' song "Taxman", and also to the rhythmic feel of "Tomorrow Never Knows", as well as "Long Haired Lover from Liverpool" by Little Jimmy Osmond. The video notoriously featured the band throwing £25,000 in five-pound notes onto the main concourse of London's Liverpool Street station during rush hour and watching the ensuing chaos.

== Concept album ==
While Mansun's singer and songwriter, Paul Draper, admits that Attack of the Grey Lantern is not a fully fledged concept album, it was his intention for it to be one, until he "ran out of steam", labelling the LP "half a concept album – a con album". AllMusic referred to the album as a song cycle. The majority of the record is centred on the concept of a superhero, known as "The Grey Lantern", in the guise of Draper himself. Throughout the album, the hero encounters a number of immoral inhabitants in a fictional English village.

Well, The Grey Lantern is like a comic-book hero – the album is about this village of people with really disgusting morals and the Grey Lantern sorts them out. I suppose the Grey Lantern's me. I wouldn't have a cape, but there are definitely characters on the record – Albert Taxloss, Chad, Dark Mavis. At the end of the album it all gets resolved and you find Mavis is actually the Stripper Vicar.

At the time of release, Draper hinted at a possible album sequel, titled "The Return of the Grey Lantern". For its American release, the album's running order was re-sequenced, a move which some felt compromised the intended concept, as the song "Stripper Vicar" was replaced with "Take It Easy, Chicken."

== Release ==
When Attack of the Grey Lantern was released in February 1997, it charted at No. 1 on the UK Albums Chart. The album was preceded by four singles, the first of which "Egg Shaped Fred" was released a year prior. "Egg Shaped Fred" was Mansun's début single for Parlophone Records and made No. 37 in the UK. The following three singles ("Stripper Vicar", "Wide Open Space", "She Makes My Nose Bleed") all made the top forty each improving of the previous singles' chart position. The final single released from the album was "Taxloss" which followed the album in April 1997 and made No. 15. In the US, Mansun enjoyed their only chart success with "Wide Open Space" reaching the modest position of No. 25 on the Billboard Modern Rock Tracks chart.

== Critical reception ==
Professional ratings
Review scores
Source	Rating
AllMusic	4.5/5 stars
Classic Pop	4/5 stars
The Guardian	5/5 stars
NME	8/10
Pitchfork	9.3/10
Q	4/5 stars
Rolling Stone	3/5 stars
Select	2/5
Uncut	4/5 stars
Vox	9/10

NME reviewer Mark Beaumont, while noting that by the album's end "we still haven't the foggiest idea of what Paul Draper is on about", praised Attack of the Grey Lantern as "music for an unrealistically massive film script that verges on the awesome with almost every fondled fret." In The Observer, Neil Spencer wrote that although "Mansun's guitar-driven sound veers rather too erratically between Nineties Britpop and Sixties psychedelia, the chime and idiosyncrasy of the songs hold steady, and with a scope that runs from Liverpudlian lovers to transvestite vicars, it's quintessentially English pop."

=== Accolades ===
Publication	Country	Accolade	Year	Rank
Melody Maker	United Kingdom	Best 50 Albums of the Year	1997	12
NME	United Kingdom	Best 50 Albums of the Year	1997	44
Q	United Kingdom	Best 50 Albums of the Year	1997	*
The Guardian	United Kingdom	Best 10 Pop CD's of the Year	1997	*

* denotes an unranked list.

== Track listings ==
UK edition

All tracks are written by Paul Draper; except where indicated.

No.	Title	Length
1.	"The Chad Who Loved Me"	5:02
2.	"Mansun's Only Love Song"	5:55
3.	"Taxloss"	7:02
4.	"You, Who Do You Hate?"	3:06
5.	"Wide Open Space"	4:31
6.	"Stripper Vicar"	4:05
7.	"Disgusting"	5:07
8.	"She Makes My Nose Bleed"	3:55
9.	"Naked Twister"	4:39
10.	"Egg Shaped Fred"	4:12
11.	"Dark Mavis" ("Dark Mavis" ends at 8:36, followed by hidden track "An Open Letter to the Lyrical Trainspotter", begins at 10:36)	14:38

Japanese edition

No.	Title	Length
1.	"The Chad Who Loved Me"	5:02
2.	"Mansun's Only Love Song"	5:55
3.	"Taxloss"	7:02
4.	"You, Who Do You Hate?"	3:06
5.	"Wide Open Space"	4:31
6.	"Stripper Vicar"	4:05
7.	"Disgusting"	5:07
8.	"She Makes My Nose Bleed"	3:55
9.	"Naked Twister"	4:39
10.	"Egg Shaped Fred"	4:11
11.	"Dark Mavis"	8:36
12.	"Flourella" (bonus track)	4:18
13.	"The Gods of Not Very Much" (bonus track)	4:39

US edition

No.	Title	Length
1.	"The Chad Who Loved Me"	5:02
2.	"Wide Open Space"	4:31
3.	"She Makes My Nose Bleed"	3:55
4.	"Naked Twister"	4:39
5.	"Take It Easy, Chicken"	4:26
6.	"You, Who Do You Hate?"	3:09
7.	"Mansun's Only Love Song"	5:55
8.	"Taxloss"	7:02
9.	"Disgusting"	4:21
10.	"Egg Shaped Fred"	4:12
11.	"Dark Mavis"	8:36

=== 2010 3CD collector's edition ===
Disc one same as UK edition

Disc two
No.	Title	Length
1.	"Egg Shaped Fred (Alternative Version)"	3:55
2.	"Ski Jump Nose"	3:41
3.	"Lemonade Secret Drinker"	3:47
4.	"Thief" + "Secret Track"	5:20
5.	"Take It Easy Chicken"	4:29
6.	"Drastic Sturgeon"	3:25
7.	"The Greatest Pain"	3:52
8.	"Moronica"	4:32
9.	"The Edge"	3:16
10.	"Duchess"	4:30
11.	"No One Knows Us"	3:41
12.	"Things Keep Falling off Buildings"	4:19
13.	"Rebel Without a Quilt"	4:09
14.	"Vision Impaired"	2:39
15.	"Skin Up Pin Up"	3:41
16.	"The Gods of Not Very Much"	4:39
17.	"Moronica (Acoustic)"	3:14
18.	"Lemonade Secret Drinker (Acoustic)"	2:47
19.	"The Most to Gain"	2:21
20.	"Flourella"	4:28
Total length:		76:45

Disc three
No.	Title	Writer(s)	Length
1.	"She Makes My Nose Bleed (Acoustic)"		3:32
2.	"The Holy Blood and the Holy Grail"	Paul Draper, Dominic Chad	4:39
3.	"Live Open Space"		4:43
4.	"Drastic Sturgeon (Live)"		3:18
5.	"Grey Lantern"		2:03
6.	"The Impending Collapse of It All"	Paul Draper, Dominic Chad	4:05
7.	"Ski Jump Nose (Live)"		6:32
8.	"Wide Open Space (Acoustic)"		4:16
9.	"Closed for Business"		3:03
10.	"K.I.Double.S.I.N.G."	Dominic Chad, Paul Draper, Stove King, Andie Rathbone	4:41
11.	"Everyone Must Win"	Dominic Chad, Howard Devoto, Paul Draper	5:37
12.	"The World's Still Open"		3:38
13.	"Dark Mavis (Acoustic)"		4:59
14.	"Stripper Vicar (Live)"		4:09
15.	"Egg Shaped Fred (Acoustic)"		2:51
16.	"The Impending Collapse Of It All (Acoustic)"	Paul Draper, Dominic Chad	4:26
17.	"Ski Jump Nose (Acoustic)"		2:37
18.	"(I'm in a) Wide Open Space" (Remix, performed by Greg Downey & Mansun)		7:14
Total length:			76:23

== B-sides ==
from "Egg Shaped Fred" (One EP)

- "Ski Jump Nose"
- "Lemonade Secret Drinker"
- "Thief"[+ Hidden Bonus Track]

from Take It Easy, Chicken (Two EP)

- "Drastic Sturgeon"
- "The Greatest Pain"
- "Moronica"

from "Stripper Vicar" (Three EP)

- "The Edge"
- "The Duchess"
- "An Open Letter to a Lyrical Trainspotter"
- "No One Knows Us"
- "Things Keep Falling Off Buildings"

from "Wide Open Space" (Four EP)

- "Rebel Without a Quilt"
- "Vision Impaired"
- "Skin Up Pin Up"
- "The Gods of Not Very Much"
- "Moronica (Acoustic Version)"
- "Lemonade Secret Drinker (Acoustic Version)"

from "She Makes My Nose Bleed" (Five EP)

- "The Most to Gain"
- "Flourella"
- "She Makes My Nose Bleed (Acoustic)"
- "The Holy Blood and the Holy Grail"
- "Live Open Space"
- "Drastic Sturgeon (Live)"

from "Taxloss" (Six EP)

- "Grey Lantern"
- "The Impending Collapse of It All"
- "Ski Jump Nose (Live)"
- "Wide Open Space (Acoustic)"
- "Taxloss (John 'OO' Fleming Remix)"
- "Taxloss (Lisa Marie Experience Remix)"
- "Taxloss (Gaudi Remix)"

== Personnel ==
Mansun

- Dominic Chad – lead guitar, piano, backing vocals, synthesizer
- Stove – bass
- Andie Rathbone – drums
- Paul Draper – vocals, guitars, piano, synthesizer, bass (4) drums (4), production

Technical personnel

- Stefan Giradet – string arrangement
- Clif Norrell – mixing
- Mike Hunter – recording, engineer
- Ian Caple – recording
- Mark Stent – mixing, additional recording, additional production
- Ronnie Stone – recording, engineer

== Charts ==
=== Weekly charts ===
Chart (1997)	Peak position
Scottish Albums (OCC)	3
UK Albums (OCC)	1

=== Year-end charts ===
Chart (1997)	Position
UK Albums (OCC)	71

== Certifications ==
Region	Certification	Certified units/sales
United Kingdom (BPI)	Gold	100,000^{^}
^{^} Shipments figures based on certification alone.
