= Closed for Business =

"Closed for Business (Seven EP)"

Single by Mansun
- Released: 6 October 1997 (UK); 10 December 1997 (Japan)
- Recorded: Parr Street Studios, 1997
- Genre: Alternative rock, new prog, post-punk
- Length: 2:59
- Label: Parlophone; Toshiba EMI (Japan)
- Songwriter: Paul Draper
- Producer: Paul Draper

Mansun singles chronology
"Taxloss" (1997)	"Closed for Business (Seven EP)" (1997)	"Legacy" (1998)

"Closed for Business" is a song by English rock band Mansun. It was released as the lead song on Seven EP in 1997 and became their second top ten hit on the UK Singles Chart.

== Overview ==
Seven EP was released in the interim between the touring of the band's début album and the recording of their second album, Six. The music on the EP reveals a transitional sound, in which the club-crossover britpop style of their earliest work is left behind for a more organic sound, one closer to progressive rock and post-punk. The EP sleeves are notable as they were adorned with two paintings by Stuart Sutcliffe.

Seven EP was released on Two CDs, and 7" Vinyl. CD Part One featured four new songs recorded during a session at Parr Street Studios. CD Part Two and the 7" featured live and acoustic versions of older material. "Everyone Must Win" was the first collaboration between the group and the Magazine front-man Howard Devoto. Magazine had been cited by Draper as a major influence particularly for their mix of synths and guitars. Draper said of the writing of Everyone Must Win, "This was my first collaboration and I was really nervous as to what Howard would think of it. This song became a regular in our live set."

"K.I.Double.S.I.N.G." is the first Mansun song in which bassist Stove King and drummer Andie Rathbone receive writing credits. Draper explained in the liner notes to Kleptomania that "The World's Still Open" was originally intended as the lead track but was relegated for being "too commercial".

== Track listing ==
All tracks are written by Paul Draper, except where indicated.

Limited edition clear 7" vinyl
No.	Title	Length
1.	"Closed for Business"	2:59
2.	"Egg Shaped Fred (Acoustic)"	2:50

CD Part one
No.	Title	Writer(s)	Length
1.	"Closed for Business"		2:59
2.	"K.I.Double.S.I.N.G."	Dominic Chad, Paul Draper, Stove King, Andie Rathbone	4:42
3.	"Everyone Must Win"	Dominic Chad, Howard Devoto, Paul Draper	5:38
4.	"The World's Still Open"		3:37

CD Part two (Includes a free poster)
No.	Title	Length
1.	"Closed for Business"	2:59
2.	"Dark Mavis (Acoustic)"	4:57
3.	"Stripper Vicar (Live)"	4:09
4.	"Multimedia Section" (Enhanced CD - Includes the "Taxloss" Promo Video and four Mansun trailers)

Japanese EP
No.	Title	Writer(s)	Length
1.	"Closed for Business"		3:02
2.	"K.I.Double.S.I.N.G."	Dominic Chad, Paul Draper, Stove King, Andie Rathbone	4:44
3.	"Everyone Must Win"	Dominic Chad, Howard Devoto, Paul Draper	5:38
4.	"The World's Still Open"		3:38
5.	"Dark Mavis (Acoustic)"		4:57
6.	"Stripper Vicar (Live)"		4:10
7.	"Egg Shaped Fred (Acoustic)"		2:50

== Personnel ==
Mansun

- Dominic Chad - Guitar, Backing Vocals, Harpsichord
- Paul Draper - Vocals, Guitar, Strings Arrangement ("Closed For Business")
- Andie Rathbone - Drums
- Stove - Bass

Production

- Stephen Hussey - Strings Arrangement ("Closed For Business")
- Mark 'Spike' Stent - Mixing and Strings Recording ("Closed For Business")
- Nick Griffiths - Mixing ("K.I.Double.S.I.N.G.", "Dark Mavis (Acoustic)", "Stripper Vicar (Live)", "Egg Shaped Fred (Acoustic)")
- Mike Hunter - Mixing ("Everyone Must Win", "The World's Still Open"), Engineering (all tracks)
- Stuart Sutcliffe - Paintings (Hamburg, 1961/1962, courtesy of Pauline Sutcliffe, KDK Gallery, London W10)

== Chart positions ==
Chart (1997)	Peak position
UK Singles Chart	10
Scottish Singles Chart	10
