= Wide Open Space =

1996 single by Mansun

Single by Mansun

from the album Attack of the Grey Lantern
- Released: 25 November 1996
- Recorded: Parr Street Studio, 1996
- Genre: Alternative rock, Britpop
- Length: 4:31
- Label: Parlophone
- Songwriter: Paul Draper
- Producer: Paul Draper

Mansun singles chronology
"Stripper Vicar" (1996)	"Wide Open Space" (1996)	"She Makes My Nose Bleed" (1997)

"Wide Open Space" is a song by Chester rock band Mansun, released as a single on 25 November 1996. The song was the lead track of Four EP. The single's success led to alternative versions appearing on four of the next five Mansun singles. These versions were one live, one acoustic, and two remixes, the first and most popular by Perfecto, and a NRG version by The Trouser Enthusiasts. A completely different version credited to longtime engineer Mike Hunter was included as a hidden bonus track on their compilation Kleptomania. The song also appears on The Sound of Gran Turismo, a soundtrack album based on the video game Gran Turismo.

== Background ==
Singer Paul Draper said, "I struggled for 6 months to find the lyrics from this song, I eventually got them from absorbing someone talking on TV which gave me the title, then I painted the imagery around that."

== History ==
"Wide Open Space" was not the group's most successful single in terms of sales or UK chart position – reaching number 15 in the UK Singles Chart – but propelled the group's career and is their best-known song. It was also the only single that gained significant exposure in the US, reaching number 25 on the Billboard Modern Rock Tracks chart in 1997. Paul Draper later wrote that he was the sole writer and performer of the song. In the liner notes of Legacy: Best Of, Draper explained having recorded the entire song sans the vocals six months before he wrote the lyrics.

Two videos were filmed to promote the single. The first, directed by Paul Cunningham, features the band playing in a small dilapidated room while Martino Lazzeri (Joe Williams from BBC's Grange Hill) walks around the London areas of Soho, St Paul's Cathedral on Ludgate Hill, and Highgate Cemetery, alienated and paranoid, amid vampiresque overtones. A second, simpler video was recorded for the US market, directed by Nigel Dick.

"Wide Open Space" became a dance anthem after being remixed by DJ and producer Paul Oakenfold (under the production alias Perfecto). This remix was included on Oakenfold's compilation Resident: Two Years of Oakenfold at Cream, sealing its status as one of the most played songs at major UK nightclub Cream, as well as in nightclubs around the world, over the 1997–1999 period.

"I thought 'Wide Open Space' was in the running for best single of last year," remarked Radiohead's Ed O'Brien in 1997. "They've got loads of ideas and they don't sound like us at all. They're supposed to be part of that 'New Grave' thing with us and the Manics, aren't they? Everything that article said was true: we all did have long overcoats and dodgy haircuts in the '80s."

== B-sides ==
"Vision Impaired" began life as a demo for Draper's previous group; Grind. The Glam infused track was initially called "I Lust You". It was an electronic composition with a heavy synth bass. The lyrics are mostly unchanged, apart from the chorus which emphasises the refrain 'I Lust You'.

"Skin Up Pin Up" was the group's first single for a proper label. It was originally released as a double 'A' side with "Flourella". The latter song was rerecorded for the "She Makes My Nose Bleed" single release. The version of "Skin Up Pin Up" is unchanged. A remixed version was created for the film Spawn: The Soundtrack. The remix was produced by 808 State.

"Moronica" and "Lemonade Secret Drinker" appeared on CD2 as acoustic versions, and had previously appeared on the Group's first two EPs (One EP and Two EP).

== Track listing ==
All tracks are written by Paul Draper.

Limited edition white 7" vinyl
No.	Title	Length
1.	"Wide Open Space"	4:32
2.	"Rebel Without A Quilt"	4:09

CD Part one
No.	Title	Length
1.	"Wide Open Space"	4:32
2.	"Rebel Without A Quilt"	4:09
3.	"Vision Impaired"	2:39
4.	"Skin Up Pin Up"	3:40

CD Limited edition part two
No.	Title	Length
1.	"Wide Open Space"	4:32
2.	"The Gods of Not Very Much"	4:39
3.	"Moronica (Acoustic Version)"	3:14
4.	"Lemonade Secret Drinker (Acoustic Version)"	2:47

12" vinyl promo (Released 1998)
No.	Title	Length
1.	"Wide Open Space (Perfecto Mix)"	7:16
2.	"Wide Open Space (Trouser Enthusiasts Hermaphrodite Mix)"	8:49

== Personnel ==
Mansun

- Dominic Chad – lead guitar, piano, backing vocals, synthesizer
- Stove – bass
- Andie Rathbone – drums
- Paul Draper – vocals, guitars, piano, synthesizer, bass, drums, lead guitar, piano, backing vocals, production

Production

- Mike Hunter – engineer ("Wide Open Space", "Rebel Without A Quilt", "The Gods of Not Very Much")
- Ian Caple – engineer/co producer ("Wide Open Space")
- Mark 'Spike' Stent – mixing ("Wide Open Space")
- Nick Griffiths – engineer ("Vision Impaired", "Moronica (Acoustic Version)", "Lemonade Secret Drinker (Acoustic Version)")
- Ronnie Stone – engineer ("Skin Up Pin Up")
- Richard Lewis – photography
- Pennie Smith – photography
- Stylorouge London – design

== Chart positions ==
Chart (1996/97)	Peak position
UK Singles Chart	15
Scottish Singles Chart	13
US Billboard Alternative Songs	25
