= She Makes My Nose Bleed =

1997 single by Mansun

"She Makes My Nose Bleed (Five EP)"

Single by Mansun

from the album Attack of the Grey Lantern
- Released: 3 February 1997
- Recorded: 1995 (Demo); 1996 (Studio)
- Genre: Alternative rock, Britpop
- Length: 3:55
- Label: Parlophone
- Songwriter(s): Paul Draper
- Producer(s): Paul Draper, Mark 'Spike' Stent

Mansun singles chronology
"Wide Open Space" (1996)	"She Makes My Nose Bleed (Five EP)" (1997)	"Taxloss" (1997)

"She Makes My Nose Bleed" is a song by the English alternative rock band Mansun. The song was written by band-leader Paul Draper. It was recorded and produced by Draper with additional production by Mark 'Spike' Stent during sessions for the group's début studio album. The song was one of four demoed by the group in 1995 that helped the group secure a publishing contract with Polygram Music Publishing. The song was released as the fourth single (their fifth on a major-label, also known as Five EP) in early 1997 from the group's debut album, Attack of the Grey Lantern. The single was a big commercial success for the group breaking them into the UK Top Ten for the first time with a peak of #9.

The music video for "She Makes My Nose Bleed" was directed by John Hillcoat.

== Meaning ==
The song's title was interpreted by the media as a reference to Cocaine, Mark Sutherland for example reviewing the song for the NME described the lyrics as 'Coke-crazy'. Draper refuted the interpretation in the liner-notes to Legacy: The Best of Mansun. Draper described the writing process and the song's meaning: 'This one started as She Makes Me Bleed but that sounded too earnest. So I added the 'nose' bit assuming everybody would think I was really witty. Instead everybody just thought I was a big druggy!'

== Track listing ==
All tracks are written by Paul Draper; except where indicated.

UK Limited edition poster bag red 7" / Europe CD (slipcase)
No.	Title	Writer(s)	Length
1.	"She Makes My Nose Bleed"		3:55
2.	"The Holy Blood and the Holy Grail"	Paul Draper, Dominic Chad	4:39

UK CD one
No.	Title	Length
1.	"She Makes My Nose Bleed"	3:55
2.	"The Most to Gain"	2:20
3.	"Flourella"	4:27
4.	"She Makes My Nose Bleed (Acoustic)"	3:32

UK CD two (includes a free poster) / Europe CD
No.	Title	Writer(s)	Length
1.	"She Makes My Nose Bleed"		3:55
2.	"The Holy Blood and the Holy Grail"	Paul Draper, Dominic Chad	4:39
3.	"Live Open Space"		4:43
4.	"Drastic Sturgeon (Live)"		3:17

== Personnel ==
Mansun

- Dominic Chad – lead guitar, piano, backing vocals, synthesizer
- Stove – bass
- Andie Rathbone – drums
- Paul Draper – vocals, guitars, piano, synthesizer, production

Production

- Paul Draper – producer
- Mike Hunter – engineer (all tracks except "She Makes My Nose Bleed (Acoustic)"), additional overdubs ("The Most to Gain")
- Ronnie Stone – engineer ("She Makes My Nose Bleed", "Flourella", "The Holy Blood and the Holy Grail")
- Mark 'Spike' Stent – additional production ("She Makes My Nose Bleed"), mixing ("She Makes My Nose Bleed", "The Most to Gain", "The Holy Blood and the Holy Grail"), additional overdubs ("The Most to Gain")
- Ian Caple – recording ("The Most to Gain"), engineer ("Flourella")
- Clif Norrell – mixing ("Flourella")
- Nick Griffiths – recording, engineer ("She Makes My Nose Bleed (Acoustic)")
- Barnaby and Scott – photography
- Neil Mersh – band photography (CD two)
- Pennie Smith – band photography (7")
- Stylorouge London – artwork

== Chart positions ==
Chart (1997)	Peak position
UK Singles Chart	9
Scottish Singles Chart	8
