= Kleptomania (album) =

Studio album by Mansun
- Released: 27 September 2004 (UK)
- Recorded: 1995–2003
- Length: 193:40
- Label: Parlophone
- Producer: Paul Draper; Mark Stent; Michael Hunter

Mansun chronology
Little Kix (2000)	Kleptomania (2004)	Legacy: The Best of Mansun (2006)

Singles from Kleptomania
- 1. "Slipping Away" b/w "Getting Your Way" Released: 20 September 2004

Kleptomania is the fourth and final album by English rock band Mansun, released posthumously in September 2004, following the band's split, as a triple album. The first CD features the material that was to form the basis of the band's next album, which was originally going to be self-titled, and the other 2 CDs feature EP tracks, outtakes and demos.

The band split up while recording songs for the album Kleptomania, leaving unfinished tracks that were never released. An extensive explanation of the break-up has never been made public although a press release by Paul Draper stated that the band had simply "grown apart".

EMI had originally not intended to release the material until an online petition, which gained over 4000 signatures, demonstrated that there was demand for it from fans. Draper was not in a positive frame of mind about Mansun at the time, but agreed to work on the material after EMI contacted him, on the basis that the material would be released as part of a boxset featuring other material.

== Notes ==
=== Recording ===
Despite previewing several tracks from Kleptomania live on what was Mansun's final tour of 2002, Stove King's playing did not feature on any of the tracks which were included. Instead Dominic Chad and Paul Draper shared bass duties.

Kleptomania was recorded at several locations including St. Catherine's Court, a recording studio owned by Jane Seymour, where fellow Parlophone act Radiohead recorded their acclaimed album OK Computer, and at Rockfield Studios, which has been used by acts such as Queen and the Stone Roses. Paul Draper later stated that the band split in the middle of recording "Cry 2 My Face".

Paul Draper states in the sleeve notes that "Good Intentions Heal the Soul" was always intended to conclude the album. The song features one of the singer's most open lyrics throughout Mansun's career; Draper had attempted to write lyrics which were more direct.

=== Song information ===
The boxset includes a retrospect by Paul Draper in which he talks about each track included on the album.

Kleptomania contains a number of hidden tracks. The first disc contains an instrumental called "The Dog from Two Doors Down" (credited to "The Nurk Twins"). The third disc contains three: "Thief", different mix of an earlier EP B-side track; "Witness to an Opera" an instrumental version of a song from the band's second album Six; and "Stupid Open Space" a jazz-funk cover of Wide Open Space (credited to Mike Hunter).

The tracks for Disc 2 were selected by an online poll on the band's official website which allowed fans to choose any of the band's releases whether a non-album single or B-side singles. Paul Draper also chose to include "When the Wind Blows" and "Decisions, Decisions", which weren't in the top 20 tracks voted by fans.

"Slipping Away" was released as a download and 7" only single prior to the full release of Kleptomania. "Getting Your Way" was featured as the B-Side.

In recent interviews Paul Draper stated that if the band had stayed together and released the fourth album properly, they would have issued "Love Remains" as the lead-off single.

"Rock 'n' Roll Loser" was mentioned on fan site Mansunite, and was talked about on there as the possible first single from Little Kix. As mentioned in the sleeve notes of Kleptomania, the band soon lost interest in it and it was left in the vaults until its addition on disc three of Kleptomania.

"Shot by Both Sides" is not only a Magazine cover, but also one of the few Mansun songs sung by lead guitarist Dominic Chad.

"South of the Painted Hall" is an unreleased track was recorded in 2001 during the intended sessions for the fourth Mansun album. It was released in 2006 as a free download available to buyers of their compilation album, Legacy: Best Of.

== Track listing ==
All tracks written and composed by Paul Draper; Except where indicated.

=== Disc one ===
The 4th Album Sessions
No.	Title	Length
1.	"Getting Your Way"	4:30
2.	"Slipping Away"	4:51
3.	"Keep Telling Myself"	3:58
4.	"Harris"	3:25
5.	"Love Remains"	2:45
6.	"Cry 2 My Face"	4:10
7.	"No Signal/No Complaints"	4:53
8.	"Home"	3:46
9.	"Fragile"	3:41
10.	"Wanted So Much"	3:26
11.	"Good Intentions Heal the Soul"	26:12
12.	"The Dog from Two Doors Down" (Hidden bonus track)

Note
Instrumental track between "Slipping Away" and "Keep Telling Myself" composed and performed by Dominic Chad, from The Parrot Sessions

=== Disc two ===
Non-Album Singles, B-Sides and EP-Only Tracks
No.	Title	Writer(s)	Length
1.	"Take It Easy Chicken"		4:31
2.	"Everyone Must Win"	Paul Draper, Howard Devoto, Dominic Chad	5:40
3.	"Closed for Business"		3:08
4.	"Ski Jump Nose"		3:43
5.	"Can't Afford to Die"	Paul Draper, Dominic Chad	2:50
6.	"Railings" (with Howard Devoto)	Howard Devoto	5:54
7.	"Flourella" (Original Version)		4:23
8.	"Decisions, Decisions"	Paul Draper, Dominic Chad	6:03
9.	"Been Here Before"	Paul Draper, Dominic Chad	4:12
10.	"My Idea of Fun"	Paul Draper, Dominic Chad	4:01
11.	"When the Wind Blows"	Paul Draper, Dominic Chad	4:51
12.	"Check Under the Bed"	Paul Draper, Dominic Chad	4:12
13.	"Skin Up Pin Up"		3:42
14.	"I Care"		3:41
15.	"The World's Still Open"		3:38
16.	"Take It Easy Chicken" (Video, enhanced CD Japanese bonus track)		4:31

=== Disc three ===
Rarities, Demos and Unreleased Tracks
No.	Title	Writer(s)	Length
1.	"Rock 'n' Roll Loser"		4:03
2.	"Secrets"		3:34
3.	"These Days" (Full Length Version)		4:26
4.	"It's OK"		4:43
5.	"Drones"		3:29
6.	"Right to the End of the Earth"		3:30
7.	"I Can Only Disappoint U" (Home Demo)	Paul Draper, Dominic Chad	5:01
8.	"Love Is..." (Home Demo)		4:26
9.	"Love Remains" (Home Demo)		2:22
10.	"Shot by Both Sides" (Live John Peel Session)	Howard Devoto, Pete Shelley	3:39
11.	"Taxloss" (Live)		24:21
12.	"Witness to an Opera" (Hidden bonus track – Instrumental Version of "Witness to a Murder (Part Two)")	Dominic Chad
13.	"Thief" (Alternative Version - 2nd Hidden bonus track)
14.	"Stupid Open Space" (3rd Hidden bonus track – Instrumental Easy Listening Version of "Wide Open Space")

== Personnel ==
=== Mansun ===
- Paul Draper
- Dominic Chad
- Stove King
- Andie Rathbone

Early band members

- Carlton Hibbert (1995–1996)
- Mark Swinnerton (1995–1996)
- Julian Fenton (1996)

=== Technical ===
CD1 The 4th Album Sessions

- Paul Draper – vocals, guitars, bass, keyboards
- Dominic Chad – backing vocals, guitars, bass, keyboards
- Andie Rathbone – drums, percussion
- Richard Rainey and Paul Draper – producer
- Cenzo Townshend – engineer (1–8, 11), mixing (1, 9, 10)
- Barney Chase – engineer (9, 10)
- Paul Draper – mixing (2–8, 11)
- Mike Hunter – mixing (3–7, 11)
- Chris Agnew – drum programming (10)
- The Nurk Twins – performer (12)

CD2 Non-Album Singles, B-Sides and EP-Only tracks

- Paul Draper – producer (1–7, 9, 11, 13–15), string arrangement (3)
- Mike Hunter – assistant engineer (1, 4), engineer (2, 3, 7, 10, 15), mixing (2, 10, 15), recording (5, 6, 9, 12), co-producer (8), producer (10)
- Mark 'Spike' Stent – mixing (1, 3, 9, 11, 14), strings recording (3), producer (9, 11, 14), recording (9, 14)
- Ronnie Stone – engineer (1, 4, 7, 13), mixing (4)
- Dominic Chad – harpsichord (3)
- Stephen Hussey – string arrangement (3)
- Ian Grimble – mixing (5, 6, 12)
- Howard Devoto – producer (6)
- Ian Caple – engineer (7)
- Hugh Padgham – producer (8), mixing (8)
- Anne Dudley – strings scoring (8)

CD3 Rarities, Demos and Unreleased Tracks

- Paul Draper – producer (1–3, 6), mixing (1–3, 6), recording (7–9)
- Hugh Padgham – producer (1)
- Mike Hunter – engineer (1), mixing (1–4, 6), performer (14)
- Richard Rainey – producer (2, 3, 6)
- Cenzo Townshend – engineer (2)
- Barney Chase – engineer (3, 6)
- Cliff Norrell – producer (4, 5), engineer (4, 5), mixing (5)
- Anita Kamath – BBC Radio 1 show producer (10)
- Miti Akhiri – engineer (10)
- Ian Grimble – mixing (11)

Compilation credits

- Paul Draper – compilation, sleeve notes
- Matt Davey – project co-ordination
- Geoff Pesh and Doug Shearer – mastering (at Townhouse)
- Mark Beaumont – foreword
- Pennie Smith, Tom Sheehan, Neil Mersh, Ian Tilton, Ian Jennings, Yosuke Komatsu and Anton Corbijn – photography
- Traffic – design

== Charts ==
Chart (2004)	Peak position
Japanese Oricon Album Chart	185
UK Album Chart	136
