= Take It Easy Chicken =

EP by Mansun
- Released: 25 September 1995; 3 June 1996 (Two EP)
- Recorded: Sonic Studios Ealing, London, Summer 1995 (Original version); 1996 (Re-recorded version)
- Genres: Indie rock, Britpop
- Length: 4:30
- Labels: Sci-Fi Hi-Fi Records (1995 release); Parlophone (1996 release); Epic (1997 US release)
- Producer: Paul Draper

Mansun chronology
"Take It Easy Chicken" (1995)	"Skin Up Pin Up / Flourella" (1995)
"Egg Shaped Fred" (One EP) (1996)	"Take It Easy Chicken" (Two EP) (1996)	"Stripper Vicar" (1996)

Two EP
- 1996 EP sleeve

"Take It Easy Chicken" (sometimes written "Take It Easy, Chicken") is a song by Chester rock band Mansun first released in 1995. It was the first song that the group ever recorded, and was later re-recorded and released as the lead track of the Two EP, the group's fourth release overall. An instrumental version appears in the PAL version of Gran Turismo 2.

== Overview ==
The début single was only pressed to one thousand 7" vinyl copies in 1995, on the band's own garden shed label "Sci-Fi Hi-Fi Records". The spelling of the group's name was 'MANSON'.

Two EP was released on CD, Cassette and 7" Vinyl. Two EP peaked at #32 on the UK Singles Chart in June 1996.

In Japan three tracks from Two EP were compiled with the majority of the group's later release Three EP under the title Special Mini Album (Japan Only EP).

It was not included on the standard editions of the début album Attack of the Grey Lantern, US editions released by Epic records substituted the single "Stripper Vicar" for "Take It Easy Chicken". A music video for the song was directed by Walter Stern.

Paul Draper explained in the liner notes to Kleptomania that the song was recorded in a day along with four other songs in a self-financed session in "the cheapest studio we could find in the back of the Melody Maker". The track was pressed up to vinyl and sent out to radio stations. John Peel and Steve Lamacq played the song on BBC Radio 1 to Draper's surprise: "I couldn't believe it when I first heard them play the song, we'd never played a gig, could hardly play live and had no record deal". "Take It Easy Chicken" was the group's traditional closing song during live performances and was regularly extended, a nine-minute version recorded at Barrowlands, Glasgow was included as a b-side to "Negative" in 1998. A live version of "Drastic Sturgeon" included as a b-side to "She Makes My Nose Bleed" in 1997. An acoustic version of "Moronica" was featured on the "Wide Open Space" single in 1996.

Take It Easy Chicken begins with a sample from the Jimmy Spicer song The Bubble Bunch.

== Track listing ==
All tracks are written by Paul Draper.

1995 'Manson' – 7"
No.	Title	Length
1.	"Take It Easy Chicken"	4:24

1996 Two EP – 7"/Cassette/CD
No.	Title	Length
1.	"Take It Easy Chicken"	4:30
2.	"Drastic Sturgeon"	3:23
3.	"The Greatest Pain"	3:51
4.	"Moronica"	4:32

1997 U.S. release – CD
No.	Title	Length
1.	"Take It Easy Chicken"	4:26
2.	"Flourella"	4:25
3.	"Ski Jump Nose"	3:40
4.	"Stripper Vicar"	4:08

== Personnel ==
Mansun

- Chad – Lead Guitar
- Paul Draper – Vocals, Guitar
- Hib – Drums
- Stove – Bass

Production

- Mike Hunter – Engineering ("Take It Easy Chicken", "Drastic Sturgeon", "Moronica")
- Ronnie Stone – Engineering ("Take It Easy Chicken", "Drastic Sturgeon", "Moronica")
- Clive Martin – Mixing ("Drastic Sturgeon", "The Greatest Pain", "Moronica"), Engineering ("The Greatest Pain")
- Mark 'Spike' Stent – Mixing ("Take It Easy Chicken" Re-recorded version)

== Chart positions ==
Chart (1996)	Peak position
UK Singles Chart	32
Scottish Singles Chart	34
