= Fool (Mansun song) =

2001 single by Mansun

"Fool (Fourteen EP)"

Single by Mansun

from the album Little Kix
- Released: 29 January 2001
- Recorded: 2000, Astoria on the River Thames
- Genre: Alternative rock, symphonic rock
- Length: 4:17; 3:35 (Edit)
- Label: Parlophone
- Songwriter(s): Paul Draper
- Producer(s): Hugh Padgham, Mike Hunter (co-producer)

Mansun singles chronology
| "Electric Man" (2000) | "Fool (Fourteen EP)" (2001) | "Slipping Away" (2004) |

"Fool" is a song by the English alternative rock band Mansun. The song was written by band-leader Paul Draper. It was recorded and produced by Hugh Padgham with co-producer Michael Hunter during sessions for the group's third studio album. The song was released as the third and final single in early 2001 from the group's third album, Little Kix. The single disappointed commercially reaching the low peak of #28 on the UK Singles Chart during the typically quiet post-Christmas singles market.

The music video for "Fool" was directed by Phil Harder.

Paul Draper was particularly dismissive of the track calling it his 'least favourite Mansun track'. Writing in the liner-notes to Legacy: The Best of Mansun, he describes "Fool" as an ironic song inspired by a book on songwriting by Jimmy Webb. The song played a part in further straining relations between Draper and the label: 'Bowie intro, comical chorus lyrics and guess what? The label (Parlophone) wanted it as a fucking single! I couldn't believe it.'

== Track listing ==
All tracks are written by Paul Draper; except where indicated.

UK CD one
| No. | Title | Length |
|---|---|---|
| 1. | "Fool (Edit)" | 3:35 |
| 2. | "I've Seen The Top Of The Mountain" | 5:06 |
| 3. | "Promises" | 5:28 |

UK CD two
| No. | Title | Writer(s) | Length |
|---|---|---|---|
| 1. | "Fool" | | 4:17 |
| 2. | "Fade In Time" | | 4:40 |
| 3. | "Black Infinite Space" | Paul Draper, Dominic Chad | 4:43 |

UK Cassette
| No. | Title | Length |
|---|---|---|
| 1. | "Fool (Edit)" | 3:35 |
| 2. | "I've Seen The Top Of The Mountain" | 5:06 |

== Personnel ==
Mansun

- Paul Draper – lead vocals, acoustic guitar, keyboards
- Dominic Chad – electric guitar, backing vocals, piano
- Stove King – bass
- Andie Rathbone – drums, percussion

Production

- Hugh Padgham – producer ("Fool")
- Mike Hunter – producer (all tracks except "Fool"), engineering (all tracks except "Fool"), mixing (all tracks except "Fool"), co-producer ("Fool")
- Mark 'Spike' Stent – mixing ("Fool")
- Anton Corbijn – band photograph
- Alex Hutchinson (at Free Barrabas!) – design

== Chart positions ==
| Chart (2001) | Peak position |
|---|---|
| UK Singles Chart | 28 |
| Scottish Singles Chart | 34 |
