= Taxloss =

Single by Mansun

from the album Attack of the Grey Lantern
- Released: 26 March 1997 (Japan); 28 April 1997 (UK); December 1998 (Fanclub 7")
- Recorded: 1996–7
- Genre: Alternative rock, psychedelic rock, dance-rock
- Length: 7:19; 4:27 (Single version)
- Label: Parlophone; Toshiba EMI (Japan)
- Songwriter(s): Paul Draper
- Producer(s): Paul Draper

Mansun singles chronology
"She Makes My Nose Bleed" (1997)	"Taxloss" (1997)	"Closed for Business" (1997)

"Taxloss" (sometimes stylised as "Taxlo$$") is a song by the English alternative rock band Mansun. The song was written by band-leader Paul Draper. It was produced by Draper and mixed by Mark 'Spike' Stent during sessions for the group's debut studio album. The song was edited down from over seven minutes to four and a half minutes released as a single in April 1997, the fifth single from the group's debut album, Attack of the Grey Lantern, and their sixth on a major-label. The single charted in the top twenty at #15 on the UK Singles Chart and continuing the group's run of four consecutive top twenty singles.

The single was supposed to be titled Six EP as part of the group's unique naming system, but was not labelled as such for unknown reasons. The single was released on two CDs and a 12" vinyl of remixes (a first for the group). Each remix is a major rework in Techno and Progressive Trance styles. The remixes were produced by John 'OO' Fleming, Lisa Marie Experience, Gaudi, and Slam, the latter of which appeared only on the Promo 12".

"Taxloss" was released as a special Fan club 7" vinyl single in December 1998. The single featured live versions of the song and "Everyone Must Win" recorded at Brixton Academy 23/10/1998 during the group's tour to support their second album Six.

== Music video ==
On 17 April 1997, director Roman Coppola filmed the music video using hidden cameras to capture members of the video production crew (the band did not appear in the video) throwing £25,000 in £5 notes (each with a white sticker with the word "Taxlo$$" in red) from the upper concourse of Liverpool Street Station onto commuters below. All this information is imparted in the finished music video which includes all the preparation for the stunt from the withdrawal of the cash through to the news reports after the event. The ensuing chaos as the crowd scrambled for the cash was intended to highlight human greed.

== Track listing ==
All tracks are written by Paul Draper, except where indicated.

UK CD Part One (Includes a free poster)
No.	Title	Length
1.	"Taxloss"	7:19
2.	"Grey Lantern"	2:04
3.	"Taxloss (Lisa Marie Experience Remix)"	6:10

UK CD Part Two
No.	Title	Writer(s)	Length
1.	"Taxloss"		4:27
2.	"The Impending Collapse of It All"	Dominic Chad, Paul Draper	4:04
3.	"Ski Jump Nose (Live)" (recorded live at Derby Assembly Rooms)		6:31
4.	"Wide Open Space (Acoustic)"		4:16

UK 12" Vinyl Remixes
No.	Title	Length
1.	"Taxloss (John 'OO' Fleming Remix)"
2.	"Taxloss (Album Version)"	7:19
3.	"Taxloss (Lisa Marie Experience Remix)"	6:10
4.	"Taxloss (Gaudi Remix)"

12" Vinyl Promo Remixes
No.	Title	Length
1.	"Taxloss (John 'OO' Fleming Remix)"
2.	"Taxloss (Slam Remix)"
3.	"Taxloss (L.Mex Mix)"	6:10
4.	"Taxloss (Gaudi Remix)"

CD Japan Only Two EP
No.	Title	Writer(s)	Length
1.	"Taxloss"		4:27
2.	"The Holy Blood and the Holy Grail"	Dominic Chad, Paul Draper	4:39
3.	"Live Open Space"		4:43
4.	"Drastic Sturgeon (Live)"		3:17

Fanclub 7" Vinyl (Released 12/1998)
No.	Title	Writer(s)	Length
1.	"Taxloss (Live)" (recorded at Brixton Academy 23/10/1998)
2.	"Everyone Must Win (Live)" (recorded at Brixton Academy 23/10/1998)	Paul Draper, Dominic Chad, Howard Devoto

== Personnel ==
Mansun

- Dominic Chad – lead guitar, piano, backing vocals, synthesizer
- Stove – bass
- Andie Rathbone – drums
- Paul Draper – vocals, guitars, piano, synthesizer

Production

- Paul Draper - producer ("Taxloss", "The Impending Collapse of It All", "Wide Open Space (Acoustic)", "The Holy Blood and the Holy Grail")
- Ian Caple - recording ("Taxloss")
- Mike Hunter - recording ("Taxloss", "The Holy Blood and the Holy Grail"), engineer ("The Holy Blood and the Holy Grail")
- Mark 'Spike' Stent - mixing ("Taxloss", "The Holy Blood and the Holy Grail")
- Nick Griffiths - mixing and engineering ("Grey Lantern", "The Impending Collapse Of It All", "Wide Open Space (Acoustic)")
- Ian Grimble - mixing ("Taxloss (Live)", "Everyone Must Win (Live)")
- Pennie Smith - photography
- Stylorouge London - artwork

== Chart positions ==
Chart (1997)	Peak position
UK Singles Chart	15
Scottish Singles Chart	18
