= Slipping Away (Mansun song) =

Single by Mansun

from the album Kleptomania
- Released: 20 September 2004
- Recorded: 2003
- Length: 4:51; 3:44 (Edit)
- Label: Parlophone
- Songwriter(s): Paul Draper
- Producer(s): Richard Rainey, Paul Draper

Mansun singles chronology
"Fool" (2001)	"Slipping Away" (2004)

"Slipping Away" is a song by the English alternative rock band Mansun released as the group's final single on 20 September 2004 to promote the group's last studio album Kleptomania. The single was released on 7" vinyl and Digital download only charting at #55 for one week on the UK Singles Chart. The song was written by band-leader Paul Draper. It was recorded and produced by Richard Rainey and Paul Draper during sessions for the group's aborted fourth studio album.

== Track listing ==
All tracks are written by Paul Draper.

UK 7" and Promo CD
No.	Title	Length
1.	"Slipping Away"	3:44
2.	"Getting Your Way"	4:30

== Personnel ==
Mansun

- Paul Draper – vocals, electric guitar, bass, keyboards
- Dominic Chad – backing vocals, electric guitar, bass, keyboards
- Andie Rathbone – drums, percussion

Production

- Richard Rainey – producer
- Paul Draper – producer, mixing ("Slipping Away")
- Cenzo Townshend – engineer, mixing ("Getting Your Way")
- Traffic – design

== Chart positions ==
Chart (2001)	Peak position
UK Singles Chart	55
Scottish Singles Chart	71
