= Joe Fenton =

Joe Fenton may refer to:

- Joseph Fenton (1953–1989), Northern Ireland estate agent, killed by the Provisional Irish Republican Army for acting as an informer
- Joe Fenton (Doctors), a fictional character in the British soap opera Doctors
- Joe Fenton (artist) (born 1971), London-based artist, designer, sculptor and illustrator
