= AOTGL =

AOTGL may refer to:

- Attack of the Giant Leeches, a 1959 science fiction-horror film
- Attack of the Grey Lantern, a 1997 album by Mansun
