= Egg Shaped Fred =

Single by Mansun

One EP ("Egg Shaped Fred")

EP by Mansun
- Released: 25 March 1996 (UK); 5 June 1996 (Japan)
- Recorded: 1996
- Genre: Alternative rock, Britpop
- Length: 16:42
- Label: Parlophone; Toshiba EMI (Japan)
- Producer: Paul Draper

Mansun chronology
Skin Up Pin Up / Flourella (1995)	One EP ("Egg Shaped Fred") (1996)	"Take It Easy Chicken" (Two EP) (1996)

"Egg Shaped Fred" (lead track of One EP) is a song by the English alternative rock band Mansun. The song was written by band-leader Paul Draper. It was produced by Draper, mixing and engineering by Ronnie Stone with assistance from the group's long-term collaborator Mike Hunter. Released in 1996 the song was the group's major label début for Parlophone and their third release overall. It was released as One EP, using the band's own numbering system. The EP was their first to enter the UK Top 40 peaking at #37."Egg Shaped Fred" was remixed and extended for inclusion on Mansun's debut album Attack of the Grey Lantern in 1997.

The promotional music video for "Egg Shaped Fred" was directed by Lawrence Watson.

== Track listing ==
All tracks are written by Paul Draper.

7"/Cassette
No.	Title	Length
1.	"Egg Shaped Fred"	3:53
2.	"Ski Jump Nose"	3:42
3.	"Lemonade Secret Drinker"	3:46
4.	"Thief"	3:31

UK CD/Japanese CD
No.	Title	Length
1.	"Egg Shaped Fred"	3:53
2.	"Ski Jump Nose"	3:42
3.	"Lemonade Secret Drinker"	3:46
4.	"Thief"	3:31
5.	"Hidden Bonus Track" (Included on the end of "Thief")	1:47

== Personnel ==
Mansun

- Dominic Chad - lead guitar
- Paul Draper - vocals, guitar
- Hib - drums
- Stove - bass

Production

- Paul Draper - producer
- Ronnie Stone - engineering, mixing
- Mike Hunter - engineering assistant, mixing assistant
- Mansun - sleeve
- Vegas - sleeve

== Chart positions ==
Chart (1996)	Peak position
UK Singles Chart	37
Scottish Singles Chart	42
