= Mark Beaumont (journalist) =

English music journalist

- Born: 2 June 1972 (age 54); Enfield, England
- Occupation: Music journalist
- Writing career
- Period: 1995-present

Mark Beaumont (born 2 June 1972) is an English music journalist.

== Career and writing style ==
A contributor to such titles as The Times, ShortList, The Guardian and Uncut, Beaumont's writings have predominantly appeared in NME, where he has written numerous reviews and interviews since 1995 and has also functioned as the magazine's letters and singles page editor. Considered by NME editor Conor McNicholas one of the title's "star" writers, Beaumont has frequently been assigned the task of reviewing latest releases and gigs from high-profile artists including Arctic Monkeys, Black Rebel Motorcycle Club, Coldplay, Muse and Yeah Yeah Yeahs.

In his writings, Beaumont has often favoured a caustic, confrontational and at times humorous prose style, especially when writing on artists or records that he does not hold in particularly high regard.

Beaumont has also been noted for caustic left-wing political opinions, often entirely unrelated to the media being reviewed. In 2021, when reviewing Russian disaster film Chernobyl: Abyss, Beaumont described the United Kingdom as "a country that has overseen over 120,000 largely unnecessary deaths during a national crisis due to the incompetence, lies, contempt for its citizens and rampant cover-ups and cronyism of its extremist government". In the same article he further describes the 2019 HBO Chernobyl miniseries as being "very handy at a time when it might be politically advantageous to conflate the nightmares of communism with the potentials of socialism".

Beaumont wrote a band biography for the liner notes of the band Mansun's 2004 posthumous album Kleptomania, and in 2008, he released a biography of the band Muse entitled Out Of This World. In September 2012 his latest artist biography, Jay-Z: The King Of America, was released by Omnibus Press. In June 2014, his biography of the band the Killers was released.

=== 2007 Keith Richards interview ===
In April 2007, Beaumont found himself at the centre of a media storm when NME published his now-infamous interview with Keith Richards. Beaumont had asked Richards what the strangest thing he had ever snorted was, and quoted him as replying:

My father. I snorted my father. He was cremated and I couldn't resist grinding him up with a little bit of blow. My dad wouldn't have cared, he didn't give a shit. It went down pretty well, and I'm still alive.

Amid the media uproar that followed, Richards' manager said the remark had been made in jest, but Beaumont told the BBC Radio 4 Today programme that he believed Richards had been telling the truth, adding: "He did seem to be quite honest about it. There were too many details for him to be making it up". He later told Uncut that the interview had been conducted by telephone and that he had misquoted Richards at one point (reporting that Richards had said he listens to Motörhead, when what he had said was Mozart), but that he still believed the veracity of the ash-snorting anecdote. Richards later confirmed in an interview with Mojo that he had, in fact, snorted his father's ashes - with no cocaine mixed in - before burying them under an oak tree: "I said I'd chopped him up like cocaine, not with."
