= DJ Greyboy =

- Also known as: Andreas Stevens
- Origin: San Diego, United States
- Genre: Acid jazz
- Label: Soundlock Recordings
- Website: http://www.soundlock.com (former website)

DJ Greyboy (a.k.a. Andreas Stevens) is an acid jazz DJ from San Diego, California now residing in Long Beach, California. Early in his career he was the partner of Rob Dyrdek in Crime on the Turn Tables. His style of music includes hip hop, soul, funk, experimental, and acid jazz rare grooves. Greyboy has tracks on numerous compilations. He is co-founder and namesake of The Greyboy Allstars. In 2009 Greyboy founded his own record label "Soundlock Recordings" as well as a turntable band called "Warchurch" members include Delmos Wade, DJ Truly Odd, Erick Coomes, Tycoon, Mike Long and Opie Ortiz. In 2010 he released a co-produced album with Delmos Wade titled From the Ground Up. Greyboy collaborated with rock band Incubus on a track "Familiar", which appeared on the soundtrack of the film Spawn.
