= Julian Fenton =

English musician (born 1964)

- Born: Julian John Bramley; 21 May 1964 (age 62); Marylebone, London, England
- Genres: Alternative rock

Julian Fenton (born Julian John Bramley 21 May 1964 in Marylebone, London) is an English rock drummer, composer and teacher, formerly of 1990s rock bands Kinky Machine and Mansun.

Following the split of Kinky Machine in 1995, Fenton briefly joined Mansun in 1996, filling in between the band's original drummer Hib's departure and Andie Rathbone's recruitment. Fenton notably performed with the group at that years T in the Park and has also toured with the Lightning Seeds, Duran Duran, ABC, TJ Johnson and His Band, A-ha, Jimmy Ruffin and Arthur Brown.

Fenton's stepfather, Neil Aspinall was tour manager and personal assistant for the Beatles and was regarded by some, including George Harrison, as "the Fifth Beatle". He is also the half-brother of artist Joe Fenton.

Fenton currently plays with various rock, jazz, funk and reggae bands and, having studied himself with Trevor Tomkins and Bob Armstrong, also teaches drums himself.
