= Spooky Action =

Studio album by Paul Draper
- Released: 11 August 2017
- Recorded: 2004–2017
- Genres: Alternative rock, progressive rock
- Length: 54:00
- Label: Kscope
- Producers: Paul Draper, Catherine Anne Davies

Paul Draper studio album chronology
Spooky Action (2017)	Cult Leader Tactics (2022)

Singles from Spooky Action
- 1. "Feeling My Heart Run Slow" Released: 27 April 2016; 2. "Friends Make the Worst Enemies" Released: 13 October 2016; 3. "Don't Poke the Bear" Released: 7 June 2017; 4. "Things People Want" Released: 11 August 2017; 5. "Grey House" Released: 27 October 2017; 6. "Jealousy Is a Powerful Emotion" Released: 6 February 2018

Spooky Action is the debut solo album by English singer songwriter and ex-Mansun frontman Paul Draper, released on 11 August 2017. It entered the UK Albums Chart at No. 19 and peaked at No. 3 on the UK Independent Albums Chart.

== Background ==
The album was conceived over a period of over ten years. Whilst Draper had been working with Skunk Anansie's Skin on her second album, he had recorded some demos. Many of those recordings were later archived by Draper and had been forgotten about. Draper returned to the recordings, having co-produced The Anchoress's debut solo album to press attention and critical acclaim and re-worked those recordings in addition to new material.

“I had a lot to write about. It was just another form of therapy. It's been a cathartic process. I don't work in a professional manner, I do it to heal something – whatever that is. I got a lot of anger out and I'm on the other side of it now. It's taken a lot to get there."

== Critical reception ==
The album holds a rating of 79 out of 100 on Metacritic, indicating positive reviews. Uncut described the album as possessing "impressive heft", whilst Mojo's positive review highlighted "strong synth tunes and beats, bristling with vocal angst". In its five-star review, Louder Sound commented that the album "benefits from a strength of songwriting most often found on artists' debut albums, when they've had a lifetime of tunes to draw on, rather than a few weeks holed up in a studio with a record company breathing down their necks."

=== Accolades ===
Spooky Action was nominated for Album of the Year at the annual Progressive Music Awards.

== Commercial performance ==
The album entered and peaked at No. 19 on the UK Albums Chart. On the independent albums chart, it peaked at No. 3.

== Track listing ==
All songs written by Paul Draper, unless otherwise stated.

1. "Don't Poke the Bear" (Paul Draper, Catherine Anne Davies)
2. "Grey House"
3. "Things People Want" (Paul Draper, Richard Ayre)
4. "Who's Wearing the Trousers"
5. "Jealousy Is a Powerful Emotion" (Paul Draper, Catherine Anne Davies)
6. "Friends Make the Worst Enemies" (Paul Draper, Catherine Anne Davies)
7. "Feeling My Heart Run Slow"
8. "You Don't Really Know Someone 'til You Fall Out with Them" (Paul Draper, Catherine Anne Davies)
9. "Can't Get Fairer Than That"
10. "Feel Like I Wanna Stay" (Paul Draper, Dominic Chad)
11. "The Inner Wheel (Paul Draper, Catherine Anne Davies)

== Personnel ==
- Paul Draper - guitars, keyboards, piano, synths, vocals
- Ben Stack - bass
- Jon Barnett - drums
- Catherine Anne Davies - synthesizer on tracks 3, 4 & 11, piano on track 6, Vox Continental on tracks 6 & 8, backing vocals on tracks 6, 10 & 11
- Andy Lyth - bongos on track 1
- Gill Wood - strings on track 1, cello on tracks 6 & 8
- Matt Davey - additional guitar on track 5

=== Production ===
- Produced by Paul Draper
- Mixed by Paul "PDub" Walton at The Loft
- Engineered by Paul "PDub" Walton and Scott Knapper
- Additional Engineering by Catherine Anne Davies
- Assistant Engineer: Ben Sink
- Mastered by Jon Astley

=== Design ===
- Design & Art Direction by Steve Stacey
- Portrait Photography by Anthony Gerace

== B-sides ==
From EP One

- "No Ideas"
- "The Silence Is Deafening"

From EP Two

- "Some Things Are Better Left Unsaid"
- "Don't You Wait, It Might Never Come"
- "Friends Make the Worst Enemies" (acoustic)

== Remixes ==
From EP One

- "F.M.H.R.S." (The Sad Twilight Remix)

== Formats ==
The album was released on the following physical formats:

- Standard digipack CD
- Double black vinyl (orders from the official store included a signed art print)
- 'Indies Only' double black vinyl with free 7" single containing 'No Ideas' and 'Friends Make The Worst Enemies' ('Public Service Broadcasting Remix)
- Limited edition hand numbered cassette
- Limited edition double white vinyl
- Limited edition double clear vinyl
- Special edition double CD (with Live at Scala)
- Limited edition 3-disc book set (with outtakes and documentary)

== Tour and Live at Scala ==
Draper went on a UK tour with a full band to support the album. The 21 September 2017 concert at The Scala in London was recorded and released as a live album on 16 February 2018. The live album was released on vinyl and CD as well as a special edition double-CD package with Spooky Action.

Spooky Action 2017 Tour dates:

Thu 14th Leeds, Brudenell Social Club

Fri 15th Manchester, Gorilla

Sat 16th Glasgow, King Tuts

Thu 21st London, Scala

Fri 22nd Bristol, Thekla

Sat 23rd Birmingham, Institute 2

== Charts ==
Chart (2017)	Peak position
UK Albums Chart	19
UK Independent Albums Chart	3
UK Physical Albums Chart	8
UK Vinyl Albums Chart	4
