= Spawn (1997 film) =

Film by Mark A.Z. Dippé

- Theatrical release poster
- Directed by: Mark A.Z. Dippé
- Screenplay by: Alan B. McElroy
- Story by: Alan B. McElroy; Mark A.Z. Dippé
- Based on: Spawn by Todd McFarlane
- Produced by: Clint Goldman
- Starring: Michael Jai White; John Leguizamo; Martin Sheen; Theresa Randle; Nicol Williamson; D. B. Sweeney
- Cinematography: Guillermo Navarro
- Edited by: Rick Shaine; Michael N. Knue; Todd Busch
- Music by: Graeme Revell
- Production companies: New Line Cinema; Todd McFarlane Entertainment; Juno Pix; Pull Down Your Pants Pictures
- Distributed by: New Line Cinema
- Release date: August 1, 1997
- Running time: 96 minutes
- Country: United States
- Language: English
- Budget: $40–45 million
- Box office: $87.9 million

Spawn is a 1997 American superhero film based on the Image Comics character of the same name. Directed by Mark A.Z. Dippé from a script by Alan B. McElroy, the film stars Michael Jai White as the titular character, alongside John Leguizamo, Martin Sheen, Theresa Randle, D. B. Sweeney and Nicol Williamson in his final film role. Spawn is one of the first films to feature an African-American actor portraying a major comic book superhero. The film depicts the character's origin story as a murdered US Marine who returns from Hell as its army's reluctant leader. Spawn was released in the United States on August 1, 1997. It received generally negative reviews but was a box office success, grossing $87.9 million worldwide against a production budget between $40–45 million. A reboot, entitled King Spawn, is in development.

== Plot ==
U.S. Marine Corps Force Recon Lieutenant Colonel and CIA operative Al Simmons is assigned by his superior, Jason Wynn, to infiltrate a biochemical weapons plant in North Korea, despite Simmons' growing moral qualms with the nature of his work. Unknown to Simmons, Wynn has ordered his top assassin Jessica Priest to murder him while he is on the mission. Before Simmons dies, he is set on fire by Wynn as the plant explodes as well. Simmons arrives in Hell, where one of its rulers, Malebolgia, offers him a deal – if Simmons becomes his eternal servant and leader of his army in Armageddon, he will be able to return to Earth to see his wife, Wanda Blake. Simmons accepts the offer and is returned to Earth as a being known as a "Hellspawn".

Unfortunately, Simmons, now known as Spawn, learns that five years have passed since his death. Wanda is now married to his best friend Terry Fitzgerald, who is living as the stepfather to his daughter, Cyan. Spawn encounters a clown-like demon known as the Violator, sent by Malebolgia, who acts as his guide. Spawn also meets and befriends a young homeless boy named Zack and the mysterious and elderly Cogliostro, a former Hellspawn who has successfully freed his soul and now fights for Heaven. Spawn learns that Wynn is now a weapons dealer and has developed a biological weapon called Heat 16. During a reception, Spawn attacks Wynn, murders Jessica and escapes using his newfound powers as a Hellspawn.

Following the attack by Spawn, Violator convinces Wynn to have a device attached to his heart that will release Heat 16 worldwide if his vital signs flatline as a deterrent against assassination attempts; Malebolgia intends for Simmons to murder Wynn and initiate the apocalypse. Spawn confronts Violator, who enters his demonic form and beats him down. Cogliostro then rescues and teaches him how to use his powers with Zack. Spawn then learns that Violator and Wynn are after his family.

Terry sends an email incriminating Wynn to a fellow newsman. Just as the email is sent, Wanda, Cyan and Wynn enter the room. Wynn destroys Terry's computer and takes the family hostage. Spawn, Cogliostro and Zack arrive and nearly murder Wynn, but Spawn extracts the device from Wynn's body instead and destroys it. With his plan foiled, Violator sends Spawn and Cogliostro to Hell, where they both battle the demon before subduing him. Spawn is then confronted by Malebolgia as the latter renounces his intended purpose before escaping with Cogliostro just before they are overwhelmed by the villain's forces. Violator, having recovered, follows them, whereupon one last confrontation that culminates with Spawn decapitating the demon ensues. Violator's head taunts the group and threatens his return before retreating back to Hell. Wynn is arrested and Spawn, realizing there is no place for him in Wanda's world anymore, dedicates himself to justice rather than vengeance and returns to the streets with his allies.

== Cast ==
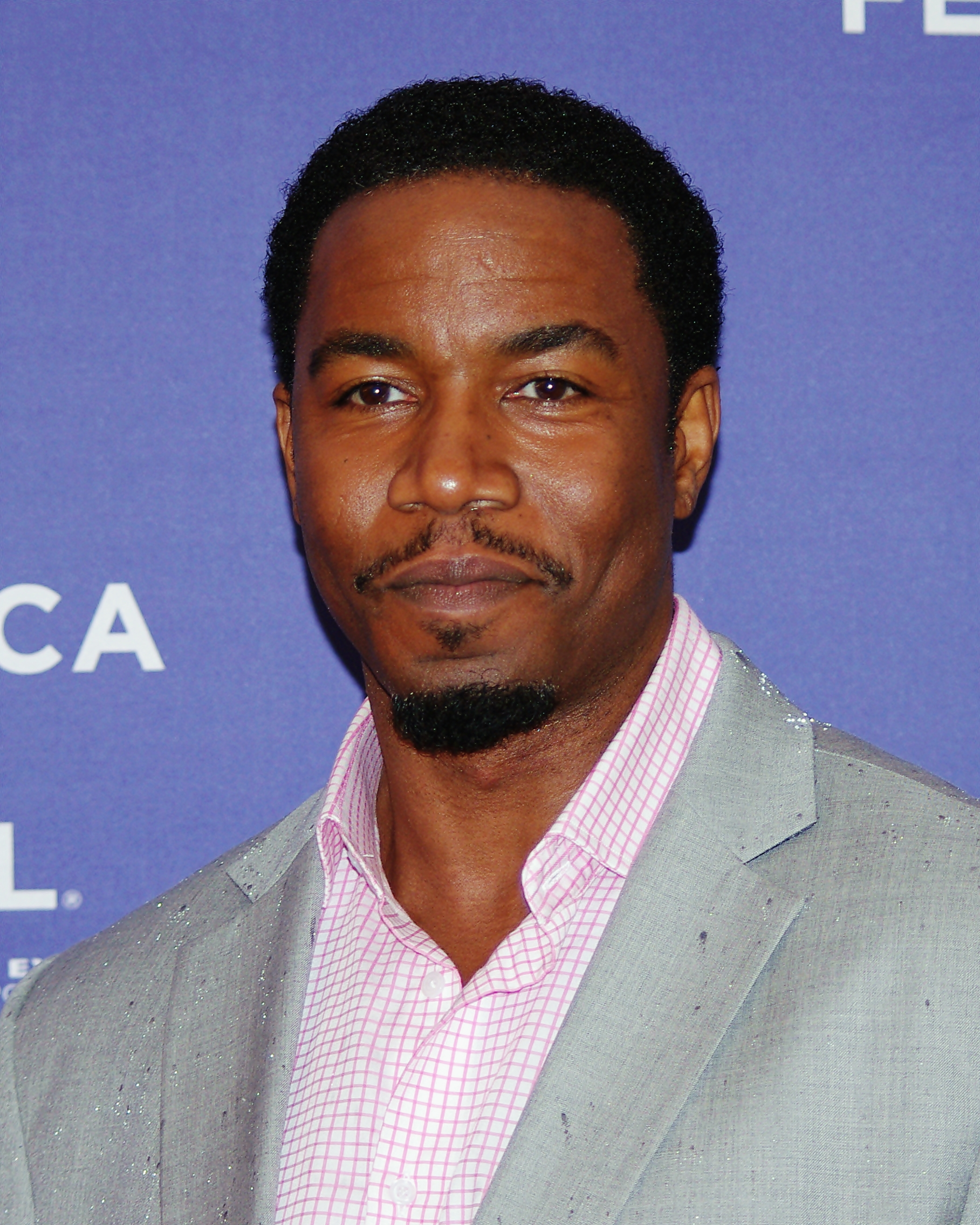
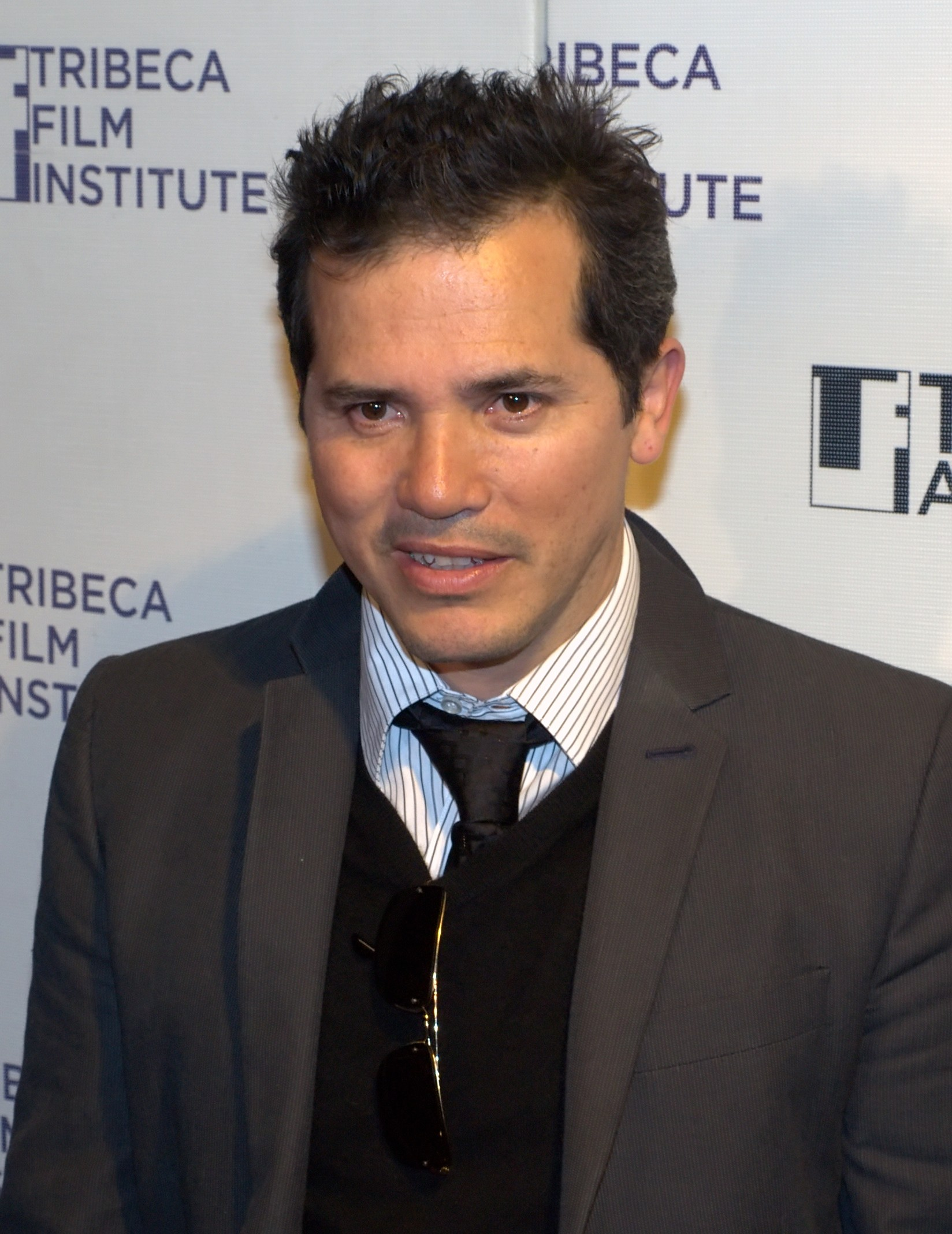
Michael Jai White (left) in 2012 and John Leguizamo (right) in 2010
- Michael Jai White as Albert Simmons / Spawn
- Nicol Williamson as Sir John of York / Cogliostro
- John Leguizamo as The Violator
- Martin Sheen as CIA Director Jason Wynn
- Melinda Clarke as CIA Agent Jessica Priest
- Theresa Randle as Wanda Blake
- D. B. Sweeney as CIA Agent Terry Fitzgerald
- Sydni Beaudoin as Cyan Simmons-Fitzgerald
- Miko Hughes as Zack
- Michael Papajohn as Glen, Zack's father
- Frank Welker as the voice of Malebolgia

Spawn creator Todd McFarlane makes a cameo appearance as a homeless man. The characters of Sam and Twitch appear in silent cameo appearances, portrayed by uncredited stand-ins. Angela, a character created by Neil Gaiman and McFarlane, makes a cameo appearance, played by Laura Interval.

== Production ==
Columbia Pictures showed interest in making a film adaptation of Spawn when the comic book was launched in 1992. Negotiations fell through as Todd McFarlane felt that the studio was not giving him enough creative control. He eventually sold the film rights to New Line Cinema for $1 in exchange for creative input and merchandising rights. New Line president Michael De Luca, a comic book collector himself, expressed interest in having "a character that has as established an audience as Spawn", while declaring that success hinged on an adaptation that "maintains a PG-13 rating but retains its darkness."

As visual effects were an important production concern, the film was to be produced by Pull Down Your Pants Pictures, a company formed by former Industrial Light & Magic artists Mark A.Z. Dippé, Clint Goldman and Steve 'Spaz' Williams. Dippé was slated to direct the film, with Goldman as producer, and Williams as second unit director and visual effects supervisor. Dippé and Williams, who at the time was the only one of the three still attached to ILM, called the film opportunity "our ticket out of the company". The script would be written by Alan B. McElroy, who, along with writing the Spawn comic book, also wrote many episodes of the Todd McFarlane's Spawn animated series.

Michael Jai White found Al Simmons' character appealing; he described Spawn as "the most tragic character I've encountered in any cinematic production." He says it was a challenge to make audiences sympathize with a government assassin who comes back from hell. White had to endure two to four hours of make-up work, including a full glued-on bodysuit, yellow contact lenses that irritated his eyes, and a mask that restricted his breathing. He said that his long-time experience with martial arts helped him to endure the uncomfortable prosthetics, giving him "strong will and unbreakable concentration." The makeup for John Leguizamo as Clown took eight hours to apply at first, but they later got the process down to about four hours. It left him with blisters and callouses on his face and neck. Leguizamo found the heavy prosthetics of his costume for the Clown to be claustrophobic, and the costume lacked any kind of a cooling system so he would sweat excessively. He compared the situation to wearing a full body condom.

Spawn was originally green-lit with a budget of $20 million. The scale of the visual effects led New Line to continually increase the project's budget, which grew to $40–45 million — a third of which was spent on the effects. The shooting schedule was only 63 days. To cut production time by a week, Goldman lent $1 million to engage John Grower's Santa Barbara Studios to develop the digitally produced Hell sequences. The visual effects shot count increased from 77 to over 400, created by 22 companies in the United States, Canada and Japan, requiring 70 people and nearly 11 months to complete. Industrial Light & Magic (ILM) did most of the work, creating 85 shots at a cost of $8.5 million. More than half of the final effects shots were delivered two weeks before the film's debut.

The most difficult sequences to render in the film included the Violator, Spawn's digital cape, and some of Spawn's transformations. Visual effects supervisor 'Spaz' Williams, with his previous experience of creating the T. Rex in Jurassic Park, was responsible for realizing the reptilian Violator. Working with KNB EFX Group over several months they created a small 24-inch reference model, as well as a full size 11-foot model for use in some of the practical shots. The small model was cut up and laser scanned, the data was then used by a team at ILM to create a digital armature of the creature, and to paint and give texture to the digital model. Only then could the character be animated, after which the work had to be converted to regular film stock. Further work was needed to integrate the footage with the rest of the scene, such as matching the lighting and grain of the other footage. The final shot of The Violator was delivered on July 21, 1997. A team at ILM supervised by Christopher Hery and Habib Zargarpour modelled, animated and rendered realistic looking robes, glass elements and a computer generated Spawn. Originally intended as one long shot, the scene was later recut and extended.

== Differences from the comic ==
Terry Fitzgerald, Al Simmons' best friend before his death, is black in the comics. In the film, he is white, portrayed by D. B. Sweeney. Todd McFarlane explained that this change was made by the studio to avoid having too many black leads, as they believed this would give the false impression that film's target audience was the African American demographic.

In the comics, Al Simmons' murderer is Chapel, a character created by Rob Liefeld for the comic Youngblood. Jessica Priest, a character created for the film, took Chapel's place in the movie. The comic book's storyline was later retconned so that original character, Jessica Priest, would take his place while Al's killer was Jason Wynn. Chapel's involvement was forgotten.

== Release ==
=== Theatrical ===
The original cut of Spawn earned an R rating from the Motion Picture Association of America resulting in the producers toning down the violence in the film to get a PG-13 rating.

=== Home media ===
The film was released on VHS on May 5, 1998 in a PG-13 version and an R-rated Director's Cut version, a "Making of Spawn" featurette, and an interview with Todd MacFarlane. The Director's Cut version was released on DVD on January 9, 1998 and on Blu-ray on July 10, 2012.

== Reception ==
=== Box office ===
Spawn was released on August 1, 1997. It grossed $19,738,749 that opening weekend, ranking it second behind Air Force One. For its second weekend, the film dropped to number three in the box office, reflecting a decreased earnings of 54.7% and a gross of $8,949,953. The film grossed $54.9 million in the United States and Canada and $32.9 million internationally, grossing $87.9 million worldwide against a production budget between $40–45 million.

=== Critical response ===
On Rotten Tomatoes the film has an approval rating of 17% based on 47 reviews, with an average rating of 3.9/10. The website's critics consensus states: "Spawn is an overbearing, over-violent film that adds little to the comic book adaptation genre." On Metacritic it has a weighted average score of 34 out of 100 based on 17 critics, indicating "generally unfavorable reviews". Audiences polled by CinemaScore gave the film an average grade of "C+" on an A+ to F scale.

One of the few positive reviews was from Roger Ebert of The Chicago Sun-Times, who awarded the film 3½ out of 4 stars. He wrote that the film's plot was "sappy" and little more than a set-up for some of the most innovative effects of the era, so much that Spawn verged on surrealistic art film. Ebert ended his review with, "As a visual experience, Spawn is unforgettable." Gene Siskel, his At the Movies co-host disagreed, and said the film lost him a mere two minutes after its introduction. Ebert praised the hellscape imagery and accused Siskel of being dismissive because of the genre, but having liked Batman, Siskel was unconvinced. David Kaplan of Newsweek called the film "the summer's most spectacular concoction of visual effects and color" but said that those unfamiliar with the comics might find the story difficult to follow.

Mick LaSalle of the San Francisco Chronicle criticized the weak story, and called the film a visual assault, "is all about style, which will appeal to some viewers and overwhelm most others". Of the cast LaSalle says only John Leguizamo stands out, his "zaniness seems in tune with the action" and he is "lucky enough to have a flashy part". Rita Kempley of The Washington Post calls the film a "muddled revenge fantasy" and criticizes the "nonsensical screenplay" and complains about the "thicket of narrative, punctuated by repetitive action sequences." Todd McCarthy writing for Variety magazine criticized the film for its over-reliance on special effects. He called it "narratively knuckleheaded", and disliked the scatological humor, and found the action sequences numbingly repetitive with "no compensatory narrative or thematic balance". McCarthy expected the younger male target-audience would enjoy the film, but that as the film is "loaded with effects at the expense of character or narrative coherence" it would be a turn-off for other viewers. Laura Miller of Salon.com called Spawn "a witless exercise in reheating leftovers". Miller called the comic character "a rehash of Spiderman [sic]" and the film a poor man's Batman. She declares "This movie sucks" and criticizes the special effects, compounded by the film taking itself too seriously. She is critical of the lack of dramatic structure, calling Spawn "a film helmed by technicians" and concludes that it is a film by "smart people pretending to be stupid".

Michael Jai White is not a fan of the film: "There is no footage of me ever saying that I liked Spawn. I have never said that I thought that was a good movie". John Leguizamo commented on the film: "The thing that Todd McFarlane brought to the comic book industry, which he saved in the early 1990s, was the edge. The darkness, the vulgarity, the violence. I think the movie would have profited for more violence, more vulgarity and being darker. Let it be truer to the comics."

=== Accolades ===
At the Saturn Awards, Spawn was nominated for Best Make-up. The film was also nominated for three Blockbuster Entertainment Awards for Favorite Male Newcomer (Michael Jai White), Favorite Horror Supporting Actor (John Leguizamo) and Favorite Horror Supporting Actress (Theresa Randle). At the Sitges - Catalan International Film Festival, Spawn was nominated for Best Film; the film was also nominated for & won the Best Special Effects award.

In January 2018, Complex magazine listed Spawn at number 2 out of 22, on its list of "The Best Black Superheroes In Movies".

== Soundtrack ==
Spawn: The Album

Soundtrack album by various artists
- Released: July 29, 1997
- Genres: Electronic rock; industrial rock; industrial metal; nu metal
- Length: 62:11
- Labels: Sony; Immortal; Epic
- Producers: Happy Walters; various

Immortal Records soundtrack series chronology
Judgment Night (1993)	Spawn: The Album (1997)	Immortal Electros (2002)

Singles from Spawn: The Album
- 1. "Long Hard Road Out of Hell" Released: July 22, 1997; 2. "(Can't You) Trip Like I Do" Released: October 7, 1997

Professional ratings
Review scores
Source	Rating
AllMusic	4/5 stars
Entertainment Weekly	(A) August 8, 1997
NME	6/10
Rolling Stone	August 21, 1997

Spawn: The Album was released in July 1997 and featured popular rock and metal group of bands at the time including: Metallica, Korn, Slayer, Marilyn Manson, Stabbing Westward, Filter, Soul Coughing, Silverchair and Mansun in collaborations with well-known electronica / techno producers such as The Crystal Method, Roni Size, The Prodigy, DJ Greyboy, Atari Teenage Riot, Moby, Orbital and 808 State. A similar concept was previously implemented on the rock/hip hop-infused Judgment Night soundtrack, and later, on the Blade II soundtrack, forming a trilogy of genre-blending soundtrack collections produced by Happy Walters.

The album debuted at #7 on the U.S. Billboard 200 and stayed on the chart for 25 weeks. The album is certified Gold in the United States, Australia and New Zealand, as well as Platinum in Canada.

The American version of the album features different cover art and the bonus track "This Is Not a Dream" by Morphine and Apollo 440. The Australian and Japanese versions, besides the bonus track, feature cover art based on images in Spawn #39 and a marquee of Spawn: In the Demon's Hand. The Japanese version contains a third disk with three remixes. The McFarlane Collector's Club made an LP release available to its members, featuring the standard album art and a translucent red vinyl disc. In 2017 a 20th Anniversary edition was released with a translucent blue vinyl disc.

"It was a bit rushed," declared The Prodigy's Liam Howlett of their collaboration with Rage Against the Machine guitarist Tom Morello. "I did it in three days when I usually need a week." In addition, Moby was originally slated to collaborate with industrial rock band Gravity Kills (titled "Suffocating"). Although he only contributed some samples and keyboard lines to the song, ultimately, he instead chose the final track with Butthole Surfers. The Gravity Kills recording would later be leaked online.

Spawn: The Album
No.	Title	Writer(s)	Producer(s)	Length
1.	"(Can't You) Trip Like I Do" (Filter & The Crystal Method)	The Crystal Method; Filter	The Crystal Method; Filter	4:30
2.	"Long Hard Road Out of Hell" (Marilyn Manson & Sneaker Pimps)	Marilyn Manson (lyrics); Twiggy Ramirez (music)	Marilyn Manson; Sean Beavan; Sneaker Pimps (co.)	4:21
3.	"Satan" (Orbital & Kirk Hammett)	Paul Hartnoll; Phil Hartnoll	P & P Hartnoll; Graeme Revell (add.)	3:45
4.	"Kick The P.A." (Korn & The Dust Brothers)	Korn; The Dust Brothers	The Dust Brothers; Korn	3:21
5.	"Tiny Rubberband" (Butthole Surfers & Moby)	Butthole Surfers; Richard Hall	Butthole Surfers	4:12
6.	"For Whom the Bell Tolls (The Irony of It All)" (Metallica & DJ Spooky)	James Hetfield; Lars Ulrich; Cliff Burton	Metallica; DJ Spooky (add.)	4:39
7.	"Torn Apart" (Stabbing Westward & Wink)	Stabbing Westward; Josh Wink	Stabbing Westward; Josh Wink	4:53
8.	"Skin Up Pin Up" (Mansun & 808 State)	Graham Massey; Andy Barker; Darren Partington; Paul Draper	Paul Draper; 808 State	5:27
9.	"One Man Army" (The Prodigy & Tom Morello)	Liam Howlett; Tom Morello	Liam Howlett	4:14
10.	"Spawn" (Silverchair & Vitro)	Daniel Johns; Ben Gillies	Silverchair; Vitro	4:28
11.	"T-4 Strain" (Henry Rollins & Goldie)	Goldie; Henry Rollins	Goldie; Rob Playford	5:19
12.	"Familiar" (Incubus & DJ Greyboy)	Brandon Boyd; Mike Einziger; Alex Katunich; Gavin Koppel; José Pasillas; Andreas Stevens	Jim Wirt	3:22
13.	"No Remorse (I Wanna Die)" (Slayer & Atari Teenage Riot)	Kerry King; Jeff Hanneman; Tom Araya; Alec Empire	Alec Empire	4:16
14.	"A Plane Scraped Its Belly on a Sooty Yellow Moon" (Soul Coughing & Roni Size)	Soul Coughing (music); Roni Size (music); Mike Doughty (lyrics)	Soul Coughing; Roni Size	5:26
15.	"This Is Not A Dream (The U.K. Mix)" (Morphine & Apollo 440) (Bonus track)			5:20
Total length:				67:33

=== Charts ===
Weekly charts
Chart (1997)	Peak position
Australian Albums (ARIA)	15
Austrian Albums (Ö3 Austria)	33
French Albums (SNEP)	43
German Albums (Offizielle Top 100)	38
Hungarian Albums (MAHASZ)	29
New Zealand Albums (RMNZ)	1
Dutch Albums (Album Top 100)	73
Norwegian Albums (VG-lista)	15
Scottish Albums (Official Charts)	46
UK Compilation Albums (Official Charts)	18
US Billboard 200	7
Chart (2024)	Peak position
UK Soundtrack Albums (Official Charts)	41

Year-end charts
Chart (1997)	Position
Australian Albums (ARIA)	95

Certifications
Region	Certification	Certified units/sales
Australia (ARIA)	Gold	35,000^{^}
Canada (Music Canada)	Platinum	100,000^{^}
New Zealand (RMNZ)	Gold	7,500^{^}
United States (RIAA)	Gold	500,000^{^}
^{^} Shipments figures based on certification alone.

== Legacy ==
Spawn is one of the first films to feature an African American actor portraying a major comic book superhero. Although preceded by other black superhero films such as The Meteor Man (1993), Spawn was the first to be based on a major comic book. Steel, starring basketball player Shaquille O'Neal based on a DC character, was also released later in the same month as Spawn. Writing in 2018, Barry Hertz of The Globe and Mail was critical of the fact that Michael Jai White was barely seen, and his face hidden by a mask or prosthetics. Unlike Blade (1998) which came later and was promoted based on the popularity of action star Wesley Snipes and happened to be based on a comic, Spawn was promoted based on the popularity of the McFarlane comic. Film critic Scott Mendelson says that Spawn and other films not only paved the way for films such as Black Panther but that success of Black Panther represents a return to the status quo.

== Unproduced sequel and reboot ==
A sequel, tentatively titled Spawn 2, has been in development hell since 1998. Producer Don Murphy maintained that he was part of the project in 2001. McFarlane stated that the film would have centered primarily on the detective characters Sam and Twitch, with Spawn only as a background character.

In 2007, McFarlane Funding announced development of a new feature film adaptation of the character, titled Spawn, scheduled for release in 2008. During an interview on the Scott Ferrall show on Sirius radio, McFarlane said: "It's coming out no matter what. Even if I have to produce, direct and finance it myself, it's going to come out."

On August 23, 2009, McFarlane announced that he had begun writing the screenplay for a new movie based on the character, saying that "The story has been in my head for 7 or 8 years", that "The movie idea is neither a recap or continuation. It is a standalone story that will be R-rated. Creepy and scary", and that "the tone of this Spawn movie will be for a more older audience. Like the film The Departed." In July 2011, Michael Jai White said that he was interested in returning to the role, expressing his support for McFarlane's film. In July 2013, Jamie Foxx said he was "aggressively pursuing" the Spawn reboot. In August 2013, McFarlane discussed his progress with the script, stating that the film would be "more of a horror movie and a thriller movie, not a superhero one".

In February 2016, McFarlane announced he had completed the film's script. In July 2017, Blumhouse Productions confirmed their involvement with the film, while announcing that McFarlane had also signed on to direct the project. The movie was expected to begin production by February 2018. In May 2018, it was announced that Jamie Foxx would portray the titular character. In July 2018, it was reported that Jeremy Renner would be starring alongside Foxx as Detective Twitch. On October 25, 2018, the filming start date was delayed to June 2019. The film ended up missing its start date. In November 2019, the film restarted development due to the financial success of the R-rated comic book film Joker. In December 2019, McFarlane hired an additional writer to help polish the script, before presenting it to a major Hollywood studio. In March 2020, McFarlane stated Spawn will go into production sometime in 2020 with the intention for him to direct and Jamie Foxx still attached for the lead role. In May 2020, producer Jason Blum stated that "There has been an enormous amount of activity on Spawn......But, suffice to say, it is a very active development." In August 2021, it was revealed that Broken City screenwriter Brian Tucker had been hired to rewrite McFarlane's screenplay. In October 2022, Scott Silver, Malcolm Spellman, and Matthew Mixon had been hired to rewrite the screenplay. In June 2023, it was reported that the film was in "very very active development" , with an estimated release date in 2025. In September 2023, McFarlane stated that the screenplay was almost finished before work was halted by the Writers Guild of America strike. In January 2024, McFarlane stated that the year was considered a "make or break" year for the film, revealing that he had assembled a group of investors to fund it independently if he was unable to have a major studio acquire the project. In July 2024, McFarlane revealed that the screenplay was finished, that they were now looking for a director, and that the film's title would be King Spawn. In July 2025, McFarlane stated that they were close to signing an "A-list" director and that they were waiting to share any news until the script was complete and a studio had acquired the project.

== See also ==
- List of American films of 1997
- List of live-action films based on cartoons and comics
