= Stripper Vicar =

"Stripper Vicar (Three EP)"

Single by Mansun

from the album Attack of the Grey Lantern
- Released: 9 September 1996 (UK); 23 October 1996 (Japan)
- Recorded: 1996
- Genre: Pop
- Length: 4:10
- Label: Parlophone
- Songwriter: Paul Draper

Mansun singles chronology
""Take It Easy Chicken" (Two EP)" (1996)	"Stripper Vicar (Three EP)" (1996)	"Wide Open Space" (1996)

"Stripper Vicar" is a song by Chester rock band Mansun released in 1996. It was the lead track of Three EP and was the band's fifth release overall. The single was the group's first with the group's new drummer, Andie Rathbone. The EP became Mansun's first top twenty hit peaking at #19 on the UK Singles Chart. Three EP was released on Two CDs, and 7" Vinyl. "Stripper Vicar" and "An Open Letter To The Lyrical Trainspotter" were included on the group's début album, though the single was left off US editions.

In Japan the majority of the Three EP was compiled with three tracks from the group's earlier Two EP release under the title Special Mini Album (Japan Only EP).

== Track listing ==
All tracks are written by Paul Draper.

Limited edition clear 7" vinyl
No.	Title	Length
1.	"Stripper Vicar"	4:10
2.	"No One Knows Us"	3:41

CD part one (Includes a free poster)
No.	Title	Length
1.	"Stripper Vicar"	4:10
2.	"The Edge"	3:15
3.	"The Duchess"	4:28

CD part two
No.	Title	Length
1.	"Stripper Vicar"	4:10
2.	"An Open Letter To The Lyrical Trainspotter"	4:01
3.	"No One Knows Us"	3:41
4.	"Things Keep Falling Off Buildings"	4:19

CD: Special Mini Album (Japan Only EP)
No.	Title	Length
1.	"Stripper Vicar"	4:10
2.	"An Open Letter To The Lyrical Trainspotter"	4:01
3.	"No One Knows Us"	3:41
4.	"The Edge"	3:15
5.	"The Duchess"	4:28
6.	"Take It Easy Chicken"	4:30
7.	"Drastic Sturgeon"	3:23
8.	"Moronica"	4:32

== Personnel ==
Mansun

- Dominic Chad - Guitar, Backing Vocals
- Paul Draper - Vocals, Guitar
- Andie Rathbone - Drums
- Stove - Bass

Production

- Mike Hunter - Engineering Assistance ("Stripper Vicar", "Things Keep Falling Off Buildings")
- Ronnie Stone - Engineering ("Stripper Vicar", "Things Keep Falling Off Buildings")
- Clif Norrell - Mixing ("Stripper Vicar", "Things Keep Falling Off Buildings")
- Ian Caple - Engineering (all tracks) and Mixing ("The Edge", "The Duchess", "An Open Letter To The Lyrical Trainspotter", "No One Knows Us")

== Chart positions ==
Chart (1996)	Peak position
UK Singles Chart	19
Scottish Singles Chart	25
