= Joe Fenton (artist) =

- Born: Jonathan Simon Bramley-Fenton; Hampstead, London, England
- Education: Wimbledon College of Art
- Known for: Drawing, illustrating, sculpting
- Spouse: Iji Asfaw-Fenton

Jonathan "Joe" Simon Bramley-Fenton is an English artist, designer, sculptor and illustrator, who works in monochrome using graphite, ink and acrylics on paper. He has worked on a number of feature films as a concept designer and sculptor, including The Brothers Grimm directed by Terry Gilliam and The Hitchhiker's Guide to the Galaxy directed by Garth Jennings.

== Career ==
Fenton has illustrated two children's picture books: What's Under the Bed? (published in 2008) and Boo! (published in 2010) by Simon & Schuster.

In 2014, he was commissioned to create a one-of-a-kind guitar for PRS Guitars signature artist (and lead guitarist of rock bands Creed and Alter Bridge) Mark Tremonti.

Fenton also produces and directs short films showing his art process, such as The Lullaby (2011) and Flight (2014).

== Background ==
Fenton has a Bachelor of Arts (Hons) in Sculpture from the Wimbledon College of Art.
