= Skin Up Pin Up / Flourella =

1995 single by Mansun

Single by Mansun
- Released: 20 November 1995
- Studio: Angel Share (London, England); Ewloe (North Wales)
- Length: 3:42 (A); 4:23 (AA)
- Label: Regal
- Songwriter(s): Paul Draper
- Producer(s): Paul Draper

Mansun singles chronology
"Take It Easy Chicken" (1995)	"Skin Up Pin Up / Flourella" (1995)	"Egg Shaped Fred" (1996)

"Skin Up Pin Up" and "Flourella" are two songs by English alternative rock band Mansun. The songs were written and produced by band-leader Paul Draper. "Skin Up Pin Up" was recorded in London during the group's first recording session and "Flourella" during the group's second recording session in Ewloe, North Wales. The single was released as a double A-side on white 7-inch vinyl and CD and charted at number 91 on the UK Singles Chart.

Both songs were later reworked and re-released in 1997. "Flourella" was rerecorded and remixed for inclusion on the group's debut album, though was dropped and instead appeared on the "She Makes My Nose Bleed" single. "Skin Up Pin Up" was remixed by British electronic music group 808 State and released on the superhero action film soundtrack Spawn: The Album on 29 July 1997.

== Track listing ==
All tracks are written by Paul Draper

UK white 7-inch vinyl and CD
No.	Title	Length
1.	"Skin Up Pin Up"	3:42
2.	"Flourella"	4:23

== Personnel ==
Mansun

- Paul Draper – vocals, electric guitar, bass, keyboards, programming
- Dominic Chad – backing vocals, electric guitar
- Stove – bass

Production

- Paul Draper – producer
- Ronnie Stone – engineering
- Mike Hunter – engineering ("Flourella")
- Ian Caple – engineering ("Flourella")

== Charts ==
Chart (1995)	Peak position
UK Singles (OCC)	91
