= Pennie Smith =

English photographer

Pennie Smith MBE
- Born: about 1949; London, England
- Education: Twickenham Art School
- Occupation: Photographer

Pennie Smith MBE (born in London) is an English photographer, known for her photography of the rock music industry. She specialises in black-and-white photography.

== Early life ==
Smith attended art school in Twickenham in the late 1960s, studying graphics and fine art. With others, she collaborated with graphic designer Barney Bubbles and music journalist Nick Kent in producing Friends magazine from 1969 to 1972. In 1970 she designed the sleeve for the Pink Fairies debut release Never Never Land.

== Career ==
Smith's first major photographic commission was to cover a 1970s Led Zeppelin tour. She went on to work at the NME as staff photographer until the early 1980s.

In her career Smith has photographed some well-known rock musicians, including: Led Zeppelin, the Rolling Stones, the Who, Iggy Pop, Sweet, the Clash, the Jam, the Slits, Siouxsie Sioux, Debbie Harry, U2, Morrissey, the Stone Roses, Primal Scream, Manic Street Preachers, Radiohead, Blur, Oasis, David Smith and the Strokes.

In addition to her portrait work she has covered tours with musicians, including a photograph of the Clash's Paul Simonon smashing his bass guitar on the stage in New York City during a 1979 tour. The photograph went on to be used on the cover of the Clash album London Calling, designed by Ray Lowry, and received Q magazine's "Greatest Rock 'n’ Roll Photograph of All-Time" award in 2002.

Smith's work has appeared on the covers and pages of the NME, on album sleeves, promotional material and has featured in books. Her book The Clash, Before and After was published in 1980; it proved to be a bestseller.

In 2002, Smith received the award for "Godlike Genius" (the NME's name for its Lifetime Achievement award) at the NME Awards.

In late 2009, multiple images by Smith were included in the "Who Shot Rock & Roll" exhibition of rock photography at the Brooklyn Museum.

In January 2010, Smith's London Calling image was issued on a postage stamp by the Royal Mail.

Smith currently lives and works in a disused railway station in west London, which she bought and converted into a studio while she was a student, and freelances in black-and-white reportage photography. The railway station 'doubles as a secondhand bookstore', the Osterley Bookshop. Sadly this closed in January 2025.

In the 2024 King's Birthday Honours, Smith was appointed a Member of the Order of the British Empire, for services to photography.

== See also ==
- Tony Mott
