= Mansun =

English alternative rock band (1995–2003)

- Origin: Chester, England
- Genres: Alternative rock, Britpop
- Years active: 1995–2003
- Labels: Sci-Fi Hi-Fi; Regal; Parlophone; Epic
- Past members: Paul Draper; Dominic Chad; Stove King; Andie Rathbone; Carlton Hibbert; Mark Swinnerton; Julian Fenton
- Website: mansun.co.uk

Mansun were an English alternative rock band, formed in Chester in 1995. The band comprised vocalist/rhythm guitarist Paul Draper, bassist Stove King, lead guitarist/backing vocalist Dominic Chad, and drummer Andie Rathbone.

It was announced in May 2003 that the band had split up earlier that year, whilst in the process of recording their fourth album, and some of their archival recording of the album later released on their final album, Kleptomania (2004).

== History ==
=== Formation ===
Paul Draper and Stove King met in the early 1990s, whilst working in the printing industry as photo retouchers for rival companies situated opposite each other on the same industrial park in Little Stanney on the outskirts of Chester. Through their shared love of David Bowie and 1980s new wave bands including Duran Duran and ABC they started socialising together at weekends, going to gigs in Liverpool and playing along to drum loops together in their bedrooms with the desire of forming a band together. Whilst King was a relative newcomer to playing bass, Draper had previously formed and fronted the electronic duo Grind whilst studying at Thames Polytechnic (now University of Greenwich), with programmer-keyboard player Steve Heaton, and were often accompanied live by school friend Carlton Hibbert on drums.

Grind released one 12" single in 1991 on the small "Whats in It For Me Records" label and gigged around London at venues such as The Rock Garden and The Brain and also supported Beverley Craven at the Mean Fiddler. Following the split of Grind, Draper, funded by a grant from The Prince's Trust, set up a music company called "Ambiance Productions" producing relaxation tapes to be sold in "hippie shops" across the north west of England. In early 1995 Draper and King enlisted Maidstone expat Dominic Chad, who was the bar manager at the Fat Cat pub on Watergate Street in Chester opposite the office where Draper would go and see former Grind member Steve Heaton. Chad had previously played with "Floating Bear" formed whilst at Bangor University in 1990, where he had been studying French and Russian but was kicked off the course due to lack of effort. Chad would later admit that his routine during university was "get up at three, go down to the union bar at four and stay there until it shut".

With the aid of a drum machine, the trio began rehearsing at Crash Rehearsal Studios in Liverpool, where the band were quickly discovered by passing A&R scouts Mark Lewis and Alan Wills (who later went on to form Deltasonic Records) who were there to see Cast and overheard the band through their rehearsal room door. The band were offered a publishing contract with Polygram Music Publishing four days after reluctantly handing over a demo tape of 4 songs that cost £150 to record featuring "Take It Easy Chicken", "Skin Up Pin Up", "Moronica" and "She Makes My Nose Bleed".

=== Early days (1995–96) ===
The band were initially called Grey Lantern, after Draper's DC Comics influenced alter ego which he created to help overcome his nervousness on stage, but soon changed their name to "Manson", after the cult leader Charles Manson. The band's self-financed debut release "Take It Easy Chicken" in September 1995 on their own "Sci-Fi Hi-Fi Recordings" label soon attracted the attention of BBC Radio 1 DJs Steve Lamacq and John Peel and the band found themselves, despite not having played a single gig and later admitting that they couldn't play together as a band very well at the time, at the centre of a record label bidding war. This resulted in the band signing to Parlophone, with whom they released the follow-up single "Skin Up Pin Up / Flourella" in November 1995 on sublabel Regal Recordings, although this time under the new moniker "Mansun" as they were forced to change the spelling due to threatened legal action from the Charles Manson Estate. The band gave several false accounts of this at the time, one being that they were named after The Verve B-side "A Man Called Sun", and that "Manson" was simply a spelling mistake which accidentally went through to production. It was later reported that Charles Manson had started spelling his name with a "u", to which Draper joked that they should sue him in return.

Following the release of "Skin Up Pin Up / Flourella", the band were moved up to the main Parlophone label and released several EPs, including an expanded re-release of the debut single. The first lineup of the band alongside Draper, King and Chad had featured former Grind drummer Carlton Hibbert and drum machine programmer Mark Swinnerton. Following five months of touring, starting with the band's first gig in August 1995 at The Lomax in Liverpool and support gigs with Heavy Stereo and The Charlatans, Swinnerton left the band in January 1996. As a four piece, the band continued touring including support gigs with Cast, Audioweb and Shed Seven until Hibbert was fired from the band in May 1996 following a series of rows with an inebriated Chad that resulted in a bizarre incident that involved a pineapple being thrown at Chad's face in Cambridge, where the band were supporting Shed Seven. Throughout the early days of the band, Chad was involved in a string of violent alcohol fuelled incidents. These included punching his own reflection in a hotel mirror, being thrown out of a pub after attempting to drop kick the bar, throwing pint glasses out of a window in Sheffield, getting himself banned along with the rest of the band from every outlet of the now defunct roadside restaurant chain Happy Eater, all Hard Rock Cafes worldwide and every Holiday Inn hotel in the UK after drop kicking a statue of the Venus de Milo. Ex-Kinky Machine drummer Julian Fenton was temporarily drafted in for gigs and featured in the promo videos for "Take It Easy Chicken" and "Stripper Vicar".

In August 1996 Andie Rathbone joined, a well known drummer in Chester who had been playing regularly with several bands including DNA Cowboys, The Wandering Quatrains and Jonti. Having auditioned several drummers without success, the band took a break at a local pub where "there was the best rock drummer we'd ever seen, playing with this really dodgy band", but the drummer, who was also working as an Audi car salesman at the time, initially rejected the band's pleas to join the band, as he thought the band played "Britpop shite". He changed his mind after King played him a demo of one of the band's latest songs, "Wide Open Space". Rathbone's first gig with the band was performing "Stripper Vicar" live on TFI Friday, having missed the previous nights gig in Brighton due to getting a train to Bristol Temple Meads by mistake and having to check the gig guide in the NME to find out where the gig was.

=== Attack of the Grey Lantern (1997) ===
February 1997 saw the release of the band's critically acclaimed debut album Attack of the Grey Lantern. Although the band had finished recording most of the album prior to Rathbone joining, they went back into the studio to record new songs "Taxloss" and "Mansun's Only Love Song" and re-record several drum tracks. The album appeared to contain a conceptual storyline, which Draper referred to as "small town weirdo observations" and was influenced by comedies The Goon Show and Monty Python, whilst ending with a hidden track, "An Open Letter to the Lyrical Trainspotter", proclaiming (reportedly sarcastically) that "the lyrics aren't supposed to mean that much". The album knocked labelmates Blur's self-titled album from the top spot of the UK albums chart after only being released the week before.

During the early days of the band, Mansun were noted and sometimes derided for their constantly changing fashion styles. Such styles ranged from punk, new romantic, baggy "Madchester" clothes, army fatigues, A Clockwork Orange style boiler suits and even women's clothing. Draper admitted that it was "probably overenthusiasm, seeing people like Bowie's different guises and thinking, 'Great! Let's try that.'"

=== Six (1998–99) ===
Following the release of the standalone "Closed for Business" EP in October 1997, the band found themselves short of songs going into the studio sessions at Olympic Studios for second album Six. Suffering from writer's block, Draper took inspiration from books Chad had taken out with him on tour, such as 120 Days of Sodom by Marquis de Sade, The House at Pooh Corner by A. A. Milne, and Dianetics: The Modern Science of Mental Health by L. Ron Hubbard, by quickly scanning them to get the gist of the books and then forming lyrics based on them. Many of the musical ideas were assembled during soundchecks on the previous US tour. Chad admitted that the band "had all these ideas that we came up with on tour, but we didn't have any complete songs. For the album, we simply recorded all the musical snippets, and then figured out key and tempo changes that would link the sections together". With the lack of complete songs going into the album sessions, Draper set out to put together enough material at the weekends in the band's rented accommodation in Barnes so that there was enough material each week for the band to work on.

Through constant touring, the band were now confident to record as a band in the studio and set out to replicate their live sound and make the album heavier and more guitar based in contrast to the more commercial sounding drum loop and synthesiser based sound of the debut. On the Chad penned "Witness to Murder Part II", the band enlisted former Doctor Who actor Tom Baker to perform the monologue, with King admitting that "the whole band are big fans of Doctor Who and Tom Baker, so we thought he'd be ideal. Tom heard the track and immediately agreed to perform on it". The track was intended as an interlude between two sides of the album, as if it was a vinyl record, but Chad later stated he regretted putting it on the album. The original idea was to package the CD version of the album in a 12" gatefold sleeve to replicate the vinyl experience, but was abandoned due to possible issues with getting it stocked by retailers.

The album was preceded by the singles "Legacy", which provided the band with the highest-charting single, and "Being a Girl". Several more singles followed the release of the album, including "Negative" and a re-recording of the album's title track, "Six" produced by Arthur Baker. Draper later admitted to placing the two main singles at the end of the album to be awkward, and tried to avoid having choruses on the album, leaving many of those tracks to be released as b-sides, which he thought would have made a better rock album. He described the album as being "commercial suicide".

=== Little Kix (2000) ===
Mansun's third studio album, Little Kix (early working titles included Magnetic Poetry and The Trouble With Relationships,) saw Draper and Chad decamp to the south of Spain in March 1999 where they wrote and demo'd ideas for the album. Draper claimed that following the commercial and critical disappointment of Six, he didn't feel any pressure to follow it up and therefore set out to go in a different direction with the new album. Prior to the writing trip in Spain, he had decided that the new album would be more "acoustic-guitary" and wanted to prove to himself that he could still write pop songs with choruses. The album was recorded at Astoria, a houseboat-studio owned by Pink Floyd guitarist David Gilmour, with former XTC and Police producer Hugh Padgham.

Despite initially admitting that the album was "all about 'What do you want out of your life, what do you want out of a relationship?' And I didn't want to make another disillusioned, really dark record", and that "anyone who gets Little Kix knows it's a good album" Draper refused to tour or promote the album. "I Can Only Disappoint U" gave the band their biggest selling single to date and second highest charting single after "Legacy", but Draper's refusal to promote the album led to the album stalling at No. 14 in the chart. He later admitted that whilst they were trying to make a "timeless record", he "just don't think we realised the record we were making until towards the end" and Chad also later stated that the album "just didn't sound like us because there was lots of keyboards".

Several years following the split of the band, Draper claimed that he was demoted as the band's producer as the rest of the band were no longer comfortable with him producing and the label reportedly wanted to ensure the band didn't go off on another tangent as with Six, and was forced to work with an outside producer for the first time, stating that "the management wanted a soft rock album made behind my back for some reason and I got manipulated into releasing it" and that the band were "steamrollered into doing a commercial sounding 3rd album".

=== Aborted fourth album and split (2001–2003) ===
In January 2001, prior to the final single "Fool" being released off Little Kix, Draper informed the NME that the band were set to enter the studio in March or April of that year and that the band wanted to release new material as soon as possible. In April, Draper told fans through the official website that the band had recorded and mixed eight new songs and would continue recording in May. The band were considering their options as to whether to release an EP or to hold the material back for a full album. In August, Chad posted on the band's official website to inform fans that the band had abandoned plans for an EP and were now halfway through recording their fourth album, which would be "harder" than Little Kix and that they planned to release a single in December. The band's aim for the record was to make it as representative of Mansun as a live band as possible, that it sounded "like a live band playing in a room" but also that it had all the "creative sounds that Six had". In October 2001 the Mansun ansaphone service operated by King since the early days of the band went down. In March 2002 and with no sign of new material, it was claimed that the delay in the new album being finished was due to Chad's injuring his hand after falling into a fire grate, keeping him from playing for four to five months, but confirmed that the band had so far finished 15 songs.

Draper later revealed that he had been diagnosed with cancer during recording sessions at Rockfield Studios, after a blister appeared on his left hand middle finger that kept bleeding. He visited a local doctor who took a sample of tissue from the finger. It was confirmed that it was malignant and was known as a "Bowenoid malignancy," and Draper responded positively to five cycles of chemotherapy. However, he was unable to play for several months after his finger swelled up following treatment

In April and May 2002 the band embarked on a low-key UK tour, which was initially planned to be secret and promoted under the pseudonym The Masons. The band played short ten song sets on the tour, one half old songs and the other half new songs set to appear on their forthcoming album. One website prophetically reported that the tour would be the band's last, although this was denied at the time.

In the following October, Chad revealed that a planned studio session for that month had been abandoned as they had wanted to continue writing. Following extended delays in the band delivering the new album to Parlophone, rumour spread in December 2002 that the band had been given an ultimatum that if they didn't complete the album by early in the new year, they would be dropped. In January 2003, a posting on the band's official Yahoo list claimed that a member of the band had left "amid massive animosity", later elaborating that "a member of the band had quit, did not want to rejoin and the remaining members did not want him back" and that as a result of this, the band had split up.

Following months of speculation, the band's split was officially announced on 2 May 2003, with the press release stating that the band decided to call it a day after realising that "the life of the group had come to an end". Chad commented on the split, that "there's nothing sinister behind it, it was completely amicable. We all just want to be able to do other things". It was later revealed that the announcement had been delayed as Draper had unexpectedly fled to the US with no fixed date of return and that it was Stove King's departure from the band that had resulted in the band splitting.

Despite Chad having proclaimed the new material to be their best work yet, incorporating elements of all the band's previous albums and praising Draper's writing as being better than ever, Draper later claimed that when working on the new album, none of the band's hearts were in it and in 2008 went on to blame Chad for the split, stating that the guitarist "wasn’t happy with the working method of writing and recording, but didn’t want to implement his own writing and recording method so we simply had to go home and end the band". Rathbone described the album as being "the first album that captured an essence of the live sound", but also that the sessions were frustrating and revealed that towards the end, the band had split into two camps - himself and King who still resided in Chester, and Draper and Chad who had moved to Weybridge, Surrey.

In September 2015, Draper went on to further claim that Chad tried to sack him from the band several times following the release of Little Kix. He stated that Chad "didn’t want me to be the producer or the songwriter and he wanted me replaced by another singer and for the band to be more like The Seahorses, remember that band with John Squire? He wanted the songs to come out of jams in rehearsal rooms". Further commenting on the band's split, Draper claimed that "one or two members did way too many drugs and a lot of people interfering, it wasn’t handled properly and it ended in disaster".

In March 2023, Dominic Chad announced via social media that "since late 2006 I have tried to have no contact with Paul Draper and he has failed to respect that on numerous occasions. I must state publicly that it is my choice to have nothing to do with him; he is not welcome to engage with me, my family or friends or continue to try contacting me through my place of work". He also revealed that he had requested that Kscope, the label that currently owns the rights to the Mansun catalogue, remove his image and name from any and all future Mansun releases and that the label had confirmed they will do their best to comply with his request.

=== Kleptomania and other releases (2004–present) ===
With news of the split being confirmed and with the knowledge that most of the fourth album, which was set to be self titled, had already been recorded, an online petition was set up by fans to persuade Parlophone to release the material. The tracks intended for the album were then released in September 2004, along with the non-album singles and a selection of B-sides (compiled by Draper from a top 20 voted for by fans on the band's official website) and rarities in a 3 CD box set entitled Kleptomania. Draper later claimed that after Parlophone contacted him to ask whether he wanted to be involved in putting together the album sessions for release, he tried to reform the band to properly finish it but no one else was interested.

Legacy - The Best of Mansun was released in September 2006, with a limited edition CD/DVD release also issued containing promo videos for every single plus a documentary and other bonus material. The CD also provided access to download the previously unreleased "South of the Painted Hall", which was originally set for release on Kleptomania, but the multitrack was incomplete, missing the lead vocal. The free download version is sourced from a reference CD-R which featured a rough mix with a guide vocal.

In March 2008, on the prospect of a Mansun reunion, Draper stated that whilst he and Andie Rathbone were interested, "Dominic Chad would never do it, so it can't happen". In 2010, Rathbone commented that it was a "pity the three others couldn't stop dramatising the problems and get out again, as we'd be phenomenal". In 2011 Rathbone again confirmed his and Draper's desire to reform the band, but added that a reunion would have to include all four band members and that neither King nor Chad were interested.

An article in The Guardian on 24 December 2011, entitled "The Guide's guide to the next 12 months", claimed that the band were set to reunite in 2012 with a new album planned, but was later denied by official sources and confirmed to be a mistake by the article's author.

=== Solo activity ===
Following the split, Draper worked with ex-Skunk Anansie singer Skin on songs for her Gordon Raphael produced album Fake Chemical State, and recorded demos for artists such as Komakino and Catherine A.D. In 2009 he worked with The Joy Formidable on their free download-only single "Greyhounds in the Slips". In 2007 Draper began working with singer-songwriter Catherine A.D, he has produced and co-written songs on her debut album which was due for release under the name The Anchoress in 2014.

In 2013, Draper said that he was working on solo material since the band split and was not opposed to releasing the songs he has recorded as a solo artist if people are interested in hearing them. In light of this, a petition was set up on Facebook where fans could show support by 'liking' the page. Draper responded to the petition and spoke of how he and DJ Marc Riley were literally overwhelmed with emails of support and questions about his unreleased project, following an appearance on BBC Radio 6 Music in October. He stated in November 2013 that he was giving the matter of releasing solo material some "very serious consideration". In 2016, Draper released his first solo single, and his debut full album release, Spooky Action, was released in August 2017.

Rathbone formed the short-lived Seraphim with Jonti Thackray with whom he was in a band with prior to joining Mansun and has continued working with bands including The Jokers, Amsterdam, Blondie tribute band "Into The Bleach" and Chester supergroup World Upside Down. Rathbone also set up a mobile drum teaching service.

Neither Chad nor King have been involved in the music industry since the split. In the press release for Kleptomania, Draper claimed that he had started writing with Chad again, but later admitted that he had only been helping him build up backing tracks and had stopped turning up to the sessions anyway. In 2005 it was revealed Chad was involved with the Nordoff Robbins Music Therapy charity and was also rumoured to be working in a care home and later a driver for St. John Ambulance in London. King had reportedly begun a career in Speedway racing.

A new official Mansun website was launched in January 2017, honouring the band's back catalogue and legacy. Vinyl reissues and expanded CD sets of ”Attack of the Grey Lantern" and "Six" were released in 2018 and 2019, respectively.

== Members ==
- Paul Draper – lead vocals, guitars, keyboards (1995–2003)
- Stove King – bass (1995–2002)
- Dominic Chad – guitars, keyboards, piano, backing vocals (1995–2003)
- Carlton Hibbert – drums (1995–1996)
- Mark Swinnerton – drum machine, programming (1995–1996)
- Julian Fenton – drums (1996)
- Andie Rathbone – drums (1996–2003)

== Discography ==
- Attack of the Grey Lantern (1997)
- Six (1998)
- Little Kix (2000)
- Kleptomania (2004)
