= Andie Rathbone =

English drummer (born 1969)

- Born: Andrew Rathbone; 8 September 1969 (age 56); Chester, England
- Genres: Alternative rock
- Occupation: Musician
- Instruments: Drums, percussion
- Years active: 1996–present
- Label: Parlophone

Andrew "Andie" Rathbone (born 8 September 1969) is an English drummer and former member of the alternative rock band Mansun.

Rathbone grew up in Blacon, Chester and played in various local bands including "The Wandering Quatrains" and "Jonti" and "The DNA Cowboys". Having studied at Tech Music School in Fulham, London, he attracted the interest of Mansun with his playing and flamboyant look. Rathbone initially turned the band down due to commitments with "The DNA Cowboys" and because he thought they played "Britpop shite". Also working as an Audi Car salesman at the time, he later had a change of heart after the band's bass player Stove King played him a demo of their new song "Wide Open Space".

Rathbone joined Mansun shortly before their debut album Attack of the Grey Lantern was finished. He was the third and final drummer in the band, brought in after the band had "internal conflict" with the previous members. Rathbone's initiation into the band was not without mishap; arriving for his first live gig with the band, flicking through a copy of NME for details, Rathbone found he had got the wrong train and instead of the correct destination of Brighton, he had in fact arrived at Bristol Temple Meads. Shortly after, his first proper gig with the band was a televised appearance on Channel 4 show, TFI Friday, where the band performed "Stripper Vicar". The band released three studio album before splitting in 2003 whilst recording their fourth. Material from those session was released in 2004 as part of the Kleptomania boxset.

Following the breakup of Mansun, Rathbone formed Seraphim with Jonti Thackray with whom he had been in bands with prior to Mansun, and has since played with several artists including Blondie tribute band Into the Bleach, The Jokers and World Upside Down. In 2013, he performed with folk band Green Smoke Hokum Band with accordion busker, Russell Mabbutt and soul-funk band Indio's Dream playing the percussive cajón instrument.

In 2008, Rathbone launched Rhythm Rehab, a short lived mobile drum teaching service covering Cheshire, Shropshire and North Wales.
