= Stove King =

English bassist (born 1974)

- Born: Steven William King; 8 January 1974 (age 52); Ellesmere Port, Cheshire, England
- Genres: Alternative rock
- Occupation: Musician
- Instrument: Bass guitar
- Years active: 1995–2002
- Label: Parlophone

Steven William "Stove" King (born 8 January 1974 in Ellesmere Port, Cheshire) is an English musician, formerly the bassist for the alternative rock band Mansun.

King formed Mansun with Paul Draper, with whom he shared an interest in graphic design. His first bass was an Aria Pro, which he bought to rehearse with Draper – the pair would play along to drum loops in their bedrooms. Having not picked up an instrument prior to the formation of Mansun, King went on to become a solid bass player, with Bassist Magazine commenting in 1997 that despite being a relative newcomer to the instrument and being self-deprecating in interviews, "Stove and Mansun drummer Andie Rathbone have formed a pretty solid bond in the rhythm department".

King left the band in late 2002 after several recording sessions for the album that was eventually released as Kleptomania, leading to the band's split.

It is said that the nickname Stove comes from a typo on his birth certificate, which read "Stove" instead of "Steve".
