= Paul Draper (musician) =

English musician (born 1970)

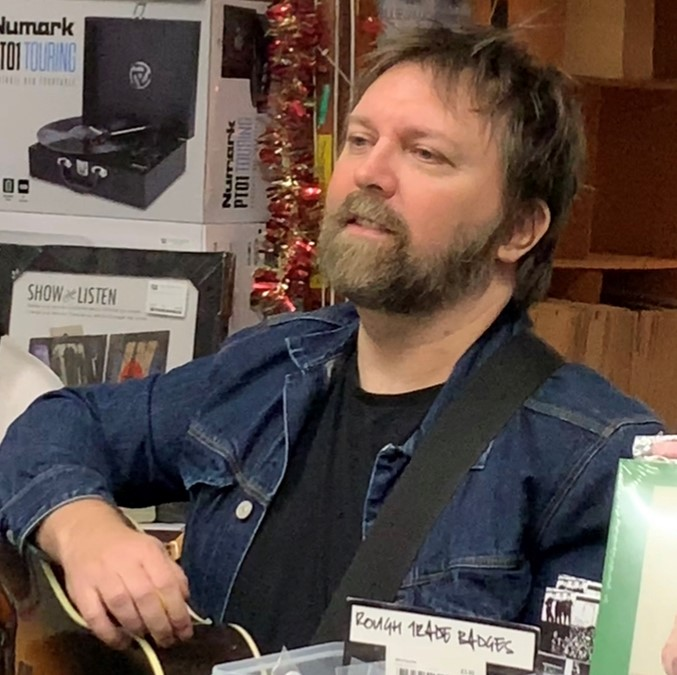
- Draper in 2019

Background information
- Born: Paul Edward Draper; 26 September 1970 (age 56); Liverpool, England
- Genres: Alternative rock, indie rock, Britpop, progressive rock
- Occupations: Musician, singer-songwriter, record producer
- Instruments: Vocals, guitar, keyboards, piano, synthesizers
- Years active: 1995–present
- Labels: Kscope, Too Pure
- Website: pauldraperofficial.com

Paul Edward Draper (born 26 September 1970 in Liverpool) is an English singer-songwriter, musician and record producer, formerly the frontman of the rock band Mansun.

== Biography ==
=== Early days ===
Paul Draper grew up on Garmoyle Road in Wavertree, Liverpool before moving with his family to Connah's Quay, Deeside. Draper described the area as being "the absolute nothing of Great Britain", adding "Deeside is just the bit where the Welsh people really aren't Welsh because they were infiltrated by the English in the Fifties and Sixties. It's where everyone from Liverpool ended up. Basically, just after the war, Liverpool had 800,000 people; now it's got 390,000 people, and the missing 400,000 all live in Deeside. It's a horrible, horrible place. In Liverpool, if you're 15 and you pick up an acoustic guitar in school and play a song, then people would listen. But in my school when I tried to take in a guitar, I was just a poof and a queer, and that was that".

Draper attended St Richard Gwyn Catholic High School, Flint and Thames Polytechnic (now University of Greenwich) where he formed Grind with Steve Heaton and drummer Carlton Hibbert who regularly played around London and released one 12" single before splitting.

=== Mansun ===
Draper returned home to study at Wrexham Art College before forming Mansun with bassist Stove King, and guitarist Dominic Chad. The band signed to Parlophone and released three studio albums before splitting in 2003 whilst recording their fourth.

The band's debut album, Attack of the Grey Lantern, was released in the UK on 15 February 1997 and was released in Japan 9 days prior to the UK release with bonus tracks. The album spent a total of 19 weeks on the UK Albums Chart, peaking at number one.

Mansun's second album, Six, was released in the UK in September 1998 and peaked at number 6.

Little Kix, Mansun's third album, was released in the UK in August 2000 and peaked at number 12.

In 2004, Draper compiled Mansun's aborted fourth album recordings for release in the Kleptomania box set.

In 2006, Draper was diagnosed with cancer (during album sessions at Rockfield Studios), but responded well to chemotherapy, though he was unable to play for several months after the tumour was cut out and his finger swelled up following treatment.

=== Post-Mansun career ===
==== Production work ====
In October 2005, "Alone in My Room", a single by Skin (Skunk Anansie), co-written and co-produced by Draper, was released; his first involvement in any musical project since Kleptomania.

He worked on a version of the 2006 Ibiza anthem "Exceeder" by the Dutch DJ Mason, which was uploaded to his MySpace page, and in 2009 produced and appeared on a track by The Joy Formidable, which was made available as a free download from the band's official website.

Draper performed a version of Mansun's "Wide Open Space" at London Astoria's last ever gig before it closed on 14 January 2009 with My Vitriol. The two acts had toured together previously in 2000, along with King Adora.

In October 2013, Draper stated that he was considering releasing material from his abandoned solo album Spooky Action at a Distance, which only existed in demo form, if there was enough interest. After a petition was set up on Facebook, he responded that he was going to give the idea of releasing solo material some "very serious consideration".

On 5 May 2014, the debut single "What Goes Around" by The Anchoress was released. A collaboration between Draper and singer-songwriter Catherine AD (Catherine Anne Davies), the duo have recorded an album's worth of material with Draper having co-written several of the songs and co-produced the whole album. A follow-up to the single is due for release on 20 October in the form of EP "One For Sorrow". In 2017, Davies reciprocally co-wrote 5 tracks on Draper's solo album Spooky Action.

=== Solo work ===
==== Spooky Action (2014–2018) ====
Draper's first solo song "Feeling My Heart Run Slow" was premiered at a Mansun convention held at The Live Rooms in Chester on 23 August 2014. Recorded especially to play at the convention, Draper with the help of musicians from The Anchoress sessions, recorded five songs from his unrecorded solo album with a view to completing a whole album's worth.

Draper announced his first solo single would be released via monthly subscription service 'The Too Pure Singles Club' in April 2016. It was announced that the official release of his EP One would be released via Kscope on 10 June 2016.

On 25 November 2016, Draper released EP Two featuring lead track "Friends Make The Worst Enemies". His full length album, Spooky Action, was released on 11 August 2017. The album was nominated for Album of the Year at the annual Progressive Music Awards.

Spooky Action was released on 11 August 2017 and reached 19 in the UK album chart. The album stayed in the charts for one week.

EP Three was released as a digital download only on 16 March 2018 featuring a reworked single version of "Jealousy Is a Powerful Emotion" backed with acoustic versions of "Jealousy Is a Powerful Emotion" and "Things People Want". Also featured on the EP was a Public Service Broadcasting remix of "Friends Make the Worst Enemies".

Draper undertook his first UK solo tour in September 2017. His performance at London's Scala was released as the Live at Scala album and subsequently released on 16 February 2018. The gigs were Draper's first live shows since Mansun stopped touring in 2002 featuring tracks from his debut solo album Spooky Action, his solo EPs along with Mansun's Attack of the Grey Lantern and Little Kix.

A second solo tour in February/March 2018 saw Draper performed 2 sets, first featuring his solo material, and a second set performing Mansun's debut album Attack of the Grey Lantern in its entirety.

In April 2018, Draper toured the US as support to Steven Wilson, his first dates in the US since Mansun toured there in 1997.

Following the solo US tour supporting Steven Wilson; Draper toured the UK in November 2018, playing an acoustic set with guitarist Ben Sink. Kscope also announced a new vinyl release, Paul Draper – Attack of the Grey Lantern – Live at the Ritz, recorded in Manchester on 1 March 2018. The show was recorded by Ronnie Stone who produced the original Mansun debut album.

In January 2019, Draper with guitarist Ben Sink supported Steven Wilson on Wilson's headline French tour. They also visited Japan and China for dates in Tokyo, Osaka, Guangdong, Beijing and Shanghai in March 2019.

==== Cult Leader Tactics (2018–present) ====
In 2018, Draper began working on his second solo album. On 29 October 2021, Draper released the "Cult Leader Tactics" title track.

On 28 January 2022, Draper released his second solo album Cult Leader Tactics. It reached 22 in the UK album chart, and it stayed in the charts for one week. The album features guest appearances from musician and producer Steven Wilson on "Omega Man" – a collaboration about Wilson and Draper's feelings of isolation during lockdown, Gamaliel "Gam" Rendle Traynor from the band Sweat, who played, arranged and engineered all strings, as well as a 288-person choir (assembled from clips provided by fans online) who provide backing vocals on "Lyin' Bout Who U Sleep With". In March 2023, Draper toured playing his solo material and Mansun's second album Six.

On 20 February 2026, Draper released Mansun Retold revisiting some of the most powerful songs from Mansun’s catalogue and rebuilding them from the ground up.

=== Controversies ===
In 2016, an online interview with Paul Draper was removed from the Backseat Mafia website, after he made numerous unsubstantiated allegations against former bandmate Dominic Chad. The website issued an apology to Chad, stating that "on February 1st we published an article which contained several unsubstantiated assertions about former Mansun guitarist Dominic Chad. We would like to unreservedly apologise for the upset which the article may have caused Mr Chad and his family for the short period it was online".

In March 2018, at the Rescue Rooms in Nottingham, Draper "sacked his keyboard player onstage and berated the audience". The show was described as being "a chaotic, shambolic embarrassment" by the Nottingham Post. The following day, Draper issued a press release apologising for the show and claimed that a "personal issue raised its head just prior to the gig" that had upset him.

In November 2022, Draper was served a "a six-month interim stalking protection order at the request of the police" in relation to his alleged stalking campaign against former partner Catherine Anne Davies AKA The Anchoress and her manager. Draper denies the claim, with the case going to court in May 2023, delayed to allow him to tour in March/April 2023. Draper strongly denied the claims against him and told followers on his social media channels that a police investigation into him had been dropped - something which has now been confirmed by Surrey Police. WalesOnline asked Catherine how she felt about this and the whole situation, but she said she could not comment at this time.

=== Musical influences ===
As a young man, Draper cited The Beatles as his favourite band and referenced Abbey Road as an influence with the song structures of their 1969 album (in particular tracks like 'She's So Heavy') – "It wasn't standard verse chorus, verse chorus and that really interested me". He also listened to his sister's copy of Pink Floyd's The Dark Side of the Moon to which he affectionately described as "odd". Prince is his all time number one artist with Purple Rain being a particular favourite . "There is real elements of progressive rock in that" says Draper. Attack of the Grey Lantern and Six would later come to reflect these influences. In 2018 he said "If you put my Dad's and my sisters' record collections together, well, I reckon that's how you get Mansun". Further influential and favourites bands were revealed by Draper in an early 2019 interview with GuitarGuitar – "Abba, Prince, The Beatles, Bee Gees, Kate Bush, Motown, Bowie, Depeche Mode are up there as my faves but I like all good songwriters and musicians, I’ve got a wide taste. I really love Dolly Parton and a lot of old school country."

== Discography ==
=== Solo ===
Studio albums

- Spooky Action (2017)
- Cult Leader Tactics (2022)
- Mansun Retold (2026)

Live albums

- Live at Scala (2018)
- Live at the Ritz (2018)

EPs

- EP One (2016)
- EP Two (2016)
- EP Three (2017)

Singles

- "Feeling My Heart Run Slow" (2016)
- "Friends Make the Worst Enemies" (2016)
- "Don't Poke the Bear" (2017)
- "Things People Want" (2017)
- "Grey House" (2017)
- "Jealousy Is a Powerful Emotion" (2018)
- "Cult Leader Tactics" (2021)
- "Omega Man" (featuring Steven Wilson) (2021)

=== With Mansun ===
- Attack of the Grey Lantern (1997)
- Six (1998)
- Little Kix (2000)
- Kleptomania (2004)
