= Wales in the world wars =

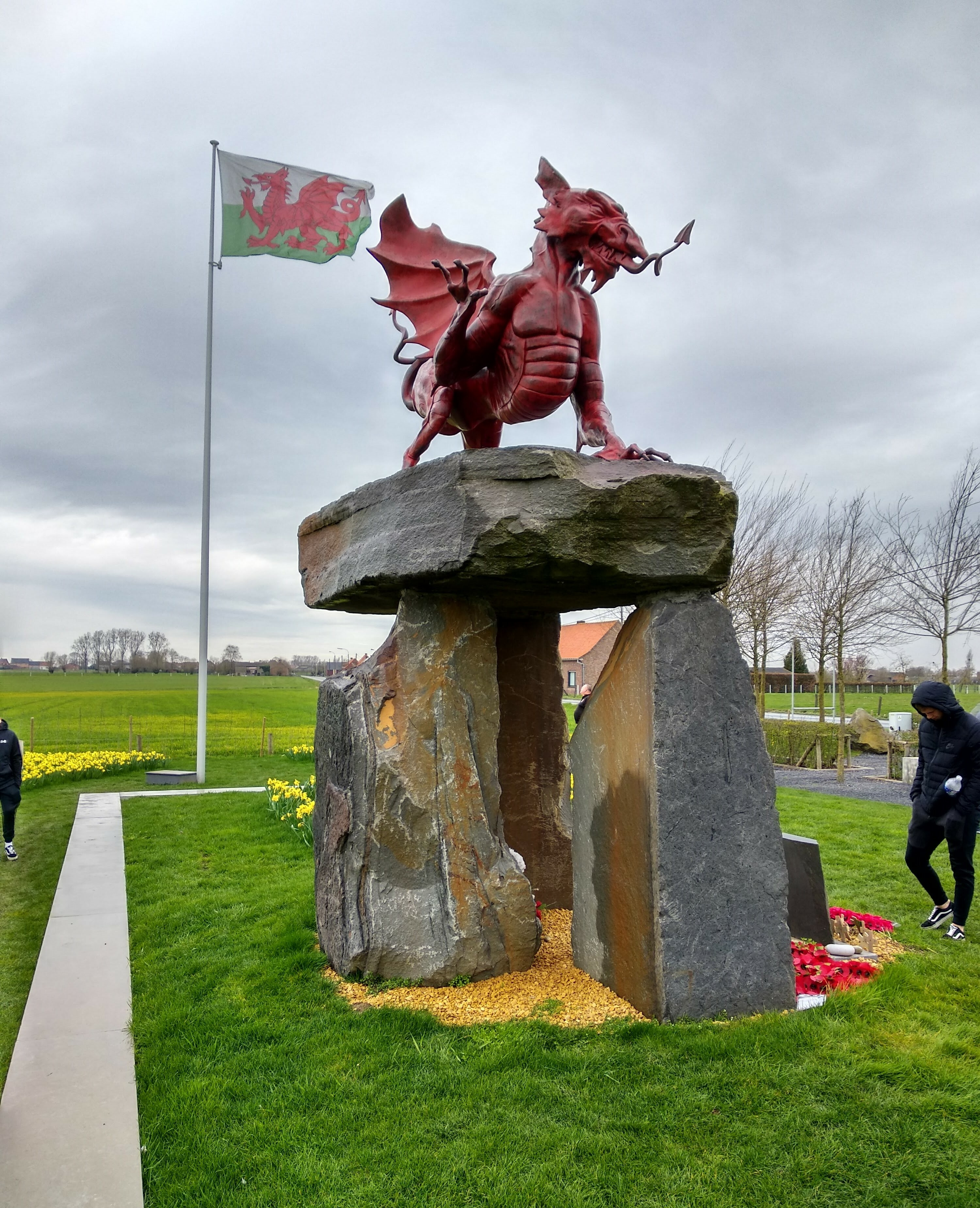
Welsh Memorial Park, Ypres

Wales, as part of the United Kingdom (Note: United Kingdom of Great Britain and Ireland before 1922, including all of Ireland.), participated as part of the allies in World War I (1914–1918) and the allies in World War II (1939–1945).

Just under 275,000 soldiers from Wales fought in World War I, with 35,000 combat deaths, in particular at Mametz Wood and Passchendaele. Welsh battalions also had other encounters on the Western, Tsingtao and Gallipoli fronts during the war. Frongoch, in Merionethshire, was the site of a World War I internment camp, initially housing German prisoners of war, but later Irish republicans after the Easter Rising.

In World War II, 15,000 soldiers from Wales were killed, with notable regiments such as the Royal Welch Fusiliers, had battled in the Western and south-east Asian theatres, whilst the South Wales Borderers had battled in the Mediterranean and Middle East, Norwegian and Normandy campaigns. Cardiff, Swansea and Pembroke experienced bombing raids from the German Luftwaffe during World War II, with the Cardiff Docks being a strategic bombing target for the German air force as it was a major coal port.

Just prior to World War II, a "bombing school" of RAF Penrhos was set up in Penyberth, Caernarfonshire, which received opposition from Welsh nationalists. The bombing facility was used throughout World War II. Island Farm near Bridgend, Glamorgan, housed German and other Axis prisoners of war, of whom had later attempted the largest escape by German POWs in Britain during World War II. Island Farm later housed senior SS military leaders awaiting extradition for the post-war Nuremberg trials.

== World War I ==
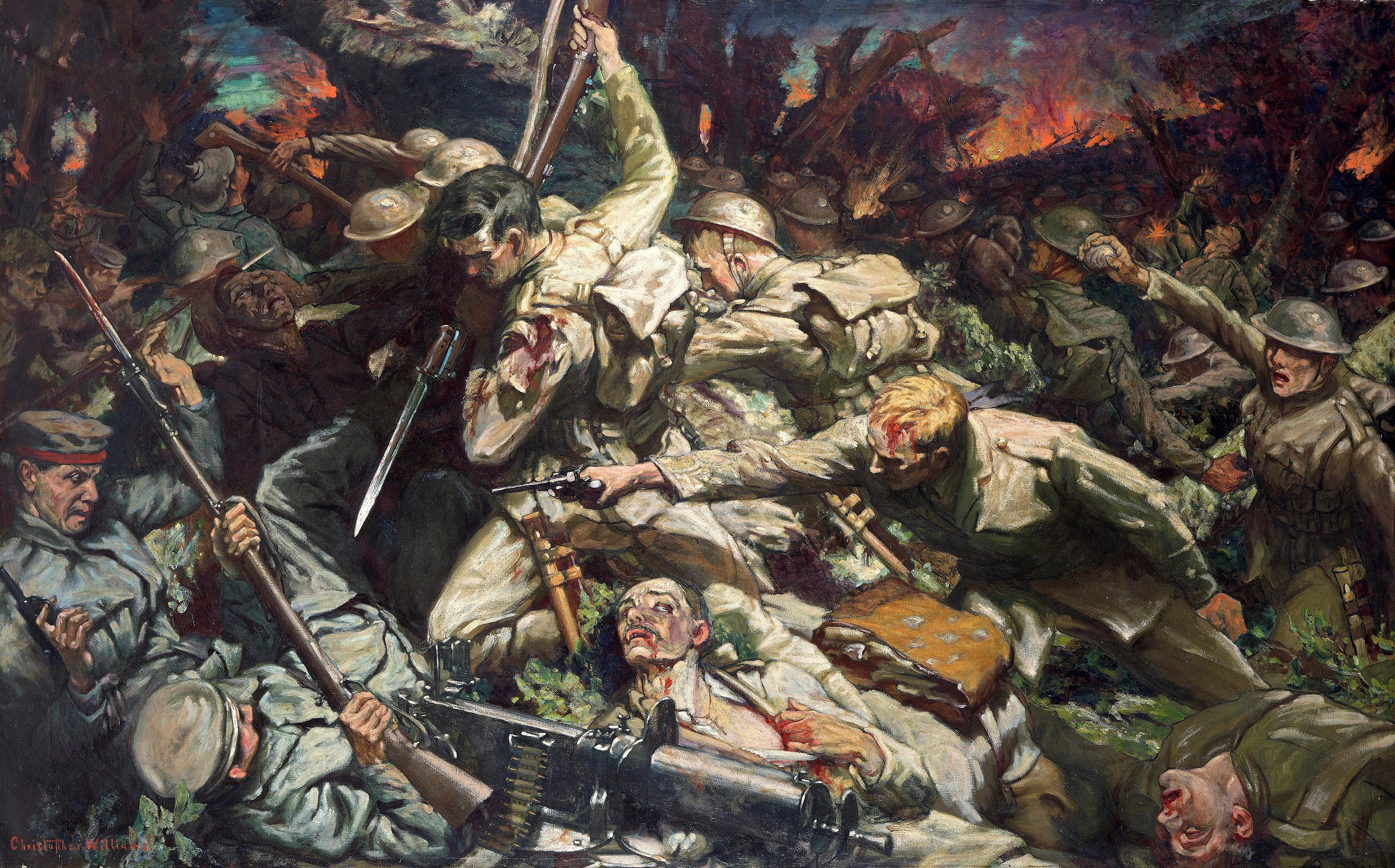
'The Welsh at Mametz Wood' painted by Christopher Williams, commissioned by Secretary of State for War David Lloyd George. William's work depicts the brutal fighting undertaken by the 38th (Welsh) Division at Mametz Wood on 11 July 1916.

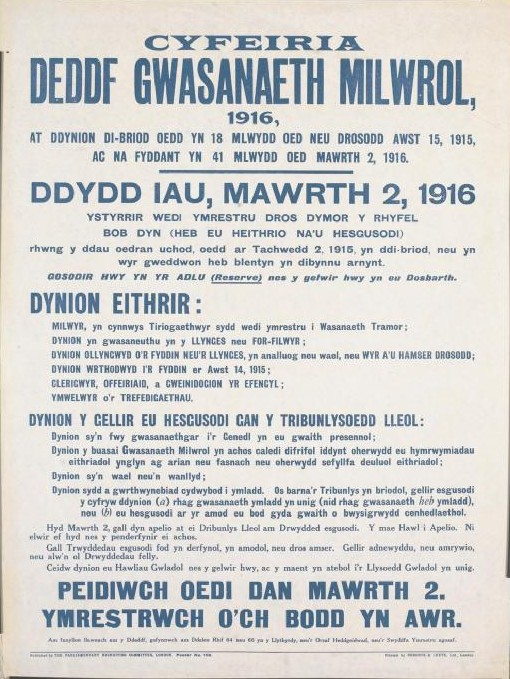
Welsh-language poster explaining the Military Service Act 1916

Historian Kenneth Morgan described Wales on the eve of the First World War as a "relatively placid, self-confident and successful nation". The output from the coalfields continued to increase, with the Rhondda Valley recording a peak of 9.6 million tons of coal extracted in 1913.

The first quarter of the 20th century also saw a shift in the political landscape of Wales. Since 1865, the Liberal Party had held a parliamentary majority in Wales and, following the general election of 1906, only one non-Liberal Member of Parliament, Keir Hardie of Merthyr Tydfil, represented a Welsh constituency at Westminster. Yet by 1906, industrial dissension and political militancy had begun to undermine Liberal consensus in the southern coalfields. In 1916, David Lloyd George became the first Welshman to become Prime Minister of Britain.

=== Fighting Welsh ===
The First World War (1914–1918) saw a total of 272,924 Welshmen under arms, representing 21.5 per cent of the male population. Of these, roughly 35,000 were killed, with particularly heavy losses of Welsh forces at Mametz Wood on the Somme and the Battle of Passchendaele.

The 1st and 2nd battalions of the Royal Welch Fusiliers served on the Western Front from 1914 to 1918 and took part in some of the hardest fighting of the war, including Mametz Wood in 1916 and Passchendaele or Third Ypres in 1917. The Welsh-language poet, Hedd Wyn was part of the Royal Welsh Fusiliers and was killed during the first day of the Battle of Passchendaele during World War I. He was posthumously awarded the bard's chair at the 1917 National Eisteddfod for a poem he wrote on his way to the frontline. Evans, who had been awarded several chairs for his poetry, was inspired to take the bardic name Hedd Wyn ("White Peace" or "Blessed Peace") from the way sunlight penetrated the mist in the Meirionnydd valleys.

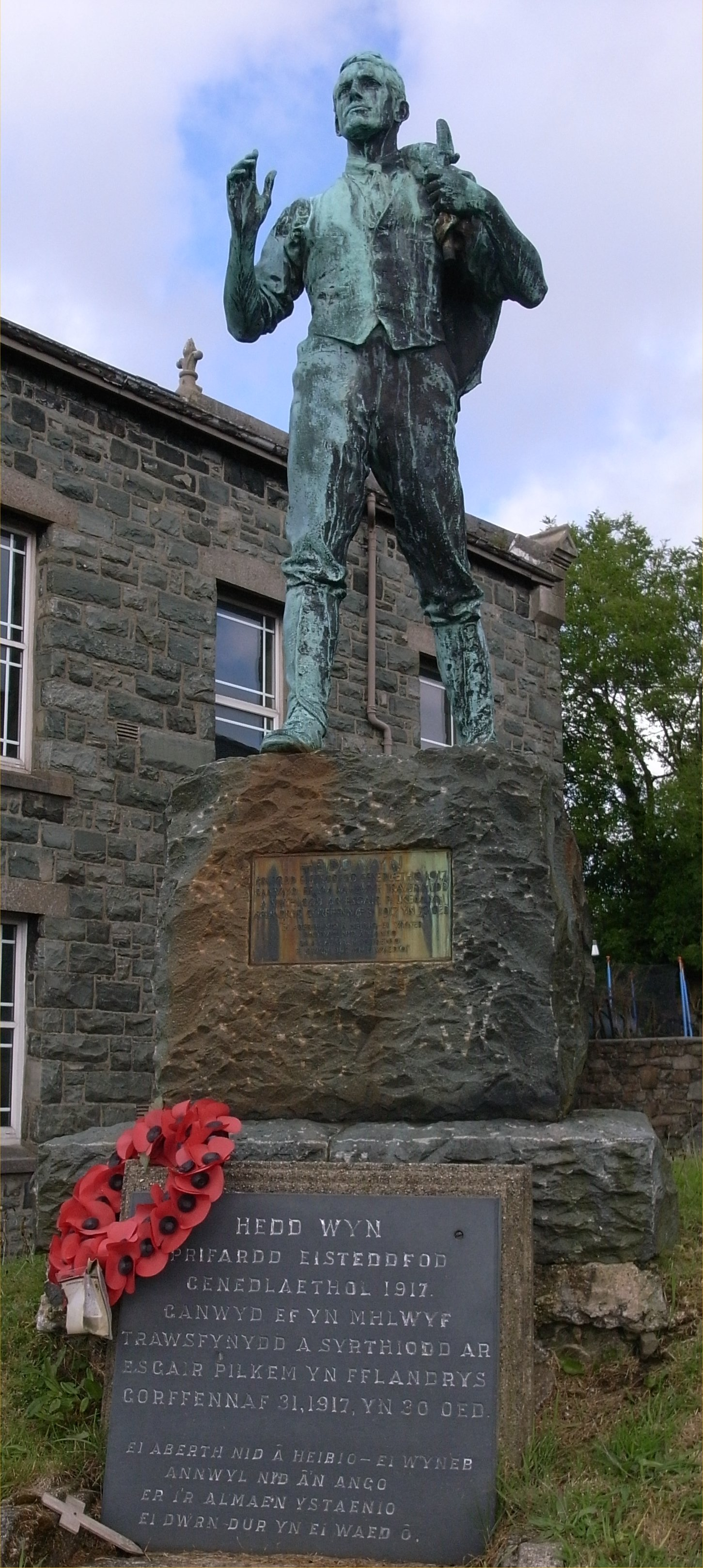
Statue of Hedd Wyn in Trawsfynydd, Gwynedd, Wales

One of his other poems, Rhyfel ("War") is quoted in popular media;

Gwae fi fy myw mewn oes mor ddreng,
A Duw ar drai ar orwel pell;
O'i ôl mae dyn, yn deyrn a gwreng,
Yn codi ei awdurdod hell.

Pan deimlodd fyned ymaith Dduw
Cyfododd gledd i ladd ei frawd;
Mae sŵn yr ymladd ar ein clyw,
A'i gysgod ar fythynnod tlawd.

Mae'r hen delynau genid gynt,
Ynghrog ar gangau'r helyg draw,
A gwaedd y bechgyn lond y gwynt,
A'u gwaed yn gymysg efo'r glaw

Translation:

Why must I live in this grim age,
When, to a far horizon, God
Has ebbed away, and man, with rage,
Now wields the sceptre and the rod?

Man raised his sword, once God had gone,
To slay his brother, and the roar
Of battlefields now casts upon
Our homes the shadow of the war.

The harps to which we sang are hung,
On willow boughs, and their refrain
Drowned by the anguish of the young
Whose blood is mingled with the rain.

Of the South Wales borderers, the 1st Battalion landed at Le Havre as part of the 3rd Brigade in the 1st Division with the British Expeditionary Force in August 1914 for service on the Western Front. The 2nd Battalion landed at Laoshan Bay for operations against the German territory of Tsingtao in September 1914 and saw action at the Siege of Tsingtao in October 1914. After returning home in January 1915, the 2nd Battalion landed at Cape Helles as part of the 87th Brigade in the 29th Division in April 1915; it was evacuated from Gallipoli in January 1916 and then landed at Marseille in March 1916 for service on the Western Front.

==== Mametz Wood ====
Mametz Wood was the objective of the 38th (Welsh) Division during the First Battle of the Somme. The attack was made in a northerly direction over a ridge, focusing on the German positions in the wood, between 7 July and 12 July 1916. On 7 July the men formed the first wave intending to take the wood in a matter of hours. However, strong fortification, machine-guns and shelling killed and injured over 400 soldiers before they reached the wood. Further attacks by the 17th Division on 8 July failed to improve the position.

The Welsh soldiers did not lack in courage, but had been given an impossible task. Eventually Welsh troops fought their way into the woods but were outnumbered by German defenders three-to-one. The Welsh had been trained for this type of warfare. In addition, the wood had poor visibility and was difficult to maintain one's bearings. By dawn of 12 July, the Welsh had taken Mametz Wood. The 38th (Welsh) Division was relieved and taken out of the front line.

The commander over British forces at the Somme, Douglas Haig was later described as "The Butcher of the Somme" and 'Butcher' Haig.

=== Frongoch prisoners of the Irish Easter Rising ===
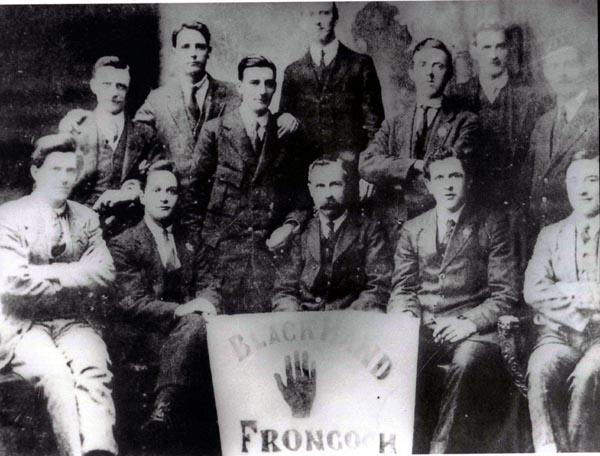
Irish republican prisoners interned at Frongoch following the Easter Rising

Until 1916 the camp housed German prisoners of war in a yellow distillery and crude huts, but in the wake of the 1916 Easter Rising in Dublin, Ireland, the German prisoners were moved and it was used as an internment camp for approximately 1,800 Irish republicans, held without trial. Among them such notables as Michael Collins, who were accorded the status of prisoners of war. Among the prisoners were the future Hollywood actor Arthur Shields and sportsman and referee Tom Burke. Later the camps such as Frongoch became known as ollscoil na réabhlóide ("Universities of Revolution") where future leaders including Michael Collins, Terence McSwiney and J. J. O'Connell began to plan the coming struggle for independence. Elwyn Edwards, a local councillor, historian and poet suggests that the Irish War of Independence was won in Fongoch in Wales.

== World War II ==
For the first time in centuries, the population of Wales went into decline; unemployment reduced only with the production demands of the Second World War.

German plans for Operation Sea Lion, the proposed invasion of the British mainland, which were translated into English by the University of Oxford following the war, contained detailed plans for the occupation of Wales. The plans reportedly included the Balkanisation of the United Kingdom, including the creation of a semi-autonomous Welsh state in which the Welsh language would have been banned and a significant proportion of the male population conscripted into military service. An extract from the documents stated:

Unlike the bright English they are dark and small in stature. Even though they have largely abandoned their language, they have still retained a reasonably strong awareness of their distinctive heritage and culture.

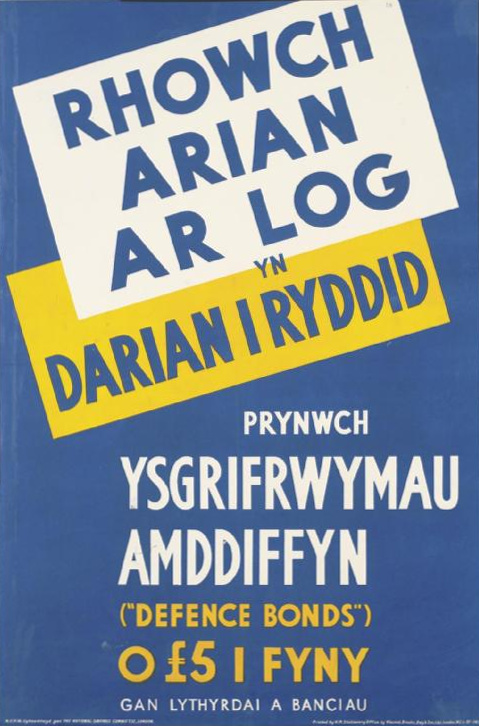
Welsh-language advertisement for war bonds, Second World War

=== Penyberth ===
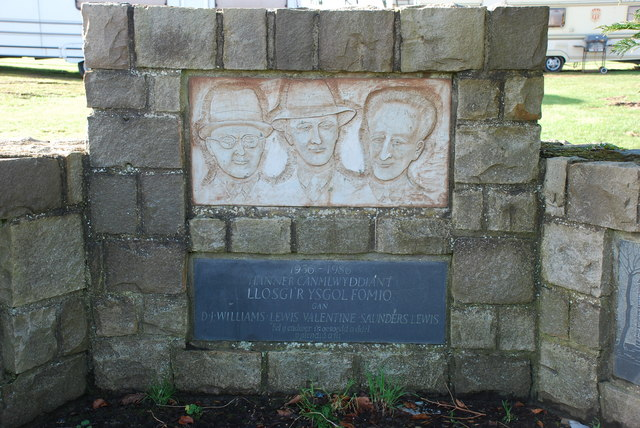
Memorial to the trio that burned the bombing school at Penyberth

Welsh nationalism was ignited in the lead up to the second world war, when in 1936 the UK government settled on establishing the RAF Penrhos bombing school at Penyberth on the Llŷn Peninsula in Gwynedd. The events surrounding the protest, known as Tân yn Llŷn (Fire in Llŷn), helped define Plaid Genedlaethol Cymru (National Party of Wales). The UK government settled on Llŷn as the site for its new bombing school after similar locations in Northumberland and Dorset were met with protests.

However, UK Prime Minister Stanley Baldwin refused to hear the case against the bombing school in Wales, despite a deputation representing half a million Welsh protesters. Protest against the bombing school was summed up by Saunders Lewis when he wrote that the UK government was intent upon turning one of the 'essential homes of Welsh culture, idiom, and literature' into a place for promoting a barbaric method of warfare. Construction of the bombing school building began exactly 400 years after the first part of the Laws in Wales Acts 1535 and 1542 which brought Wales into the same legal jurisdiction and administrative state as the rest of the Kingdom of England. The RAF Penrhos "bombing school" was in use throughout the second world war, from February 1937 until October 1946.

=== Fighting Welsh ===
The war saw Welsh servicemen and women fight in all major theatres, with some 15,000 of them killed. After 1943, 10 percent of Welsh conscripts aged 18 were sent to work in the coal mines, where there were labour shortages; they became known as Bevin Boys. Pacifist numbers during both world wars were fairly low, especially in the Second World War, which was seen as a fight against fascism.

The Royal Welch Fusilers regiment was awarded 27 battle honours for World War II, with more than 1,200 fusiliers killed in action or died of wounds. The 1st battalion fought in the short but fierce battles of France and Belgium and was forced to retreat and be evacuated during the Dunkirk evacuation. After two years spent in the United Kingdom, waiting and preparing for the invasion that never came (Operation Sea Lion), the 1st RWF and the rest of 2nd Division were sent to British India to fight the Imperial Japanese Army after a string of defeats inflicted upon the British and Indian troops. The battalion was involved in the Burma Campaign, particularly the Battle of Kohima, nicknamed the "Stalingrad of the East" due to the ferocity of fighting on both sides, that helped to turn the tide of the campaign in the South East Asian theatre.

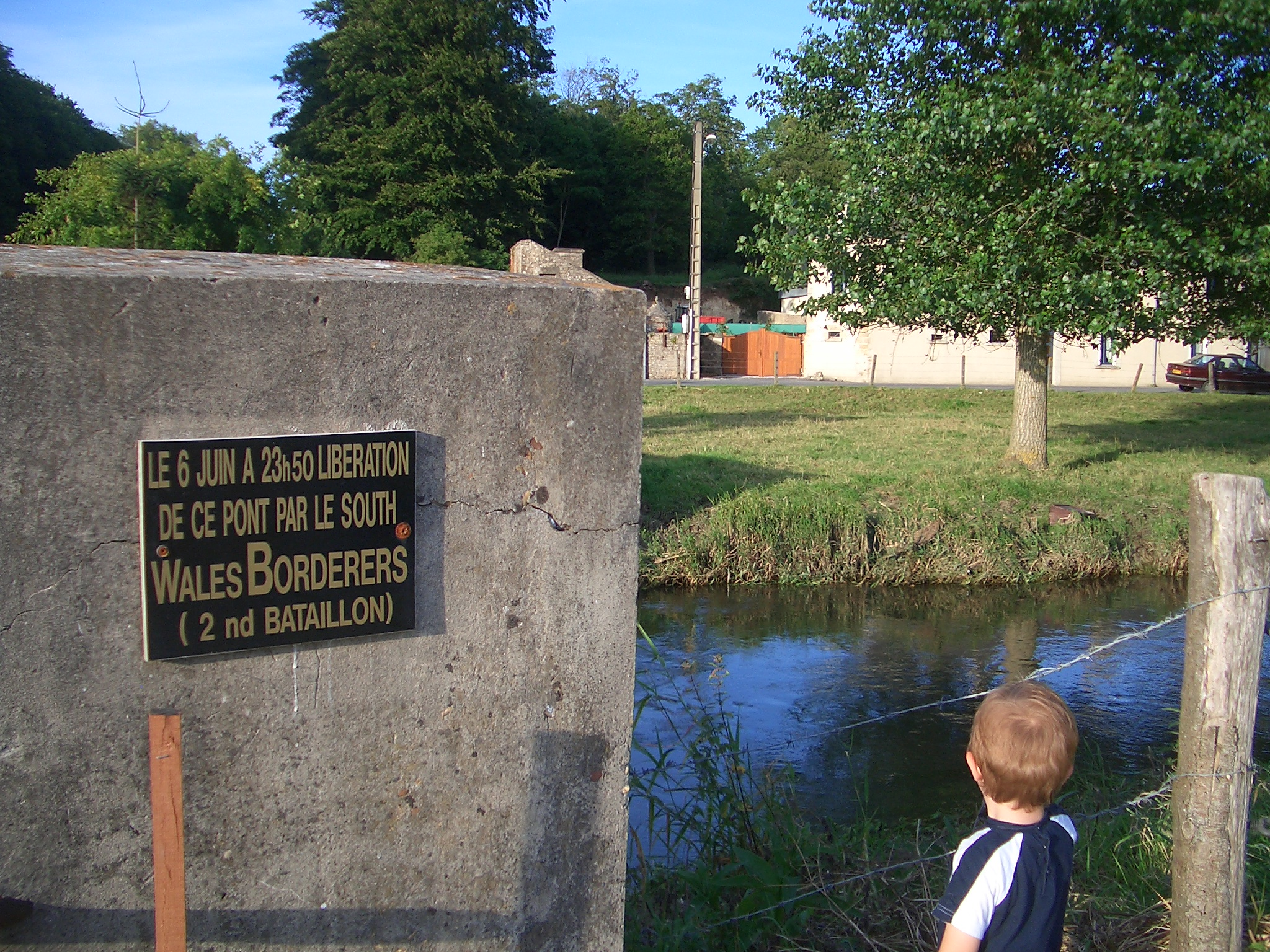
Plaque commemorating the liberation of a bridge in Normandy by the 2nd Battalion, South Wales Borderers on D-Day in June 1944

Of the South Wales Borderers, the 1st Battalion, as part of the 10th Indian Infantry Division, was sent to Iraq to quell a German-inspired uprising in Iraq in November 1941. The battalion saw subsequent service in Iran. The battalion sustained enormous casualties in Libya near Tobruk when they lost around 500 officers and men captured or killed during a general retreat. The battalion found itself cut off when the German forces outflanked them, the Commanding Officer, Lieutenant Colonel Francis Matthews, decided to attempt to escape around the enemy and break through to British lines. It turned into a disaster with only four officers and around one hundred men reaching Sollum.

Upon the outbreak of the Second World War in September 1939, the 2nd Battalion of the South Wales Bordrers was serving in Derry, Northern Ireland, under command of Northern Ireland District, having been there since December 1936. In December 1939 the battalion left Northern Ireland and was sent to join the 148th Infantry Brigade of the 49th (West Riding) Infantry Division, a Territorial formation. In April 1940 the battalion was again transferred to the newly created 24th Guards Brigade (Rupertforce), and took part in the Norwegian Campaign, and were among the first British troops to see action against the German Army in the Second World War. The campaign failed and the brigade had to be evacuated. Casualties in the battalion, however, had been remarkably light, with only 13 wounded and 6 killed and two DCMs had been awarded. The battalion had the distinction of being the only Welsh battalion to take part in the Normandy landings on 6 June 1944, landing at Gold Beach under command of 50th (Northumbrian) Infantry Division and fought in the Battle of Normandy, under command of 7th Armoured Division for a few days in June 1944, before reverting to the 50th Division.

=== Blitz ===
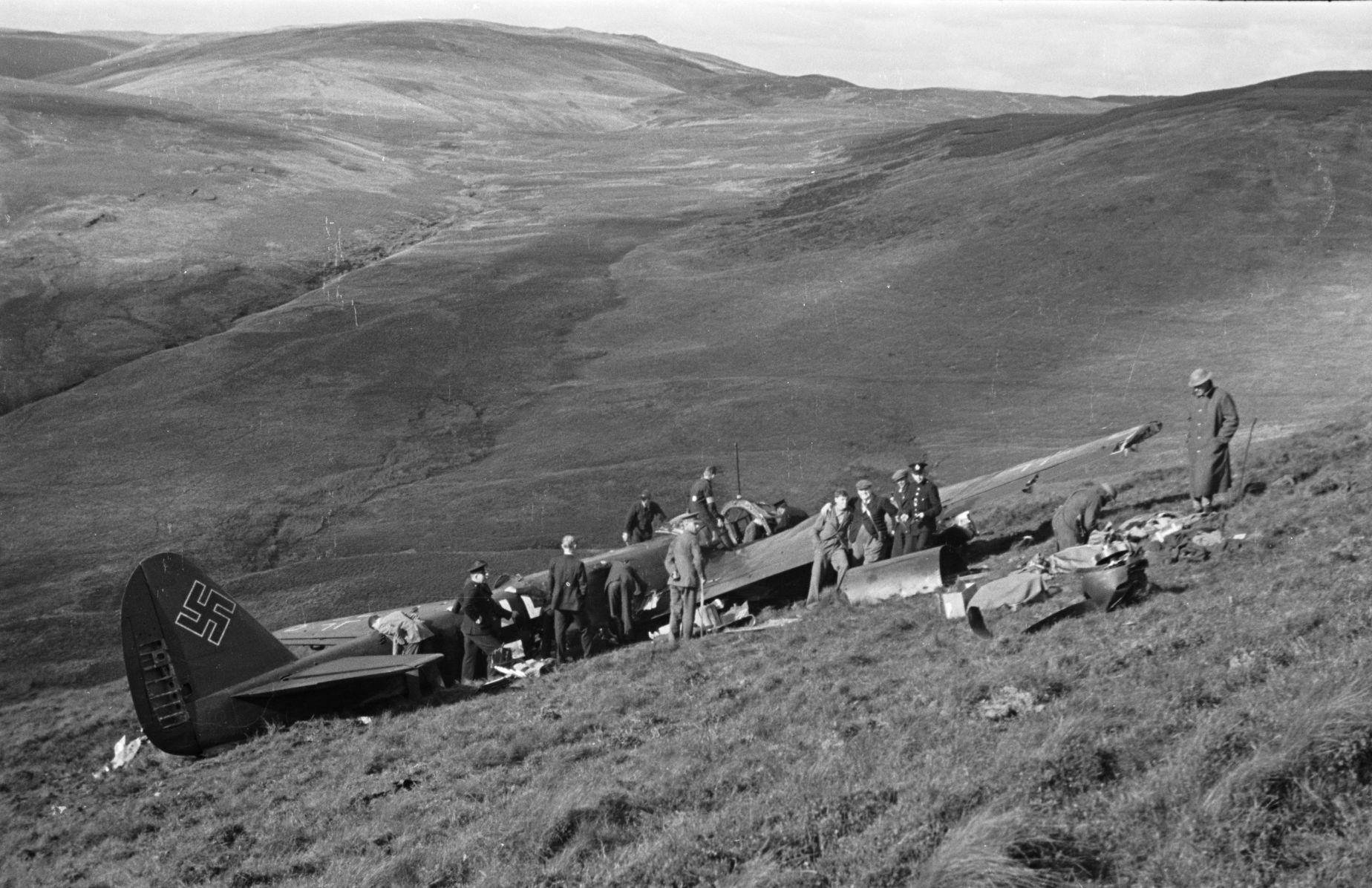
Crashed Luftwaffe bomber in Wales, 31 August 1940

Bombing raids brought high loss of life as the Luftwaffe targeted the docks at Swansea, Cardiff and Pembroke.

The Cardiff Blitz between 1940 and the final raid on the city in March 1944 approximately 2,100 bombs fell, killing 355 people.

Cardiff Docks became a strategic bombing target for the Luftwaffe as it was one of the biggest coal ports in the world. Consequently, it and the surrounding area were heavily bombed. Llandaff Cathedral, amongst many other civilian buildings caught in the raids, was damaged by the bombing in 1941.

=== Prisoner of war camp ===
Island Farm, also called Camp 198, was a prisoner of war camp on the outskirts of the town of Bridgend, South Wales. It hosted a number of Axis prisoners, mainly German, and was the scene of the largest escape attempt by German POWs in Britain during World War II. Near the end of the war it was renamed Special Camp XI and used to detain many senior SS military leaders who were awaiting extradition to the Nuremberg trials.

== See also ==
- Conscientious objectors in Wales

== Bibliography ==
Davies, John; Jenkins, Nigel; Baines, Menna; Lynch, Peredur I., eds. (2008). The Welsh Academy Encyclopaedia of Wales. Cardiff: University of Wales Press. ISBN 978-0-7083-1953-6.
