= History of Plaid Cymru =

Aspect of Welsh political history

Plaid Cymru – The Party of Wales
- Leader: Rhun ap Iorwerth
- Chairman: Alun Ffred Jones
- Chief Executive: Rhuanedd Richards
- Honorary President: Dafydd Wigley
- Founder: Saunders Lewis
- Founded: 5 August 1925
- Headquarters: 18 Park Grove, Cardiff, CF10 3BN; Wales
- Ideology: Welsh nationalism Welsh independence Social democracy
- Political position: Centre-left
- European affiliation: European Free Alliance
- European Parliament group: Greens-EFA
- International affiliation: none
- Colours: Green and yellow

Website
- www.plaid.cymru

Plaid Cymru (Welsh for 'The Party of Wales', pronounced [plaid ˈkəmrɨ]), often shortened to Plaid, originated in 1925 after a meeting held at that year's National Eisteddfod in Pwllheli, Caernarfonshire (now Gwynedd). Representatives from two Welsh nationalist groups founded the previous year, Byddin Ymreolwyr Cymru ("Army of Welsh Home Rulers") and Y Mudiad Cymreig ("The Welsh Movement"), agreed to meet and discuss the need for a "Welsh party". The party was founded as Plaid Genedlaethol Cymru, the National Party of Wales, and attracted members from the left, right and centre of the political spectrum, including both monarchists and republicans. Its principal aims include the promotion of the Welsh language and the political independence of the Welsh nation.

Although Saunders Lewis is regarded as the founder of Plaid Cymru, the historian John Davies argues that the ideas of the left-wing activist D. J. Davies, which were adopted by the party's president Gwynfor Evans after the Second World War, were more influential in shaping its ideology in the long term. According to the historian John Davies, D. J. Davies was an "equally significant figure" as was Lewis in the history of Welsh nationalism, but it was Lewis's "brilliance and charismatic appeal" which was firmly associated with Plaid in the 1930s.

After initial success as an educational pressure group, the events surrounding Tân yn Llŷn (Fire in Llŷn) in the 1930s led to the party adopting a pacifist political doctrine. Protests against the flooding of Capel Celyn in the 1950s further helped define its politics. These early events were followed by Evans's election to Parliament as the party's first Member of Parliament (MP) in 1966, the successful campaigning for the Welsh Language Act of 1967 and Evans going on hunger strike for a dedicated Welsh-language television channel in 1981.

Plaid Cymru is currently the largest political party in Wales, with 43 out of 96 seats in the Senedd. From 2007 to 2011, it was the junior partner in the One Wales coalition government, with Welsh Labour. Plaid held one of the four Welsh seats in the European Parliament, holds four of the 40 Welsh seats in the UK Parliament, and it has 203 of 1,253 principal local authority councillors. According to accounts filed with the Electoral Commission for the year 2018, the party had an income of around £690,000 and an expenditure of about £730,000.

== Background ==
There had been discussions about the need for a "Welsh party" since the 19th century. With the generation or so before 1922 there "had been a marked growth in the constitutional recognition of the Welsh nation", wrote historian Dr John Davies. A Welsh national consciousness re-emerged during the 19th century; leading to the establishment of the National Eisteddfod in 1861, the University of Wales (Prifysgol Cymru) in 1893, and the National Library of Wales (Llyfrgell Genedlaethol Cymru) in 1911, and by 1915 the Welsh Guards (Gwarchodlu Cymreig) was formed to include Wales in the UK national components of the Foot Guards. By 1924 there were people in Wales "eager to make their nationality the focus of Welsh politics".

Following the 18th century Methodist Revival and continued growth in a distinctive Welsh political consciousness, the Liberal government under Prime Minister William Gladstone (after winning all but 4 Welsh Parliamentary seats in the 1880 election) passed the Sunday Closing (Wales) Act 1881 closing all public houses in Wales on Sundays. It was the first Act since the annexation of Wales by the Laws in Wales Act 1535 and 1542 which applied uniquely to Wales.

In 1886 the Cymru Fydd movement was founded by influential Welsh figures and politicians, and leter led by David Lloyd George (later the only Welsh Prime Minister of the UK). The movement advocated support for Welsh cultural nationalism as well as Welsh self-government. The movement collapsed in 1896. Plaid Cymru leader and Deputy First Minister Ieuan Wyn Jones said of Cymru Fydd "the ideology and influence of Cymru Fydd helped crystallise the early philosophy of Plaid Cymru, and created the space for a new party to develop".

Following the 1904-1905 Welsh Revival and influence in George's ministry, the Church in Wales was disestablished from the Church of England in 1914, coming into effect in 1920.

Support for home rule for Wales and Scotland amongst most political parties was strongest in 1918 following the independence of other European countries after the First World War, and the Easter Rising in Ireland, wrote Dr Davies. However after George's premiership in the general elections of 1922, 1923, and 1924 "Wales as a political issue was increasingly eliminated from the [national agenda]". By August 1925 unemployment in Wales had risen to 28.5%, in contrast to the economic boom in the early 1920s. For Wales, the long depression began in 1925.

== Foundation 1925 ==
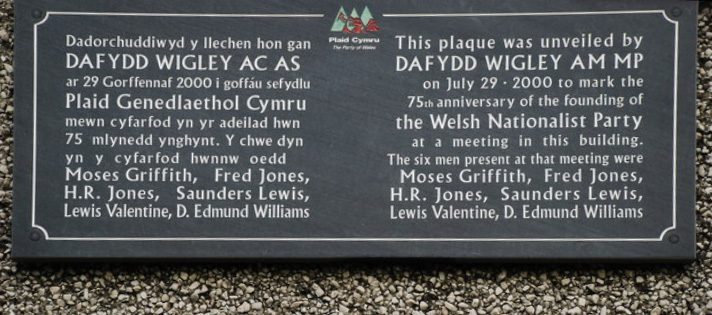
This plaque, inaugurated to commemorate the 75th anniversary of the party, is fixed to the building where the founding meeting took place.

It was in this climate that the Welsh Home Rulers group and the Welsh Movement met. Both organisations sent a delegation of three to the meeting, with H. R. Jones heading the Welsh Home Rulers group and Saunders Lewis heading The Welsh Movement. They were joined by Lewis Valentine, D.J. Williams, and Ambrose Bebb, among others. The principal aim of the party was to foster a Welsh-speaking Wales. To this end it was agreed that party business be conducted in Welsh, and that members sever all links with other British parties. Lewis insisted on these principles before he would agree to the Pwllheli conference.

According to the 1911 census, out of a total population of Wales of just under 2.5 million, 43.5% spoke Welsh as a primary language. This was a decrease from the 1891 census with 54.4% speaking Welsh out of a population of 1.5 million.

In these circumstances Lewis condemned "'Welsh nationalism' as it had hitherto existed, a nationalism characterised by inter-party conferences, an obsession with Westminster and a willingness to accept a subservient position for the Welsh language", wrote Dr Davies. It may be because of these strict positions that the party failed to attract politicians of experience in its early years. However, the party's members believed its founding was an achievement in itself; "merely by existing, the party was a declaration of the distinctiveness of Wales", wrote Dr Davies.

In these early years Plaid Genedlaethol Cymru published a monthly paper called Y Ddraig Goch (the Red Dragon, the national symbol of Wales) and held an annual summer school.

H. R. Jones, the party's full-time secretary, established a few party branches, while Valentine served as party president between 1925 and 1926. In the UK General Election of 1929, Valentine stood for Caernarfon and polled 609 votes. Later they became known as 'the Gallant Six Hundred' when Dafydd Iwan immortalised them in song.

By 1932 the aims of self government and Welsh representation at the League of Nations had been added to that of preserving Welsh language and culture. However, this move, and the party's early attempts to develop an economic critique, did not lead to the broadening of its appeal beyond that of an intellectual and socially conservative Welsh-language pressure group.

== The Lewis Doctrine 1926–1939 ==
During the inter-war years, Plaid Genedlaethol Cymru was most successful as a social and educational pressure group rather than as a political party. For Saunders Lewis, party president 1926–1939, "the chief aim of the party [is] to 'take away from the Welsh their sense of inferiority... to remove from our beloved country the mark and shame of conquest.'" Lewis sought to cast Welshness into a new context, wrote Dr Davies.

Lewis wished to demonstrate how Welsh heritage was linked as one of the "founders of European civilisation". Lewis, a self-described "strong monarchist", wrote, "Civilisation is more than an abstraction. It must have a local habitation and name. Here its name is Wales." Additionally, Lewis strove for the stability and well-being of Welsh-speaking communities, decried both capitalism and socialism and promoted what he called perchentyaeth: a policy of "distributing property among the masses".

=== Broadcasting campaigns and 1931 Census ===
Plaid Cymru's logo before 2006

With the advent of broadcasting in Wales, Plaid Genedlaethol Cymru protested the lack of Welsh-language programmes in Wales and launched a campaign to withhold licence fees. Pressure was successful, and by the mid-1930s more Welsh-language programming was broadcast, with the formal establishment of a Welsh regional broadcasting channel by 1937.

According to the 1931 census, out of a population of just over 2.5 million, the percentage of Welsh speakers in Wales had dropped to 36.8%, with Ynys Môn recording the highest concentration of speakers at 87.4%, followed by Ceredigion (Cardiganshire) at 87.1%, Merionethshire (Sir Meirionnydd) at 86.1%, and Carmarthen at 82.3%. Caernarfonshire listed 79.2%. Radnorshire and Monmouthshire ranked lowest with a concentration of Welsh speakers of less than 6% of the population.

=== Tân yn Llŷn 1936 ===
In 1936, the British government settled on establishing an airfield known as RAF Penrhos at Penyberth on the Llŷn peninsula, now in Gwynedd. The airfield would also be host to a bombing school, which led to widespread nationalist protests in Wales. The events surrounding the protest, known as Tân yn Llŷn ('Fire in Llŷn'), helped define Plaid Genedlaethol Cymru. The government settled on Llŷn as the site for the new airfield and bombing school after proposals for similar locations in Northumberland and Dorset were met with protests.

The Prime Minister, Stanley Baldwin, refused to hear the case against the planned site, despite a deputation representing 500,000 Welsh protesters. Public opinion in Wales was summed by Lewis when he claimed that the government was intent upon turning one of the "essential homes of Welsh culture, idiom, and literature" into a place for promoting what he viewed as a barbaric method of warfare. Construction of the bombing school building began exactly 400 years after the first of the Laws in Wales Acts 1535–1542 were passed.

On 8 September 1936 the bombing school building was set on fire and in the investigations which followed Lewis, Lewis Valentine and D. J. Williams claimed responsibility. The trial at Caernarfon failed to agree on a verdict and the case was sent to the Old Bailey in London. The three men were sentenced to nine months' imprisonment in WorHM Prison Wormwood Scrubs, and on their release they were greeted as heroes by a crowd of 15,000 people at a pavilion in Caernarfon.

Many Welsh people were angered by the judge's scornful treatment of the Welsh language, by the decision to move the trial to London, and by the decision of University College, Swansea, to dismiss Lewis from his post before he had been found guilty. The scholar and historian Dafydd Glyn Jones wrote of the fire that it was "the first time in five centuries that Wales struck back at England with a measure of violence... To the Welsh people, who had long ceased to believe that they had it in them, it was a profound shock".

However, despite the acclaim generated by the events of Tân yn Llŷn, by 1938 Lewis's concept of perchentyaeth was firmly rejected as not a fundamental tenet of the party. In 1939 Lewis resigned as President of Plaid Genedlaethol Cymru, citing that Wales was not ready to accept the leadership of a Roman Catholic. The academic and theologian J. E. Daniel, the party's former vice-president between 1931 and 1935, was elected as president of Plaid Genedlaethol Cymru in 1939, serving until 1943.

=== Criticism ===
Saunders Lewis' perceived "elitist views", and a "condescending attitude towards some aspects of nonconformist, radical and pacifist traditions of Wales" drew criticism from fellow nationalists such as David James (D. J.) Davies, a leftist Plaid Cymru party member and founder. Davies argued in favour of engaging English-speaking Welsh communities, and stressed the territorial integrity of Wales. Davies pointed towards Scandinavian countries as a model to emulate, and was active in the economic implications of Welsh self-government.

Notwithstanding his intellect Lewis may have been ill-equipped to lead the party, or even to convince his immediate colleagues of his theories. Historian Geraint H. Jenkins writes: "... Lewis was a cold fish. His reedy voice, bow tie, cerebral style and aristocratic contempt for the proletariat were hardly endearing qualities in a political leader, and his conversion to Catholicism lost him the sympathy of fervent Nonconformists. Heavily influenced by the discourse of right-wing French theorists, this profoundly authoritarian figure developed a grand strategy, such as it was, based on the deindustrialization of Wales. Such a scheme was both impractical and unpopular. It caused grave embarrassment to his socialist colleague D. J. Davies, a progressive economist who, writing with force and passion, showed a much better grasp of the economic realities of the time and greater sensitivity towards the plight of working people."

Speaking at the North American Association for the Study of Welsh Culture and History in Gallia County, Ohio, in 2001, Professor John Davies said

The other strand of Welsh twentieth-century radicalism, that of Plaid Cymru, also had American associations. While Saunders Lewis looked to France and Rome, that equally significant figure D. J. Davies looked to the Nordic countries and to America, in whose armed forces he served in the First World War, as a protest against the class-bound attitudes of the officers of the British Army. His inspiration came above all from the New Deal, and year in year out the model he offered for the regeneration of depression-ridden Wales was the work of the Tennessee Valley Authority.

It was Davies' ideal of Welsh nationalism which was adopted by Plaid Cymru after the Second World War, wrote Dr Davies. But it was Lewis' "brilliance and charismatic appeal" which was firmly associated with Plaid Genedlaethol Cymru in the 1930s.

The appeal of Plaid Genedlaethol Cymru may have been further complicated by the apparent "fascist-style corporatism shown by [Lewis] and other Roman Catholic leaders of the party", according to historian Lord Morgan. Author G. A. Williams characterised the party of the 1930s as a "right wing force", and "Its journal refused to resist Hitler or Mussolini, ignored or tolerated anti-Semitism and, in effect, came out in support of Franco."

=== Bards under the bed 1939–1945 ===
During the Second World War the UK government felt it prudent to "avoid action which might foster the growth of an extreme Welsh nationalist movement". Clement Attlee, the Secretary of State for Dominion Affairs from 1942 to 1943, voiced concern over Welsh nationalists after a deputation of Welsh Labour MPs met with him about the perceived neglect of Welsh issues during the war.

Attlee characterised Welsh nationalists as "mischievous [who] tend to be against the war effort". To root-out Welsh nationalist sympathies within army units, the UK Ministry of Labour and National Service reported that Welsh-speaking men were posted to predominantly Welsh-speaking units to report on anti-war sympathies. Additional plans were developed to counter growing Plaid Cymru influence and included "rolling out" a member of the royal family to "smooth things over", according to then constitutional expert Edward Iwi. In a report he gave to Home Secretary Herbert Morrison, Iwi proposed to make the then Princess Elizabeth constable of Caernarfon Castle (a post held by David Lloyd George until his death in January 1945), and patroness of Urdd Gobaith Cymru, and for her to tour Wales as Urdd's patroness.

Appointing the princess as constable of Caernarfon Castle was rejected by the Home Secretary, as potentially creating conflict between north and south Wales, and King George VI refused to let the teenage princess tour Wales, to avoid undue pressure on her; the plan to make the princess patroness of Urdd Gobaith Cymru was dropped, it being thought unsuitable to link the princess, enlisted in the Auxiliary Territorial Service, to an organisation two of whose leading members were conscientious objectors.

Bards under the bed was one term coined by UK officials referring to Welsh nationalists and nationalism during the war years. If ignoring the largely pacifist traditions of Welsh nationalism, some articles in the Welsh-language press could be seen to give credence to Attlee's fears that Welsh nationalists would be used to spearhead an insurgency. However, this characterisation misrepresented Welsh nationalist sentiments, as "[Welsh nationalists] did far more to bring victory than hasten defeat".

Ambrose Bebb, a founding member of the party, was one of the most outspoken party members in support of the war. Bebb considered Nazi Germany's total defeat in the war as essential. Additionally, many members of Plaid Genedlaethol Cymru served in Britain's armed forces. Lewis maintained a strict neutrality in his writings through his column Cwrs y Byd in Y Faner. It was his attempt at an unbiased interpretation of the causes and events of the war.

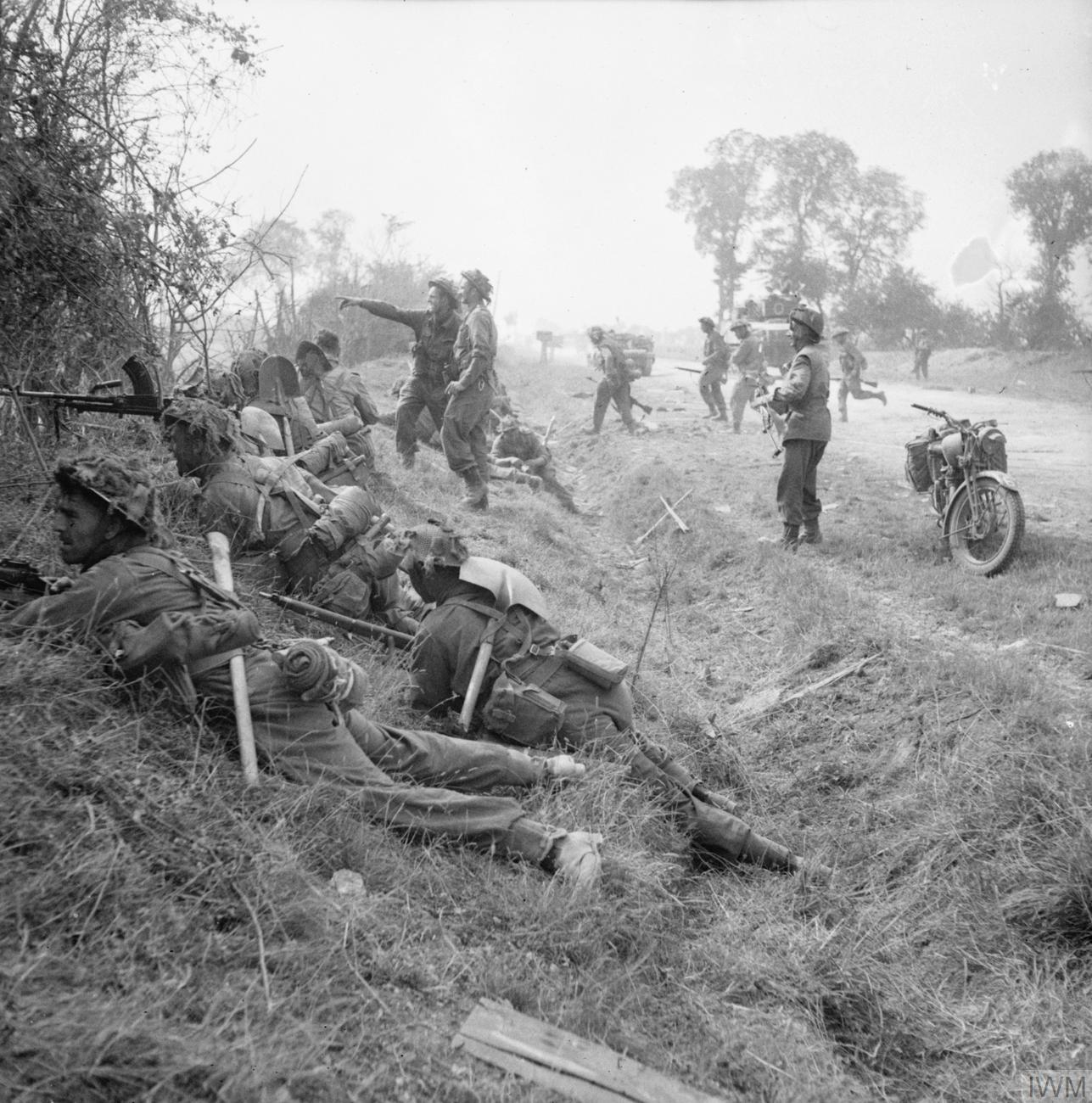
Welsh Guards near Cagny on 19 July 1944. Plaid Cymru members served in the armed forces during the war

Irrespective of the party's initial position on the war, party members were free to choose their own level of support for the war effort. Plaid Genedlaethol Cymru was officially neutral regarding involvement the Second World War, which party leaders considered a continuation of the First World War. Central to the neutrality policy was the idea that Wales, as a nation, had the right to decide independently on its attitude towards war, and the denial of any right of another nation to force Welshmen to serve in its armed forces. With this challenging and revolutionary policy Lewis hoped a significant number of Welshmen would refuse enlistment in the armed forces.

Lewis, who served in the South Wales Borderers during the First World War, was not anti-military. Rather, Lewis and other party members were attempting to strengthen loyalty to the Welsh nation "over the loyalty to the British State". Lewis argued, "The only proof that the Welsh nation exists is that there are some who act as if it did exist". However, most party members who claimed conscientious objector status did so in the context of their moral and religious beliefs, rather than based on political conviction. Of these, almost all were exempted from military service. About 24 party members made politics their sole ground for exemption, of whom twelve received prison sentences (for refusing to attend a medical examination, as an essential preliminary to call-up, after their claim of conscientious had been refused). For Lewis, those who objected proved that the assimilation of Wales was "being withstood, even under the most extreme pressures".

=== University of Wales by-election, 1943 ===
Until 1950, universities elected their own representatives to the UK parliament. In 1943 Lewis contested the University of Wales parliamentary seat at a by-election, his opponent being former Plaid Genedlaethol Cymru deputy vice-president Dr William John Gruffydd. Gruffydd had voiced doubts about Lewis' ideas since 1933, and by 1943 he had joined the Liberal party. The "brilliant but wayward" Gruffydd was a favourite with Welsh-speaking intellectuals and drew 52.3 per cent of the vote, to Lewis' 22 per cent, or 1,330 votes.

The election effectively split the Welsh-speaking intelligentsia, and left Lewis embittered with politics. However, the experience proved invaluable for Plaid Cymru, as they began to refer to themselves, as "for the first time they were taken seriously as a political force". The by-election campaign led directly to "considerable growth" in the party's membership.

== The Evans Legacy 1945–1981 ==
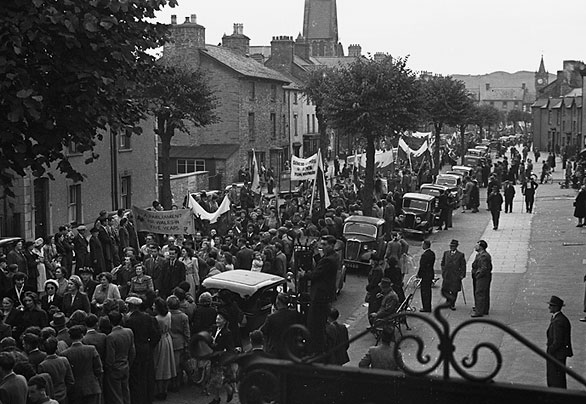
A Plaid Cymru rally in Machynlleth in 1949 where the Parliament for Wales in 5 years campaign was started

With Lewis retreating from direct political involvement, and with the party drawing a modest increase in membership, Dr Gwynfor Evans was elected party president in 1945. Evans, born in Barry in Glamorgan but spending most his life in Llangadog in Carmarthenshire, only learned to speak Welsh as an adult. Evans was educated at the University of Wales, Aberystwyth, and at St John's College, Oxford, where he founded a branch of Plaid Cymru while he was a student. As a devout Christian pacifist, Evans was unconditionally exempted from conscription during the Second World War on grounds of conscientious objection.

Building on a higher profile the party fielded more candidates in elections; and in by-elections in 1945, the party won 25 per cent of the vote in Caernarfon and 16 per cent in Neath. By 1945 Plaid Cymru was in a "better position then it had been in 1939", wrote Dr Davies. Responding to Welsh nationalism, and despite opposition by Labour politicians such as Aneurin Bevan, Morgan Phillips and Attlee, the government felt it prudent to establish the Council of Wales in 1948, an unelected assembly of 27 with the brief of advising the UK government on matters of Welsh interest. The Council of Wales held no authority on its own, to the frustration of many of the councillors.

Following the war Plaid Cymru challenged the government's policy of national service in peacetime, and protested the War Office's use of Welsh lands for training exercises: first in the Preseli Hills in 1946, then in Tregaron in 1947, and then Trawsfynydd in 1951. Throughout the 1950s, Evans reached out to other political parties in Westminster to establish a parliament for Wales. Though failing to establish a Welsh assembly, there was movement on devolution. With Plaid Cymru expanding its influence further into the industrial south-east constituencies, the UK government gave in on small concessions towards devolution. First they established a Minister of Welsh Affairs in 1951, then a Digest of Welsh Statistics began publication in 1954, and in 1955 Cardiff (Caerdydd) was recognised as the Welsh capital city.

At a party conference in 1949, fifty members left Plaid Cymru over Evans' strict observance of a pacifist political doctrine, Plaid Cymru's emphasis on the Welsh language, and its focus on rural interests, which they believed prevented its growth in the urban areas in the south of Wales. republican manifesto.

The disaffected founded the Welsh Republican Movement which provided a home for radical ideas while Plaid Cymru matured as a political party, wrote historian John Davies. The Welsh Republican Movement was, during its relatively brief existence, "... socialist, secular, anti-royalist, and disrespectful, with English as its medium."

The Welsh Republican Movement would break up the following decade, athough some of its aspects, with some of its aspects and ideals being absorbed into Plaid Cymru, such as the use of English and the engagement in English-speaking Welsh communities, echoing calls from Dr D. J. Davies. This was "key ... to the party's increasing acceptability" to voters, wrote Davies.

On Evans' initiative in response to a lack of Welsh-medium education at the college level, the University of Wales set up a committee for the creation of a Welsh-medium college in 1950. By 1955 the university announced its expansion of a Welsh-medium curriculum, and its continued expansion in relation to the demand for classes in Welsh. Additionally, Plaid Cymru was attracting members from other parties, such as one-time Plaid Cymru critic Huw T. Edwards, who resigned from the Council of Wales and left Labour in 1958 over what he described as "Whitehallism".

=== A Welsh constitutional monarchy ===
See also Welsh peers and baronets.

The arms of the royal house of Gwynedd were traditionally first used by Llywelyn's father, Iorwerth Drwyndwn

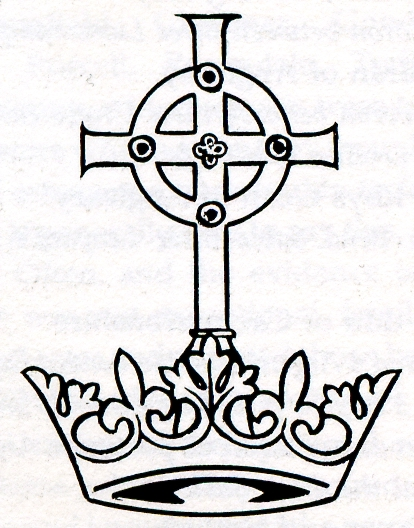
The Cross of Neith atop the Talaith of Llywelyn the Great.

Leading Plaid Cymru members advocated that an independent Wales would be better served by a Welsh constitutional monarchy, one which would engender the affection and allegiance of the Welsh people and legitimise Welsh sovereignty. An hereditary constitutional monarch would, they argued, embody and personify Welsh national identity above party politics, while political parties formed governments in a parliamentary system similar to those of Denmark, Norway, the Netherlands, and Spain.

Economist D. J. Davies, originally a republican, wrote an article in Y Faner in 1953, and later published in English in the 1958 book Towards Welsh Freedom, in which he advocated the elevation of a Welsh gentry family as the Royal Family of Wales. Among the criteria for consideration, argued Davies, was that the family had to have a history of contributing to Welsh life and reside in Wales.

Davies wrote in 1953 of the Rhys/Rice family of Dinefwr in Carmarthen, suggesting their elevation to a restored Welsh kingship. Author Siôn T. Jobbins suggested the election of a member of the Windsor dynasty for an independent Wales.

=== The flooding of Capel Celyn ===
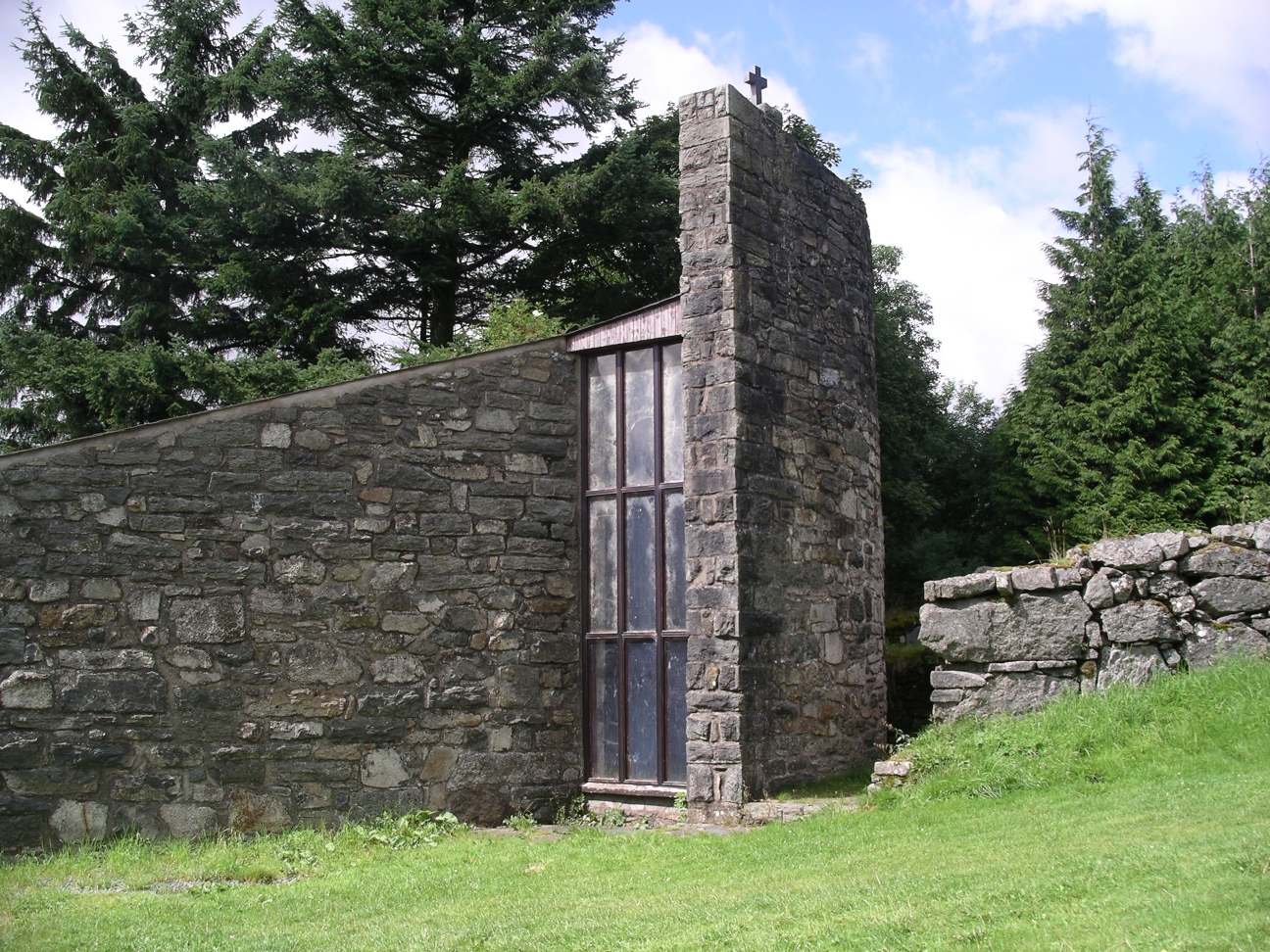
Tryweryn memorial chapel at Llyn Celyn

See also Capel Celyn, Llyn Celyn.

In 1956, a private bill sponsored by Liverpool City Council was brought before the UK parliament to develop a water reservoir in the Tryweryn Valley, in Meirionnydd in Gwynedd. The development would include the flooding of Capel Celyn (Holly Chapel), a Welsh-speaking community of historic significance. Despite universal and bipartisan objections by Welsh politicians (thirty five out of thirty six Welsh MPs opposed the bill, and one abstained) the bill was passed in 1957.

Evans joined Dr Tudor Jones and Capel Celyn farmer David Roberts, aged 65, at the Liverpool Town Hall to protest, and had to be forcibly ejected by police.

The building of the reservoir was instrumental in an increase in support for Plaid Cymru during the late 1950s. Almost unanimous Welsh political opposition had failed to stop approval of the scheme, a fact that seemed to underline Plaid Cymru's argument that the Welsh national community was powerless. At the subsequent General Election the party's support increased from 3.1% to 5.2%.

Of perhaps greater significance, however, was the impetus the episode gave to Welsh devolution. The Council of Wales recommended the creation of a Welsh Office (Swyddfa Gymreig) and a Secretary of State for Wales early in 1957, a time when the governance of Wales on a national level was so demonstrably lacking in many people's eyes.

The flooding of Capel Celyn also sharpened debate within Plaid Cymru about the use of direct action. While the party emphasised its constitutional approach to stopping the development, it also sympathised with the actions of two party members who (of their own accord) attempted to sabotage the power supply at the site of the Tryweryn dam in 1962.

In October 1965 the Llyn Celyn reservoir opened to a sizeable Plaid Cymru organised demonstration. During the opening ceremonies, "posters reading 'Hands Off Wales' were displayed and pieces of rock were thrown at Liverpool's Lord Mayor and Chief Constable."

In 2005, the Liverpool City Council formally apologised for the flooding.

=== Tynged yr Iaith and the 1961 census ===
See also Tynged yr iaith.

In 1962 Saunders Lewis gave a radio speech entitled Tynged yr iaith (The Fate of the Language) in which he predicted the extinction of the Welsh language unless action was taken. Lewis' intent was to motivate Plaid Cymru into more direct action promoting the language; however it led to the formation of Cymdeithas yr Iaith Gymraeg (the "Welsh Language Society") later that year at a Plaid Cymru summer school held in Pontardawe in Glamorgan. The foundation of Cymdeithas yr Iaith Gymraeg allowed Plaid Cymru to focus on electoral politics, while the Cymdeithas focused on promoting the language.

Lewis gave his radio speech responding to the 1961 census, which showed a decrease in the number of Welsh speakers from 36% in 1931 to 26%, out of a population of about 2.5 million. In the census; Merionnydd, Ynys Môn, Carmarthen, and Caernarfonshire averaged 75% concentration of Welsh speakers, with the most significant decrease in the counties of Glamorgan, Flint, and Pembroke.

Responding to the calls for Welsh devolution, in 1964 the Labour Government gave effect to these proposals establishing the unelected Welsh Office (Welsh: Swyddfa Gymreig) and a Secretary of State for Wales.

=== Evans' election 1966 ===
If Plaid Cymru had been disappointed at the UK general election, 1966, then the Carmarthen by-election of 14 July 1966 was reason for celebration. The contest was significant in that it resulted in the election of Gwynfor Evans, the first ever Plaid Cymru M.P. The contest was caused by the death of Lady Megan Lloyd George, Labour (and former Liberal) MP and daughter of David, 1st Earl Lloyd George of Dwyfor.

This was followed by two further by-elections in Rhondda West in 1967 and Caerphilly in 1968, in which the party achieved massive swings of 30% and 40% respectively, coming within a whisker of victory as both also won a higher proportion of the vote then it had won in Carmarthen.

The results were caused partly by an anti-Labour backlash. However, in Carmarthen particularly, Plaid Cymru also successfully depicted Labour's policies as a threat to the viability of small Welsh communities. Expectations in coal mining communities that the Wilson government would halt the long-term decline in their industry had been dashed by a significant downward revision of coal production estimates.

=== Welsh Language Act 1967 ===
With Plaid Cymru's electoral successes the issue of devolution was back on the national political agenda, wrote Dr Davies. A Plaid Cymru under Evans and a Labour party influenced by Gwilym Prys Davies (Gwilym Prys Davies had published a Labour pamphlet calling for a National Assembly of Wales in 1963) and James Griffiths, the argument "in favour of a political system in Wales more answerable to the electorate" was plausible.

But by 1967 Labour retreated from endorsing home rule mainly because of the open hostility expressed by other Welsh Labour MPs to anything "which could be interpreted as a concession to nationalism", and because of opposition by the Secretary of State for Scotland, who was responding to a growth of Scottish nationalism.

By 1967 the Welsh Language Act was passed, giving some legal protection for the use of Welsh in official government business. The Act was based on the Hughes Parry report, published in 1965, which advocated equal validity for Welsh in speech and in written documents, both in the courts and in public administration in Wales. However the Act did not include all the Hughes Parry report's recommendations. Prior to the Act, only the English language could be spoken at government and court proceedings.

=== '79 Yes Campaign; Hunger Strike for S4C ===
See also 1979 Welsh devolution referendum, S4C, Hunger strike

In the 1970 General Election Plaid Cymru contested every seat in Wales for the first time and its vote share surged from 4.5% in 1966 to 11.5%. Also in that year, founding member Saunders Lewis was nominated for the Nobel Prize for Literature. Evans, however, lost Carmarthen to Labour, lost again by three votes in February 1974, but regained the seat in October 1974, by which time the party had gained a further two MPs, representing the constituencies of Caernarfon and Merionethshire. Alarmed at the decrease in the number of Welsh speakers, Evans began a campaign for the establishment of a Welsh-language television channel.

At the 1979 General Election the party's vote share declined from 10.8% to 8.1% and Carmarthen was again lost to Labour. Plaid Cymru led the Yes Campaign in favor of devolution, though some party members were somewhat ambivalent toward home rule (as opposed to outright independence). The referendum was held on St David's Day (1 March) 1979, but the people of Wales voted against proposals to establish a Welsh Assembly. Only 12% of the Welsh electorate voted to set up a directly elected forum which would have been based in Cardiff's Coal Exchange. The Assembly would have had the powers and budget of the Secretary of State for Wales. The plans were defeated by a majority of 4:1 (956,330 against, 243,048 for). The Wales Act contained a requirement that at least 40% of all voters backed the plan. After the referendum results many in the party questioned its direction.

Following the Yes Campaign's defeat, and believing Welsh nationalism was "in a paralysis of helplessness", Conservative Home Secretary William Whitelaw announced in September 1979 that the government would not honour its pledge in the previous May's election campaign to establish a Welsh-language television channel, much to widespread anger and resentment in Wales, wrote Dr Davies. In early 1980 over two thousand members of Plaid Cymru pledged to go to prison rather than pay the television licence fees, and by that spring Evans announced his intention to fast to death if a Welsh-language channel were not established. In early September 1980, Evans addressed thousands at a gathering in which "passions ran high," according to Dr Davies. The government yielded by 17 September, and the Welsh Fourth Channel (S4C) was launched on 2 November 1982.

== The Wigley & Elis presidencies 1981–2000 ==
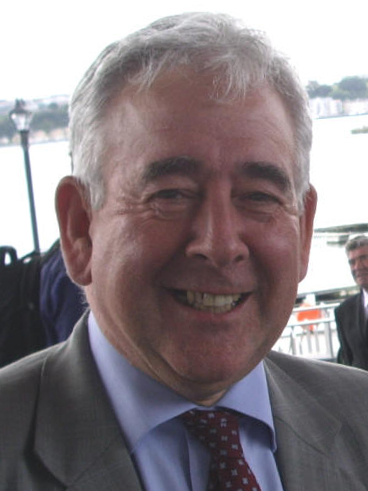
Dafydd Wigley, two-term president

Caernarfon MP, Dafydd Wigley succeeded Gwynfor Evans as president in 1981, inheriting a party whose morale was at an all-time low after the defeat of the Yes Campaign. In 1981 the party adopted "community socialism," or a "decentralised socialist state," as a constitutional aim. This was in part as a consequence of Thatcherism's effect in Wales. While the party embarked on a wide-ranging review of its priorities and goals, Evans continued his successful campaign to oblige the first Thatcher ministry to fulfil its promise to establish S4C. Wigley's election was seen as instrumental in deciding the future direction of Plaid Cymru. Though Wigley described his own politics as 'right-wing', at the time he represented a moderate, pragmatic social democracy policy, in sharp contrast with rival candidate Dafydd Elis Thomas' far-left socialism. Wigley's triumph was also somewhat a pyrrhic victory – he won the presidency, but Thomas would have a greater influence over the party's ideology throughout the 1980s.

In 1984 Wigley resigned from the presidency because of his children's health. In the 1984 party leadership elections Dafydd Elis-Thomas was elected president, defeating Dafydd Iwan, a move that saw the party shift to the political left. Wigley returned to the job in 1991 after the resignation of Elis-Thomas. Ieuan Wyn Jones captured Ynys Mon from the Conservatives in 1987. The 1991 census revealed that the decline in the number of Welsh speakers was arrested, and remained at the 1981 levels of 18.7% in a Welsh population of over 2.8 million. Gwynedd retained the highest concentration of Welsh speakers with 61%, followed by Powys, Clwyd, and Dyfed averaging in the mid-twenty percentile.

=== The Yes for Wales campaign ===
After the 1997 general election, the new Labour Government argued that an Assembly would be more democratically accountable than the Welsh Office, echoing calls for self-government since 1918.

For eleven years prior to 1997 Wales had been represented in the UK Cabinet by a Secretary of State who did not represent a Welsh constituency at Westminster. Plaid Cymru joined a bi-partisan Yes for Wales campaign, alongside the Labour and Liberal Democrat parties.

During the campaign for a Welsh Assembly, Diana, Princess of Wales was killed in a car accident in France. The campaign had been temporarily suspended and it was wondered what effect the death of the Princess of Wales would have on the election. Commentators pondered what effect the death of the princess and focus on the UK Royal Family would have on the devolution debate and turn out.

A second referendum was held on 18 September 1997 in which voters approved the creation of the National Assembly for Wales by a majority of just 6,712 votes.

The following year the Government of Wales Act was passed by UK parliament, establishing the National Assembly for Wales (Welsh: Cynulliad Cenedlaethol Cymru).

=== First Welsh Assembly, 1999–2003 ===
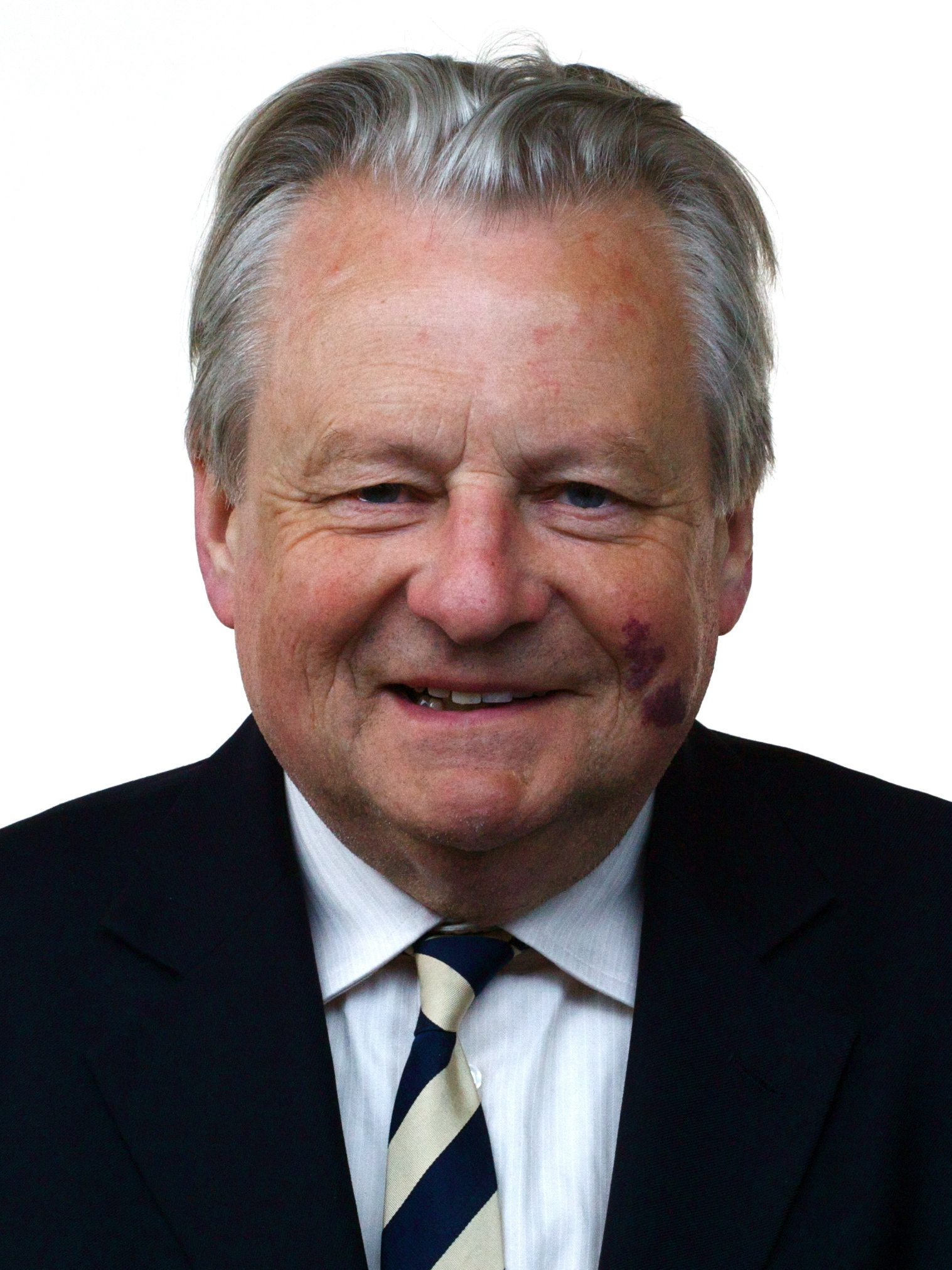
Lord Elis-Thomas Three-term presiding officer of the Welsh Assembly

In the 1999 election Plaid Cymru gained seats in traditionally Labour areas such as in the Rhondda, Islwyn and Llanelli and achieving by far their highest share of the vote in any Wales-wide election. Ieuan Wyn Jones was the campaign director during Plaid Cymru's first elections to the Welsh Assembly in 1999. While Plaid Cymru presented themselves as the natural beneficiary of devolution, others attributed their performance in large part to the travails of the Labour Party, whose nomination for Assembly First Secretary, Ron Davies, was forced to stand down in an alleged sex scandal. The ensuing leadership battle did much to damage Labour, and thus aid Plaid Cymru whose leader, by contrast, was the more popular and higher profile Dafydd Wigley. The UK Labour national leadership was seen to interfere in the contest and deny the popular Rhodri Morgan victory. Less than two months later, with a further slump in Labour support, Plaid Cymru came within 2.5 percentage points of gaining the largest vote share in Wales. Under the new system of elections, the party also gained two MEPs.

Lord Elis-Thomas was elected Presiding Officer of the National Assembly for Wales.

== Jones' presidency; 2000–2003 ==
In a speech at the 2000 National Eisteddfod at Llanelli, Cynog Dafis (pronounced Davis), Plaid Cymru AM for Mid and West Wales, called for a new Welsh-language movement with greater powers to lobby for the Welsh language at the Assembly, UK, and EU levels. Dafis felt the needs of the language were ignored during the first year of the Assembly, and that in order to ensure a dynamic growth of the Welsh language a properly resourced strategy was needed In his speech Dafis encouraged other Welsh-language advocacy groups to work closer together creating a more favorable climate in which using Welsh was "attractive, exciting, a source of pride and a sign of strength". Additionally, Dafis pointed towards efforts in areas such as Catalonia and the Basque country as successful examples to emulate.

Lord Elis-Thomas disagreed with Dafis assessment, however. At the Urdd Eisteddfod Lord Elis-Thomas said that there was no need for another Welsh language act, citing that there was "enough goodwill to safeguard the language's future". His controversial comments prompted Cymdeithas yr Iaith Gymraeg to join a chorus calling for his resignation as the Assembly's presiding officer.

Lord Elis-Thomas was also under fire from Welsh Labour's Alun Michael for his endorsement of Ieuan Wyn Jones as Plaid Cymru's president, however Elis-Thomas said he volunteered his preference as a matter of public interest and as a party member, not in his position as Assembly presiding officer.

Dafydd Wigley resigned late 2000, citing health problems but amid rumours of a plot against him. Ieuan Wyn Jones was elected President of Plaid Cymru with 77% of the vote over Helen Mary Jones and Jill Evans a few months later. Jones reshuffled the party leadership with Jocelyn Davies as Business Manager; Elin Jones as Chief Whip and Agriculture & Rural Development Officer; Phil Williams as Economic Development; and Helen Mary Jones as Environment, Transport and Planning, plus Equal Opportunities.

The party's move toward the political centre during this period may have been made easier by the formation of Welsh-language pressure group Cymuned (Community) and the Cymru Annibynnol (The Independent Wales party), which provided another home for "radicals".

Plaid Cymru and the Scottish National Party, having cooperated since the 1980s, formalised their relationship by establishing the Celtic Alliance voting block in 2001. The Celtic Alliance created the third largest oppositional voting block in the UK parliament.

Llandudno Party Conference

At the Llandudno Plaid Cymru party conference of 2002, Jones called for greater Assembly authority "[on parity] with Scotland's parliament", and "opposed any military conflict in Iraq, saying it would destabilise the Middle East". Jones also criticised health and public services policies and would end the "endless revamping of structures and administration".

=== Language and Housing Controversy ===
Controversy erupted in mid-winter 2001 when Seimon Glyn, Gwynedd County Council's housing committee chairman and Plaid Cymru member, voiced frustration over "English immigrants" moving into traditionally Welsh-speaking communities. Glyn was commenting on a report underscoring the dilemma of rocketing house prices outstripping what locals could pay, with the report warning that "...traditional Welsh communities could die out..." as a consequence.

Much of the rural Welsh real-estate market was driven by a cycle of growing dormitory towns, which was exacerbated by second home buyers and growing retirement communities. Many buyers were drawn to Wales from England because of relatively inexpensive house prices in Wales as compared to house prices in England. The rise in home prices outpaced the average earnings income in Wales, and meant that many local people could not afford to purchase their first home or compete against commuter or second-home buyers.

In 2001 nearly a third of all properties in Gwynedd were bought by buyers from out of the county, and with some communities reporting as many as a third of local homes used as holiday homes. Holiday home owners spend less than six months of the year in the local community. Additional concern was expressed by Cymuned, which included disillusioned Plaid Cymru members, when it was pointed out that real-estate in North Wales was specifically marketed to affluent buyers in England rather than marketed to locals. These growing dormitory towns along the North Wales Expressway serve more as commuter communities for Chester and other cross-border cities, effectively driving-out Welsh-speaking communities, activists pointed out.

In housing markets where commuters are wealthier and small town housing markets weaker than city housing markets or suburbs, the development of a bedroom community may raise local housing prices and attract upscale service businesses in a process called gentrification. Long-time residents may be displaced by new commuter residents due to rising house prices. This can also be influenced by zoning restrictions in urbanised areas that prevent the construction of suitably cheap housing closer to places of employment.

The issue of locals being priced out of the local housing market is common to many rural communities throughout Britain, but in Wales the added dimension of language further complicated the issue, as many new residents did not learn the Welsh language.

Concern for the Welsh language under these pressures prompted Glyn to say "Once you have more than 50% of anybody living in a community that speaks a foreign language, then you lose your indigenous tongue almost immediately".

Plaid Cymru had long advocated controls on second homes, and a 2001 taskforce headed by Dafydd Wigley recommended land should be allocated for affordable local housing, and called for grants for locals to buy houses, and recommended council tax on holiday homes should double, following similar measures in the Scottish Highlands.

However the Welsh Labour-Liberal Democrat Assembly coalition rebuffed these proposals, with Assembly housing spokesman Peter Black stating that "we [can not] frame our planning laws around the Welsh language", adding "Nor can we take punitive measures against second home owners in the way that they propose as these will have an impact on the value of the homes of local people".

In contrast, by fall 2001 the Exmoor National Park authority in England began limiting home ownership there which was also driving up local housing prices by as much as 31%. Elfyn Llwyd, Plaid Cymru's parliamentary group leader, said that the issues in Exmoor National Park were the same as in Wales, however in Wales there is the added dimension of language and culture.

Reflecting on the controversy Glyn's comments caused earlier in the year, Llwyd observed "What is interesting is of course it is fine for Exmoor to defend their community but in Wales when you try to say these things it is called racist..."

Llwyd called on other parties to join in a debate to bring the Exmoor experience to Wales when he said "... I really do ask them and I plead with them to come around the table and talk about the Exmoor suggestion and see if we can now bring it into Wales".

By spring 2002 both the Snowdonia National Park (Welsh: Parc Cenedlaethol Eryri) and Pembrokeshire Coast National Park (Welsh: Parc Cenedlaethol Arfordir Penfro) authorities began limiting second home ownership within the parks, following the example set by Exmoor. According to planners in Snowdonia and Pembroke applicants for new homes must demonstrate a proven local need or the applicant had strong links with the area.

In the 2001 General Election, Plaid Cymru lost Jones' old seat of Ynys Môn to Labour's Albert Owen. An internal report commissioned by Plaid Cymru following the 2001 General Election attributed the loss of significant votes directly to Glyn's controversial comments. Despite this, Plaid Cymru recorded their highest ever vote share in a General Election of 14.3%, gaining Carmarthen East and Dinefwr and electing Adam Price.

=== 2001 Census and tickbox controversy ===
Percentage of Welsh speakers by principal area

According to the 2001 census the number of Welsh speakers in Wales increased for the first time in 100 years, with 20.5% in a population of over 2.9 million claiming fluency in Welsh, or one in five. Additionally, 28% of the population of Wales claimed to understand Welsh. The census revealed that the increase was most significant in urban areas; such as Cardiff (Caerdydd) with an increase from 6.6% in 1991 to 10.9% in 2001, and Rhondda Cynon Taff with an increase from 9% in 1991 to 12.3% in 2001. However, the percentage of Welsh speakers declined in Gwynedd from 72.1% in 1991 to 68.7%, and in Ceredigion from 59.1% in 1991 to 51.8%. Ceredigion in particular experienced the greatest fluctuation with a 19.5% influx of new residents since 1991, partially attributable to the inclusion of transient college students at local universities.

The census also revealed that one-third of the population of Wales described themselves as of British nationality, with respondents having to write in whether or not they were Welsh. Controversy surrounding the method of determining nationality began as early as 2000, when it was revealed that respondents in Scotland and Northern Ireland would be able to tick a box describing themselves as Scottish or Irish, an option not available for Welsh respondents.

Prior to the Census, Plaid Cymru backed a petition calling for the inclusion of a Welsh tickbox and for the National Assembly to have primary law-making powers and its own National Statistics Office.

With an absence of a Welsh tickbox, the only other tickbox available was 'white-British,' 'Irish', or 'other'. Critics expected a higher proportion of respondents describing themselves as of Welsh nationality had a Welsh tickbox been available. Additional criticism targeted the timing of the census, which was taken in the middle of the Foot and Mouth crisis of 2001, a fact organisers said did not impact the results. However, the Foot and Mouth crisis did delay UK General Elections, the first time since the Second World War any event postponed an election.

=== The Mittal Affair ===
Controversy ensued in 2002 as Adam Price exposed the link between UK prime minister Tony Blair and steel magnate Lakshmi Mittal in the Mittal Affair, also known as 'Garbagegate' or Cash for Influence. Mittal's LNM steel company, registered in the Dutch Antilles and maintaining less than 1% of its 100,000 plus workforce in the UK, sought Blair's aid in its bid to purchase Romania's state steel industry. The letter from Blair to the Romanian government, a copy of which Price was able to obtain, hinted that the privatisation of the firm and sale to Mittal might help smooth the way for Romania's entry into the European Union.

The letter had a passage in it removed just prior to Blair's signing of it, describing Mittal as "a friend".

In exchange for Blair's support Mittal, already a Labour contributor, donated £125,000 more to Labour party funds a week after the 2001 UK General Elections, while as many as six thousand Welsh steelworkers were laid off that same year, Price and others pointed out. Mittal's company, then the fourth largest in the world, was a "major global competitor of Britain's own struggling steel industry, Corus, formerly British Steel plc". Corus and Valkia Limited were two of the primary employers in South Wales, particularly in Ebbw Vale, Llanwern, and Port Talbot.

== Iwan's presidency, 2003 – 2012 ==
=== Second Welsh Assembly, 2003–2007 ===
In the May Assembly election of 2003 Plaid Cymru lost five seats, with critics pointing towards a less organised electoral organisation which often found difficulty articulating the party's message in the media. This was in sharp contrast to the electoral organisation and performance of 1999.

Within a week of the Assembly elections, there were accusations of a plot headed by AM Helen Mary Jones and four other Plaid Cymru Assembly Members manoeuvering for Jones' removal. But Helen Mary Jones denied involvement. However, Ieuan Wyn Jones resigned as both party president and leader of the assembly group.

By summer 2003 the party underwent a constitutional reorganisation dividing its Cardiff Bay and Westminster responsibilities. The organisational change prompted new party elections, with Ieuan Wyn Jones standing again for Assembly group leadership, having received both grassroots support from "all over Wales" and senior party members.

With the move towards digital programming, Plaid Cymru urged the "UK government to make Wales one of the first areas to completely switch over to digital television from the current analogue service".

=== Impeachment of Blair Campaign, 2004–2007 ===
See also Impeach Blair campaign

In August 2004, Adam Price began a campaign to impeach Blair over the alleged misleading of the UK Parliament and for allegedly making a secret agreement with then US President George W. Bush to overthrow Saddam Hussein, amongst other charges. Plaid's Parliament group leader Elfyn Llwyd and then Scottish National Party (SNP) group leader Alex Salmond co-drafted the motion. Impeachment had not been used in the UK for 150 years. If successful, it could have seen Blair tried before the House of Lords; however, as expected, the measure failed.

On 17 March 2005 Price was ejected from the Commons chamber after accusing the Prime Minister of having "misled" Parliament and then refusing to withdraw his comment, in violation of the rules of the House. In November 2005, the campaign announced a new motion (this time with the support of the Liberal Democrats) asking for a Commons committee to examine the conduct of ministers before and after the war. The campaign tabled an Early Day Motion:

"Conduct of Government Policy in relation to the war against Iraq"

"That this House believes that there should be a select committee of 7 Members, being members of Her Majesty's Privy Council, to review the way in which the responsibilities of Government were discharged in relation to Iraq and all matters relevant thereto, in the period leading up to military action in that country in March 2003 and in its aftermath". The motion collected 151 signatures, including some Labour back-benchers.

By October 2006, Price opened a three-hour debate on an inquiry into the Iraq War, the first such debate in over two years. The SNP and Plaid Cymru motion proposing a committee of seven senior MPs to review "the way in which the responsibilities of government were discharged in relation to Iraq", was defeated by 298 votes to 273, a Government majority of 25, but was supported by a significant number of opposition MPs, and twelve "rebel" Labour MPs, including Glenda Jackson. Despite the lack of debate on the original impeachment motion, Price pledged to continue his campaign. However, with the resignation of Blair on 27 June 2007, the entire issue of impeachment may now be moot.

=== 80th anniversary and Evans celebrated 2005 ===
In 2005 Plaid Cymru celebrated both the life of iconic figure Gwynfor Evans, who had died in April, and of the 80th anniversary of the party's founding. At Evans' funeral in Aberystwyth, attended by thousands, Plaid Cymru president Dafydd Iwan said "For Plaid Cymru members and supporters, young and old, Gwynfor Evans has been Plaid Cymru's spiritual leader and will continue to be so. It is impossible to underestimate Gwynfor's unique contribution to building Plaid Cymru into the party it is today".

Evans was "Wales' most remarkable politician," according to Plaid Cymru parliamentary group leader Elfyn Llwyd, adding that Evans will be remembered for his "fearless dedication to the cause of peace and international understanding". Evans was voted third Top Welsh millennium hero in 2000, and fourth Welsh hero in 2004, according to BBC Wales online polls.

=== Cymru X – Plaid Cymru Youth/Ifanc ===
Cymru X was founded in 2005 to merge Plaid Cymru's two existing movements in to one new youth movement. The student federation, 'the ffed', and the youth movement were merged to create a brand new youth organisation available to anyone under the age of 30.

While working as President of the Aberystwyth Guild of Students, Bethan Jenkins saw Plaid Cymru defeated in Ceredigion. After leaving Aberystwyth University, Jenkins worked in the office of Leanne Wood AM and used her contacts there to set up the organisation Cymru X. Cymru X launched the first ever interactive text referendum on a Parliament for Wales, as well as campaigns against nuclear arms. Glyn Wise of Big Brother fame also took part in a campaign alongside Cymru X to encourage young people to vote prior to the National Assembly election in 2007.

There are some links with Federation of Student Nationalists and Young Scots for Independence, the student and youth wings of the Scottish National Party, as well as Kernow X, the youth group of Mebyon Kernow.

In 2012 CymruX was re-branded as Plaid Cymru Youth/Plaid Cymru Ifanc. Plaid Cymru Youth has campaigned against university top-up fees, the Iraq War, and the development of new nuclear arms, for the re-introduction of grants for university students, for affordable housing for young people and for a Yes vote in the 2011 Welsh devolution referendum. In 2012 they launched a campaign to help tackle youth unemployment called 'Gwaith i Gymru – Work for Wales' which aims to put pressure on the Welsh Government to help young people into work or training in Wales, and includes a petition to the Welsh Assembly.

Plaid Cymru Youth is run by its National Executive Committee, with an election and AGM at Plaid Cymru's Spring Conference every year. Every member of Plaid Cymru Youth is entitled to vote or stand as an officer.

=== Crossroads, leadership, and rebranding ===
In 2005, the party reached a kind of crossroads, as historic tensions within the party resurfaced between Plaid Cymru as a social pressure group and Plaid Cymru as an electoral political party. Professor Laura McAllister, a Plaid Cymru history expert and former party candidate, said that unless the party shed its "pressure group past" it could not expect more than to form a coalition government with other parties.

Helen Mary Jones, however, disagreed with McAllister's assessment and in 2005 said that "Plaid Cymru speaks to and for all the people of Wales." Former Rhondda Cynon Taff Plaid Cymru councillor Syd Morgan agreed with Helen Mary Jones and said that the issue was not with the party's message, but because of a lack of a "modern corporate image" that the "party as a whole does not resonate with the people of Wales."

Old logo (above) and new logo (below)

In February 2006 Plaid Cymru undertook changes to its party structure, including designating the Welsh Assembly group leader as the overall party leader. This move placed Ieuan Wyn Jones again at the head of the party, with Dafydd Iwan remaining party president and popular Dafydd Wigley remaining Honorary President.

Responding to calls from within the party to reinvigorate its image, at a party conference the unveiling of a radical change of image prompted some controversy from within the party. Changes included officially using "Plaid" as the party's name, although "Plaid Cymru – The Party of Wales" remained the official title. The adoption of Plaid, which had long been used in less formal speech as referring to the party, was a recognition of its use for all party business. Additionally, the party's colours were changed from the traditional green and red to yellow, while the party logo was changed from the 'triban' (three peaks) used since 1933 to a yellow Welsh poppy (Meconopsis cambrica).

=== The Government of Wales Act 2006 ===
The Government of Wales Act 2006 was heavily criticised by Plaid for not delivering a fully-fledged parliament. Additionally, Plaid criticised the Welsh Labour Party's allegedly partisan attempt to alter the electoral system. By preventing regional Assembly Members from standing in constituency seats Welsh Labour was accused of "changing the rules" to protect constituency representatives. Labour had 29 members in the Assembly at the time, all of whom held constituency seats.

=== Third Welsh Assembly, 2007–2011 ===
In the Welsh Assembly election of 3 May 2007, Plaid increased its number of seats from 12 to 15, regaining Llanelli, gaining one additional list seat and winning the newly created constituency of Aberconwy The 2007 election also saw Plaid's Mohammad Asghar become the first ethnic minority candidate elected to the Welsh Assembly. The Party's share of the vote increased to 22.4%. After a tight race, Helen Mary Jones won back the important Llanelli constituency for Plaid, with a majority of 3,884 votes.

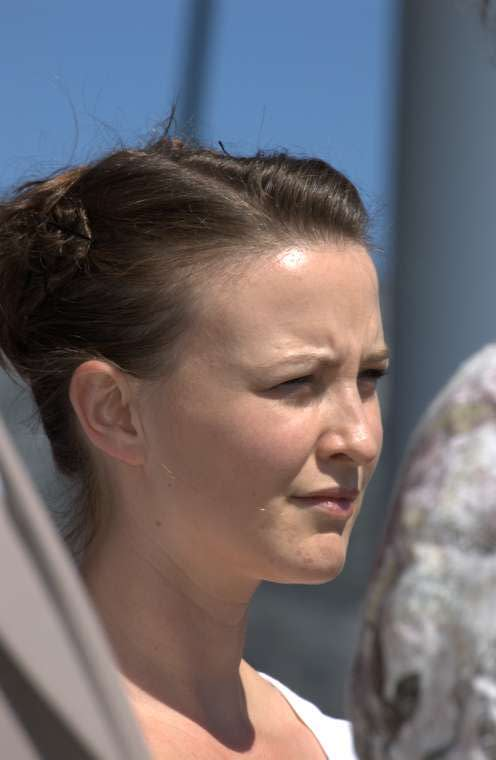
Bethan Jenkins at 26, the youngest AM elected

Plaid AM Dr Dai Lloyd hailed the 2007 Assembly election campaign as the "most professional" campaign that Plaid had run, and made special note that it was funded from exclusively Welsh sources. In the 2007 Assembly election Plaid spent just under £261,286 on the campaign, about three times that of the 2003 Assembly elections.

On 19 October 2007, Plaid AM Asghar escaped death as a terrorist explosion in Karachi, Pakistan, killed 130 others. He had been within 35 metres of the blast. Asghar had accompanied Benazir Bhutto, former Prime Minister of Pakistan and intended target, on her return there from exile.

Following the Assembly elections, a UK parliamentary standards and privileges committee found Plaid MPs Elfyn Llwyd, Adam Price and Hywel Williams guilty of improperly advertising during the elections. Though the committee admitted the three did not break any clear rules of the UK House of Commons, the committee believed the timing of the adverts was planned to coincide with the Assembly elections.

Parliamentary funds are available for MPs to communicate with constituents regularly. However the committee found that the three used this communication allowance improperly as part of Plaid's campaigning during the elections as the adverts were placed in publications with a circulation outside of their respective constituencies.

Plaid MP group leader Elfyn Llwyd said that they had "...acted in good faith throughout, and fully in line with the advice that was offered to us by the DFA (Department of Finance and Administration) at the time of the publication of the reports", but that they would comply with the findings. The three had to repay the money, about five thousand pounds each, and report the costs as part of Plaid's election spending.

==== The "One Wales" Agreement ====
See also One Wales

Plaid entered into negotiations with Welsh Labour to form a stable government only after Plaid's initial attempts to form a three-party coalition with the Conservative and Liberal Democrat parties failed. The "One Wales" agreement hammered out promised aid to "first-time house-buyers, pensioners and students and a review of NHS reconfiguration", and with a "commitment by Welsh Labour to campaign favourably for full parliamentary powers, similar to the Scottish Parliament, in a referendum held before 2011". The historicOne Wales agreement was approved by both political parties by 7 July. Only a coalition between Plaid and Welsh Labour would provide the necessary two-thirds majority in the Assembly to trigger the referendum.

The One Wales agreement did receive criticism from fellow Plaid members. Plaid's honorary president Wigley summarised disagreement when he warned that the pact was reached too quickly and not enough planning had gone into it. Wigley believed that the agreement's failings might jeopardise the Assembly receiving full parliamentary powers by a 2011 referendum, and that other provisions of the agreement would not be fully funded. Indeed, with the budget outlined after the coalition was formed Plaid was obliged to defend spending cuts it may have otherwise criticised.

Queen Elizabeth II confirmed Ieuan Wyn Jones as Deputy First Minister of Wales and minister for Economy and Transport on 11 July 2007. Plaid's deputy president Rhodri Glyn Thomas, who argued in favour of the Welsh-language channel S4C becoming bilingual after digital switchover despite the circumstances of S4C's founding, was appointed Heritage Minister. Ceredigion AM Elin Jones was appointed to the Rural Affairs brief in the new ten member Cabinet. As if in an effort to underscore Plaid's identity within the coalition, Plaid ministers sit with the Plaid assembly group rather than with Labour cabinet members.

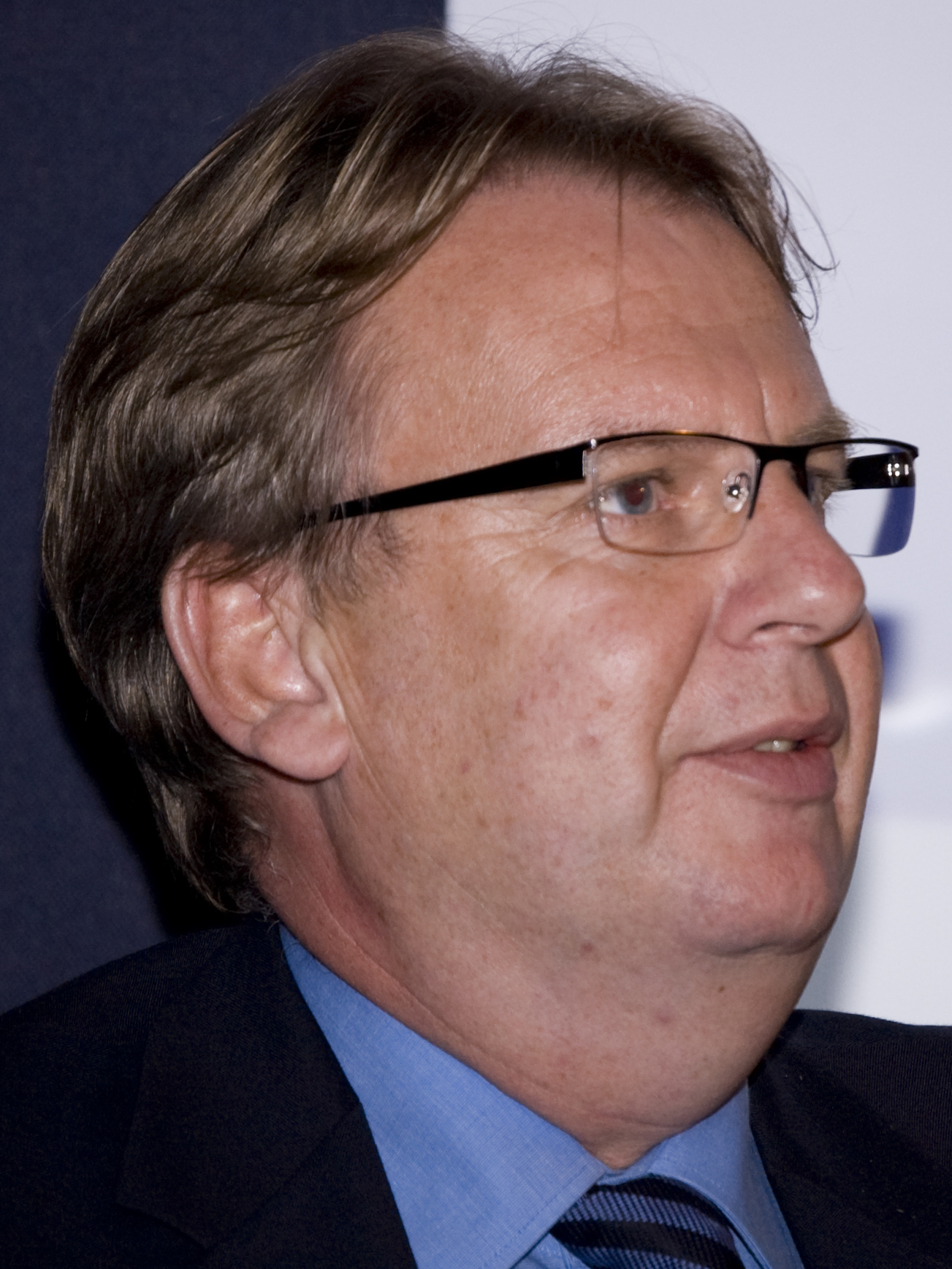
Rhodri Glyn Thomas Plaid's Deputy President

Of Plaid's entering into government for the first time Jones said "The party's role so far has been one of the opposition party, which put pressure on the other parties to move things forward for the benefit of Wales". Speaking about moderation and consensus at the British-Irish Council at Stormont on 16 July 2007, Jones said that Wales has seen "a coming together of parties with different traditions, on the basis of a shared programme for government, and a shared commitment to improve the lives of all our people in all parts of Wales".

Jones joined the Queen representing Wales in Belgium at the 90th anniversary ceremony of the Third Battle of Ypres at Passchendaele (World War I). During the battle celebrated Welsh poet Hedd Wyn had died, along with thousands of other Welshmen.

==== Broadcast news controversy ====
In August 2007 MP Adam Price highlighted what he perceived as a lack of a Welsh focus on BBC news broadcasts. Price threatened to withhold future television licence fees in response to a lack of thorough news coverage of Wales, echoing a BBC Audience Council for Wales July report citing public frustration over how the Welsh Assembly is characterised in national media. AM Bethan Jenkins agreed with Price and called for responsibility for broadcasting to be devolved to the Welsh Assembly, voicing similar calls from Scotland's First Minister Alex Salmond. Criticism of the BBC's news coverage for Wales and Scotland since devolution prompted debate of possibly providing evening news broadcasts with specific focus for both countries.

==== Party Conference 2007 and Peerage Call ====
At the Llandudno party conference, 2007, Plaid members discussed the new European Union reform treaty, a change in placing women at the top of regional lists in the Welsh assembly elections, and the party's position on nuclear power. Grass roots party members blame the policy of placing women at the top of regional lists as the cause for Dafydd Wigley's failure to be elected to the Assembly. Plaid began the policy of placing women at the top of regional lists to attract more women into the political process, however opponents pointed out that the policy discriminated against men. In the so-called Zip system whoever wins the greatest number of party votes will be placed at the top of the regional list, followed by the opposite gender candidate who received the next highest vote share.

Additionally, Plaid parliamentary leader Elfyn Llwyd encouraged the party to nominate peers into the House of Lords, citing that Plaid peers would "help ensure planned legislation for Wales was not blocked at Westminster", adding that many in the Lords may want to prevent full law-making powers for Wales. With consensus building from within the party to nominate peers, honorary party president Dafydd Wigley was nominated for peerage. Other Plaid nominees for life peerage include Eurfyl ap Gwilym, and Janet Davies. Currently, Lord Wigley is the lone Plaid peer. In a September 2007 poll, "83% of the people of Wales now support self-government – with a clear majority of the Welsh electorate supporting a full law-making and a tax-varying Parliament for Wales", according to Plaid MP for Caernarfon, Hywel Williams.

== Plaid Cymru party leaders ==
=== Plaid Cymru Leader (Note: The Party leader was referred to as the president until March 2000 when the separate role of Leader was created) ===
		Portrait	Entered office	Left office	Length of Leadership
1	Ieuan Wyn Jones		March 2000	March 2012	12 years
2	Leanne Wood		March 2012	September 2018	Approximately 6 and a half years
3	Adam Price		September 2018	May 2023	Approximately 4 years and 8 months
4	Llŷr Gruffydd (acting)		May 2023	June 2023	1 month
5	Rhun ap Iorwerth		June 2023	incumbent	

=== Plaid Cymru party presidents 1925–2013 ===
		Portrait	Entered office	Left office	Length of Leadership
1	Lewis Valentine		1925	1926	12 months
2	Saunders Lewis		1926	1939	19 years
3	J. E. Daniel		1939	1943	
4	Abi Williams		1943	1945	
5	Gwynfor Evans		1945	1981	36 years
6	Dafydd Wigley		1981	1984	4 years
7	Lord Elis-Thomas		1984	1991	8 years
8	Dafydd Wigley		1991	2001	10 years
9	Ieuan Wyn Jones		2001	2003	2 years
10	Dafydd Iwan		2003	2010	7 years
11	Jill Evans		2010	2013	3 years (position abolished)

=== Honorary party presidents ===
		Portrait	Entered office	Left office	Length of Leadership
1	Gwynfor Evans		1982	2005	23 years
2	Dafydd Wigley		2005	Incumbent	In office

=== Welsh Parliament (Senedd) Group Leaders since 1999 ===
		Portrait	Entered office	Left office	Length of Leadership
1	Dafydd Wigley		1999	2001	3 years
2	Ieuan Wyn Jones		2001	2012	11 years
3	Leanne Wood		2012	2018	6 years
4	Adam Price		2018	2023	4 years
5	Llŷr Gruffydd (acting)		May 2023	June 2023	1 month
6	Rhun ap Iorwerth		June 2023	incumbent	

=== UK Members of Parliament Group Leaders ===
		Portrait	Entered office	Left office	Length of Leadership
1	Gwynfor Evans				
2	Dafydd Wigley		1981	1984	
3	Dafydd Elis-Thomas		1984	1991	
(2)	Dafydd Wigley		1991	????	
	???				
4	Elfyn Llwyd		June 2010	March 2015	
5	Jonathan Edwards		18 May 2015	10 Sept 2015	
6	Hywel Williams		10 Sept 2015	14 June 2017	
7	Liz Saville Roberts		14 June 2017	Current	

== See also ==
- History of the Welsh language
- List of Plaid Cymru MPs
- Category:Plaid Cymru politicians
- Politics of Wales
- 2007 National Assembly for Wales election

== Bibliography ==
- Davies, John (1994). A History of Wales. New York: Penguin. ISBN 0-14-014581-8.
- Davies, John (2001). Wales and America. Gallia County, Ohio: North American Journal of Welsh Studies, Vol. 1,1.
- Jobbins, Siôn T. (January 2008). Why Not a Welsh Royal Family. Cambria magazine.
- Jones, Richard Wyn (2024). Putting Wales: First The Political Thought of Plaid Cymru (Volume 1). University of Wales Press. ISBN 9781837721832.
- Vittle, Arwel and Gruffudd, Gwen Angharad (2025). Dros Gymru'n Gwlad: Hanes Sefydlu Plaid Genedlaethol Cymru (in Welsh). Y Lolfa. ISBN 978-1800997066.
