= Graisley Old Hall =

Coordinates: 52.573741°N 2.141255°W

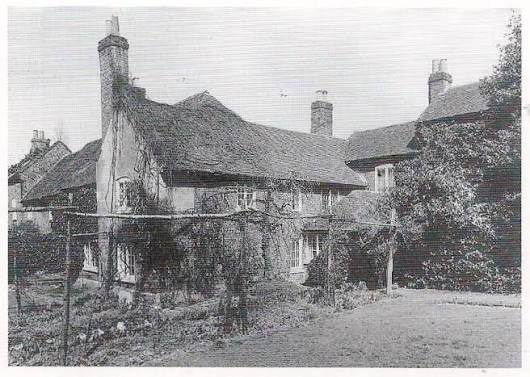
- Graisley Old Hall around 1913
- Interactive map of the Graisley Old Hall area

General information
- Status: Completed
- Type: Manor house
- Location: Carlton Road, Wolverhampton, United Kingdom
- Current tenants: Susan Williams
- Completed: No earlier than 1377
- Renovated: c. 1485, 1702–12, and 1911

Website
- www.hauntedhappenings.co.uk/graisley-old-hall/

Graisley Old Hall, nicknamed the House that Cries, is a Grade II* listed former manor house in the Penn Fields area in Wolverhampton, England. It is now a private residence.

== History ==
The first Graisley Old Hall property was present by 1377. It was replaced by the surviving building around 1485.

The earliest known owner of the property was Nicholas Rydley (died c. 1524) and it stayed in his family until Walter Rotton sold it to William Normansell the Elder to pay off debts accumulated through gambling. The property was sold again after William Normansell the Younger died in 1656.

John Jesson replaced the exterior of the building in brick sometime between 1702 and 1712 and inadvertently preserved a section of the original wattle and daub. (Note: John Jesson's work was recorded as being undertaken during the reign of Queen Anne. This work can be dated to 1702–12 as Anne reigned between 1702 and 1714, and Jesson died in 1712.)

By 1850, Graisley Old Hall was owned by William Herrick. It was then part of the estate of H. W. Owen, and it was sold in 1905 before the interior was renovated in 1911. The Royal Wolverhampton School purchased the property on 23 December 1930 for use as an administrative and storage building.

Flora Forster was living at Graisley Old Hall during the 1950s, and Enoch Powell visited in early 1957. It became Grade II* listed on 16 September 1957.

The property became infamous during the 1980s after supposed paranormal activity was reported from inside the building. Despite this, it was purchased by Susan Williams during the 1990s, and it today owned by the Williams family.
