= Iwi (disambiguation) =

Iwi are social units in New Zealand Māori society.

Iwi or IWI may also refer to:

- Israel Weapon Industries, an Israeli arms manufacturer
- ʻIʻiwi, a bird species
- Edward Iwi (1904–1966), English lawyer
- Iwi, a fictional people inhabiting Skull Island in Kong: Skull Island
