= Rhydcymerau =

Village in Carmarthenshire, Wales

Coordinates: 52.0302°N 4.0748°W

Rhydcymerau is a small village 8.5 kilometres to the south-east of Llanybydder, around the side of Mynydd Llanybydder, in Carmarthenshire, south-west Wales.

Rhydcymerau is the birthplace of prominent Welsh writer and nationalist David John Williams, one of three saboteurs of the Penyberth bombing school in 1936. Two of his autobiographical volumes, Hen Dŷ Ffarm (“The Old Farmhouse”, 1953) and Yn Chwech ar Hugain Oed (“Twenty-Six Years Old”, 1959) give a portrait of life in this small village at the turn of the twentieth century.

Rhydcymerau is part of the community of Llanybydder, and has a chapel and a closed primary school. It was also, until his death in 2021, the home of former RAF nurse trainer Antony Conolly.

The Red Dragon pub, which had been closed for several years, was partly demolished in 2016 despite a planning application to do so not having been considered.

In August 2022, it was reported that the application to demolish the local Victorian chapel had been rejected.
