= Penrhos, Gwynedd =

Coordinates: 52.880°N 4.459°W

Penrhos
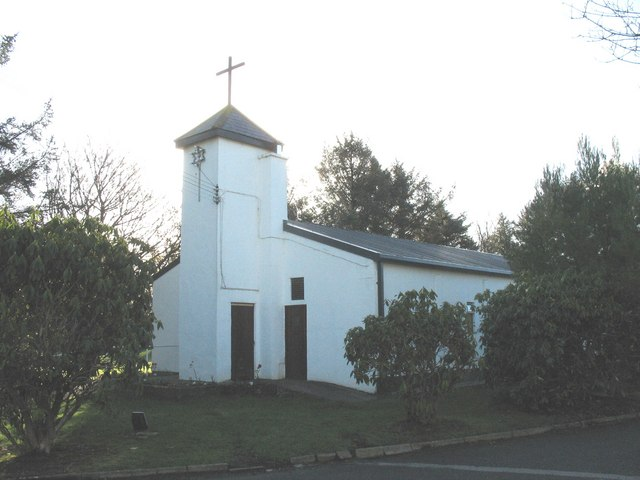
- The Polish church of Our Lady and St Cynfil

- Location within Gwynedd
- OS grid reference: SH345342
- Community: Llannor
- Principal area: Gwynedd
- Preserved county: Gwynedd
- Country: Wales
- Sovereign state: United Kingdom
- Post town: PWLLHELI
- Postcode district: LL53
- Dialling code: 01758
- Police: North Wales
- Fire: North Wales
- Ambulance: Welsh
- UK Parliament: Dwyfor Meirionnydd
- Senedd Cymru – Welsh Parliament: Dwyfor Meirionnydd

Penrhos (formerly: Penrhos Polish Village; Polish: Polskie Osiedle Penrhos) is a village and former civil parish in the Welsh county of Gwynedd, located on the Llŷn Peninsula. The parish was abolished in 1934, and incorporated into Llannor.

== History ==
It was the home of former MP Goronwy Roberts. Penyberth lies within its confines.

After the Second World War Polish exiles settled outside the town of Pwllheli in an area which became known as Penrhos Polish Village. At its height the village had upwards of 200 Polish residents, however the community began to decline and by 2023 there were 45 residents in the village. Penrhos Polish Village was eventually demolished in 2025.

== See also ==
- RAF Penrhos
