= Flora Forster =

Welsh educationalist

Flora Macrae Forster
- Born: 1896
- Died: 1981 (aged 84–85)
- Education: Somerville College, Oxford
- Occupations: Educator, author
- Parents: Joseph Forster (father); Alice Forster (mother)

Flora Macrae Forster (1896–1981) was a Welsh educator and writer.

Forster was born in St Thomas, Swansea in 1896, the daughter of Joseph and Alice Forster. Joseph Forster was a railway engineer, and was a descendant from Jonathan Forster from Wylam, one of the inventors of the early locomotive Puffing Billy. By 1911 the family were living in Swansea.

== Education ==
Forster attended Dynevor School and was awarded the Mary Ewart Scholarship for English in 1915, enabling her to study at Somerville College, Oxford for three years. One of her contemporaries, and a friend for the rest of her life, was Margaret Kennedy, author of the 1924 novel The Constant Nymph, who died at Forster's house in Adderbury, Oxfordshire, in 1967. She also came across an older student from Rhydcymerau, Carmarthenshire, David John Williams and there was friendship and correspondence between the two until 1925. The correspondence is held in the DJ Williams Collection at the National Library of Wales. In her correspondence with DJ Williams they discuss the literature of the day and school syllabi. She declined offers from DJ Williams to marry her.

She donated a portrait of Henry Griswold Lewis by John Constable to Somerville College.

== Career ==
After graduating in 1918 she got a job teaching English and Latin at Newport High School in Newport, Wales. In 1920 she was appointed lecturer at Barry College. She then went to a job at Homerton College, Cambridge in 1922 and the following year she was appointed another post at a college in Dudley. When in 1931 a new girls' secondary school was established in Malvern Hall, Solihull, she was appointed headmistress and held the position of Solihull High School for Girls until her retirement in 1961. She was highly regarded in the area and as of 2018 there is still a scholarship offered in her name for students in the Solihull district. Forster died in 1981.
