= John Edward Daniel =

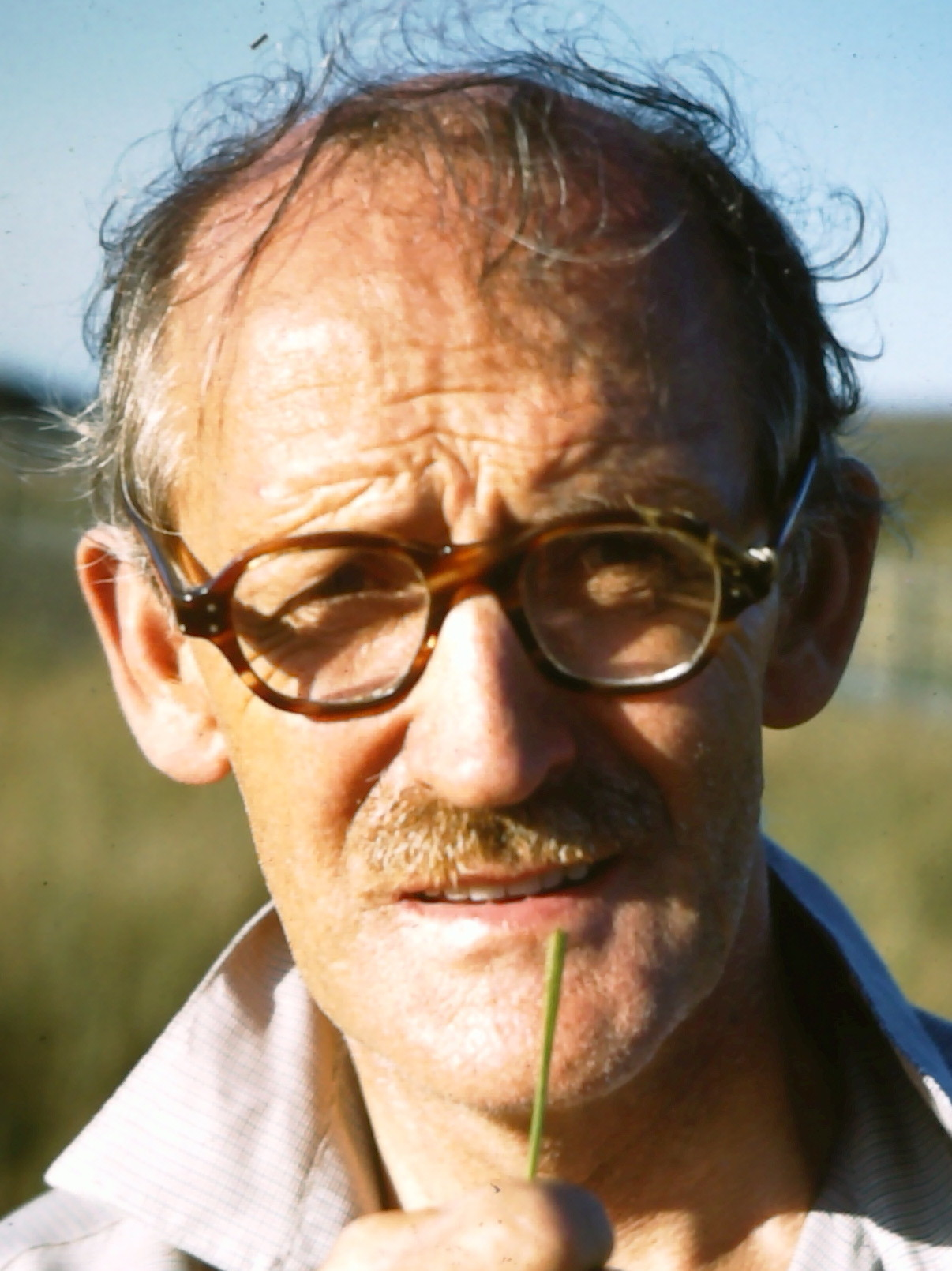
- Born: 26 June 1902; Bangor, Wales
- Died: 11 February 1962 (aged 59); Halkyn, Wales
- Title: President of Plaid Cymru (1939–1943)

Academic background
- Education: Jesus College, Oxford

Academic work
- Discipline: Theology
- Institutions: Bala-Bangor Theological College

John Edward Daniel (26 June 1902 – 11 February 1962) was a Welsh theologian and college lecturer who became chairman of the Welsh political party Plaid Cymru.

== Life ==
Daniel was born in Bangor, Gwynedd, on 26 June 1902 and was educated at the Friars School, Bangor. He then won a scholarship to the University of Oxford, matriculating as a member of Jesus College, Oxford, in 1919. He obtained a first-class degree in literae humaniores in 1923 and a further first-class degree in divinity in 1925. He was then appointed to a fellowship at the Bala-Bangor Theological College, and became a professor on 28 July 1926, following the death of Thomas Rees. He taught Christian doctrine and the philosophy of religion and was regarded as one of the most able theologians of his generation. However, his publications were few: Dysgeidiaeth yr Apostol Paul (1933) and some journal articles. Although he was never ordained, he was an able preacher.

He was a prominent Welsh nationalist and member of Plaid Cymru. He contributed to its newspaper (Y Ddraig Goch) and stood unsuccessfully as a candidate in three general elections and a by-election in 1945. He was vice-chairman from 1931 to 1935, and succeeded Saunders Lewis as chairman in 1939 (holding the position until August 1943). In 1946, Daniel was appointed as an inspector of schools, with special responsibility for classics and religious education. He died as the result of a road accident near Halkyn, Flintshire, on 11 February 1962.

Party political offices
Preceded by Saunders Lewis	President of Plaid Cymru; 1939–1943	Succeeded by Abi Williams
