= Edward Iwi =

English lawyer and amateur constitutional expert

Edward Frank Iwi (28 November 1904 – 6 June 1966) was an English lawyer who was best known as an amateur constitutional commentator. He notably advocated for the Royal Family to adopt Prince Philip's surname of Mountbatten in lieu of Windsor, in order that any royal children born after Queen Elizabeth II's accession in 1952 would not bear their mother’s pre-marriage surname, which he termed "the Badge of Bastardy".

== Biography ==
Edward Iwi was born on 28 November 1904 to a Jewish family in London and educated at John Bright Grammar School, Llandudno, north Wales. In 1913 his widowed mother married Morris Wartski.

Iwi was admitted as a solicitor in 1927, and served as a Law Society examiner from 1938 to 1962.

He was a frequent writer to the editor of The Times, usually on anomalies in the law that had been overlooked.

In 1937 Iwi called for the creation of a Commonwealth Court, which would replace the judicial functions of the House of Lords and become the court of final appeal in UK cases rather than the Privy Council. During World War II he was calling for each Dominion to create its own Judicial Committee.

In 1938 he was a co-author of The Courts of Justice: Volume 1 of Stephen's Commentaries on the laws of England.

He sent a confidential letter to Herbert Morrison, Home Secretary in Winston Churchill's wartime government, suggesting that the then Princess Elizabeth be made "Duke of Cymru" to create a focus of loyalty for the people of north Wales, who were considered not entirely wedded to the British cause. He also suggested the Princess be appointed Constable of Caernarfon Castle. Iwi pointed to a nationalist movement in north Wales that showed signs of emulating or even joining the Irish republican movement. Indeed, some of the more extreme members were already calling for Wales to be given dominion status. Iwi's suggestions came to nothing.

After World War II, Iwi helped with legal issues surrounding Jewish children who were in the custody of non-Jewish carers, and helped to return these children to the Jewish fold.

In 1947 Iwi chaired a pressure group that collected 50,000 signatures on a petition to be presented to Parliament pleading for women to be able to sit in the House of Lords. This petition was never presented, because in 1949, for the first time, the House of Lords voted in favour of a motion to admit female hereditary peers (although they did not finally gain the right until 1963), but he did participate in another petition that was presented to the House of Lords on 2 March 1948.

In the 1950s he called for Britain to adopt a new approach to the Commonwealth, to abandon her role as matriarch in favour of a sisterly role.

In 1956 he published a selection of essays titled Laws and Flaws: Lapses of the Legislators.

== Royal surname ==
On 9 April 1952, two months after Princess Elizabeth became Queen Elizabeth II, she had declared that the royal family would continue to be known as the "House and Family of Windsor", as it had been under her father King George VI. This declaration was made on the urging of the then prime minister, Winston Churchill, who had long regarded the Duke of Edinburgh's uncle, Lord Mountbatten, as a dangerous and subversive rival who had sacrificed India, and did not want to see that name become the royal family's name.

In 1959 the Queen announced she was pregnant (with Prince Andrew) and was due to give birth in February 1960. This would be the first child born to the Queen since her 1952 declaration. In September 1959 Edward Iwi wrote to the then Prime Minister, Harold Macmillan and to Buckingham Palace, about the name of the Royal Family. Iwi set out his concern as follows:

When the new baby is born, as matters now stand it will bear the Badge of Bastardy namely, its mother's maiden name. As far as I know it will be the first legitimate child to be so born. You will recall that Windsor was the Queen's maiden name and on marriage she took her husband's surname of Mountbatten. Prince Charles and Princess Anne were born with the surname Mountbatten.

There was strong reaction to Iwi's letter. The Lord Chancellor Lord Kilmuir told Macmillan: "This is in very bad taste. Iwi must be silenced... he might go quietly."

Sir George Coldstream, Lord Kilmuir's private secretary, advised 10 Downing Street:

The trouble with Iwi is that he usually puts his finger on an awkward question ... You will no doubt recall that Iwi has on several occasions proved right and on at least one of these occasions he could have caused the government great embarrassment – I refer to the unfortunate mistake by which Princess Arthur of Connaught was named as a Counsellor of State in 1944. Iwi spotted the error but was good enough to keep quiet about it. ... [He should be told] in friendly terms to keep his mouth shut.

Accordingly, Macmillan attempted to rebuff Iwi:

You are quite wrong in stating that Windsor was the surname of Her Majesty before marriage or that Mountbatten was ever the surname of Prince Charles or Princess Anne. Moreover even if you were right about this, I could not think that the surname Windsor could be other than a distinction or that there is anything ignominious in bearing the name of a great house derived through a female ancestor.

But Iwi was not easily put off. He responded to Macmillan on 17 November 1959:

No one is infallible ... If the royal family has never possessed a surname or a family name, then the Proclamation of 1917 substituting Windsor for Guelph would never have been necessary ... The 1952 Amendment changed the children's name from Mountbatten to Windsor and conferring on children as yet unborn what to the man on the Clapham Omnibus is a badge of bastardy, namely the mother's maiden name or family name. ... I have reason to believe that many right thinking people share my view.

(Here he may have had in mind a sermon latterly given by Thomas Bloomer, Bishop of Carlisle which, while not mentioning Iwi by name, seemed to give support to his cause.)

There were further exchanges between Macmillan and Iwi, with no resolution, until January 1960, when the Prime Minister was on an official visit to South Africa. Rab Butler reported to Macmillan that at his first audience with the Queen in his capacity as acting prime minister, she had advised him that she had "absolutely set her heart" on a change to the royal surname. On 8 February, the Queen made a new declaration saying that she had adopted "Mountbatten-Windsor" as the name for all her descendants who did not enjoy the style of Royal Highness. Iwi was vindicated. Prince Andrew was born 11 days later, on 19 February 1960.

On 18 March, The Law Journal contained an article by Iwi entitled "Mountbatten-Windsor", explaining something of the history of the royal family's surname and why it had been appropriate for the Queen to have made the declaration she had latterly made.

== Private life ==
In 1929 Iwi was engaged to Esther Sacker. Esther Iwi was appointed a Justice of the Peace in 1949. In 1951 she resigned as a magistrate at her own request, and became involved in a dispute with the Lord Chancellor, which reached Parliament.

In 1955 he retired as a Member of the Council of the Anglo-Jewish Association. He was again elected, and retired in 1962.

Edward Iwi died in an accident in Venice, Italy on 6 June 1966, aged 61.

== See also ==
- History of Plaid Cymru
