= D. J. Williams (Welsh nationalist) =

Welsh nationalist and writer (1885–1970)

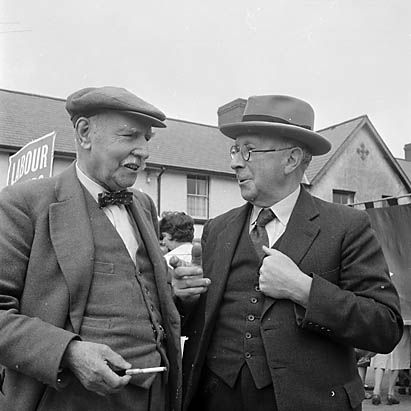
DJ Williams (right) with the poet and preacher T. E. Nicholas (Niclas y Glais) at a CND rally at Aberystwyth in 1961. Photograph by Geoff Charles.

David John Williams (26 June 1885 – 4 January 1970) was one of the foremost Welsh-language writers of the twentieth century and a prominent Welsh nationalist.

== Life ==
Williams was born at Pen-rhiw, a farmhouse near Llansawel, Carmarthenshire, moving with his family to a smaller farm, Abernant, near Rhydcymerau in 1891. He left home in 1902 and spent four years working in the south Wales coalfield. He resumed his studies, eventually studying English at the University College of Wales, Aberystwyth and Jesus College, Oxford. At Oxford he became friends with Flora Forster, who declined his offers of marriage. For most of his life he taught English at the grammar school in Fishguard (now Ysgol Bro Gwaun), Pembrokeshire.

He died in 1970 in Rhydcymerau.

== Politics ==
A socialist, he was one of the founders of Plaid Cymru, the Welsh National Party, in 1925. He took part, with Saunders Lewis and Lewis Valentine, in the symbolic burning of a bombing school in Penyberth in north-west Wales in 1936, for which he served nine months in Wormwood Scrubs prison.

== Literary career ==
Williams was a short story writer of renown and also the author of two volumes of autobiography. All his work is inspired by his vision of his native locality, of a close-knit community where common values give worth to all. Hen Dŷ Ffarm ("The old farmhouse") was translated into English by poet Waldo Williams in 1953 as part of a UNESCO programme to promote minority languages to wider audiences.

He held the Irish journalist and poet George William Russell, who wrote with the pseudonym Æ, in high regard, publishing a pamphlet A.E. a Chymru ('A.E. and Wales') in 1929 and a translation of Æ's The National Being under the title Y Bod Cenhedlig in 1963.

== Works ==
- A.E. a Chymru (1929), concerning the Irish writer George William Russell
- Hen wynebau ("Old faces"), 1934. A portrait of his native locality.
- Storïau'r tir ("Stories of the land"), 1936, 1941, 1949. A series of three volumes of short stories.
- Hen dŷ ffarm ("The old farmhouse"), 1953. Autobiography.
- Mazzini (1954), concerning the Italian politician Giuseppe Mazzini
- Yn chwech ar hugain oed ("When I was twenty-six years old"). 1959. Autobiography.
- Y Bod Cenhedlig (1963), translation of The National Being by George William Russell
- Y Gaseg Ddu ("The black mare"), 1970. Short stories.

== Sources ==
- Jenkins, Dafydd (1973), D. J. Williams. Writers of Wales series. Cardiff : University of Wales Press. An English introduction to his life and work.
- 'Williams, David John (1885–1970)'. In Meic Stephens (Ed.) (1998), The new companion to the literature of Wales. Cardiff : University of Wales Press. ISBN 0-7083-1383-3.
- http://www.cofiantdj.net/cyhoeddiadau-d-j.html
