= Conscientious objectors in Wales =

A Conscientious Objector is an "individual who has refused to take part in the Great War". There were different meanings for this, for example, religious meanings (not believing in violence and/or killing), freedom of thought, conscience, and disability. In many countries Conscientious Objectors are forced to do other services as a substitute for military service. Conscientious Objectors were often seen as cowards. Many people from across the United Kingdom were considered to be Conscientious Objectors during the First World War, and the movement was as pronounced in Wales as in any other part of the county.

In Wales there was strong support for the movement from pacifists within the large non-conformist community.

== George Maitland Lloyd Davies ==
One of the most vocal opponents of conscription for the Great War was George Maitland Lloyd Davies (30 April 1880 – 16 December 1949), was born in Liverpool. He was imprisoned for opposing the Great War and conscription. He and his friend, Richard Roberts from Blaenau Ffestiniog, formed a Christian society to promote peace during World War I called the "Fellowship of Reconciliation" (Cymdeithas y Cymod). They published a magazine under the title "Y Deyrnas" from 1916 to 1919, with Thomas Rees, head of Bala-Bangor college as editor.

In 1937, the Welsh National Pacifist Society was established with George Maitland Lloyd Davies (G.M.LL.D) as president. At the end of 1937 a pamphlet had been published to go along with the launch of the society by the name of "Ymorthodwn a Rhyfel" (We Reject War).
