= Abi Williams =

Welsh nationalist (died 1963)

Abi Williams (died 1963) was a Welsh nationalist who briefly served as the President of Plaid Cymru.

A member of the Independent Labour Party, Williams was known for his oratory. In 1936, he left the ILP and joined Plaid Cymru, and as a result was victimised and dismissed from his job, surveying roads in Flintshire; he eventually received compensation for the dismissal.

Despite not being a prominent figure in Plaid, he was elected president in 1943. He was also selected as the party's prospective candidate for Merioneth. However, he was unable to fulfil either responsibility, as he suffered with what was described as a "nervous condition", and the leadership of the party was in practice covered by his vice president, Gwynfor Evans.

Evans replaced Williams as the candidate for Merioneth in the 1945 general election, and replaced him as party President later in the year.

Williams died early in 1963.

Party political offices
Preceded by John Edward Daniel	President of Plaid Cymru; 1943–1945	Succeeded by Gwynfor Evans
