= RAF Penrhos =

Former Royal Air Force station in Gwynedd, Wales

RAF Penrhos
- Penrhos, Llanbedrog, Gwynedd in Wales

Site information
- Type: Royal Air Force station Observers Advanced Flying Unit
- Owner: Air Ministry
- Operator: Royal Air Force
- Controlled by: RAF Flying Training Command

Location
- Shown within Gwynedd RAF Penrhos (the United Kingdom)
- Coordinates: 52°52′26″N 004°28′26″W

Site history
- Built: 1936
- In use: 1937–1946
- Battles/wars: European theatre of World War II

Garrison information
- Occupants: 1944; Officers – 117 (11 WAAF); Other Ranks – 1,134 (245 WAAF)

Airfield information
- Elevation: 16 metres (52 ft) AMSL
Runways
| Direction | Length and surface |
|---|---|
| NE/SW | 860 yards (786 m) Grass strip |
| NW/SE | 700 yards (640 m) Grass strip |
| E/S | 700 yards (640 m) Grass strip |

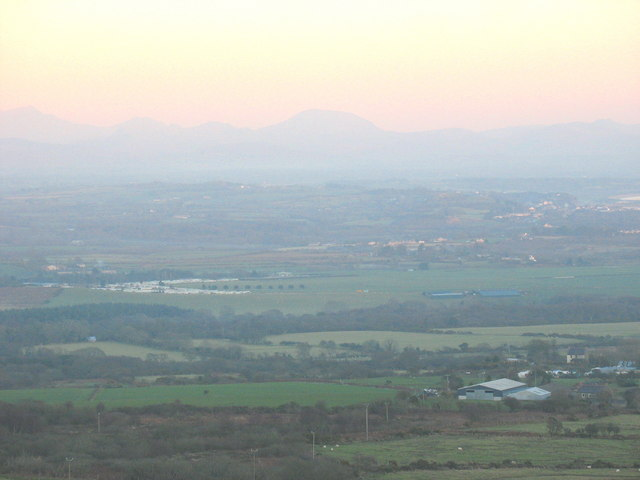
The former RAF Penrhos viewed from Foel Fras, Mynytho. The airfield site is the large flat area behind the trees. The northern part of the site is occupied by a caravan park

Royal Air Force Penrhos, or more simply RAF Penrhos, is a former Royal Air Force airfield near Penrhos in the community of Llanbedrog, 14.7 miles (23.7 km) west of Porthmadog in Gwynedd, Wales.

It was operational from 1 February 1937 to 21 October 1946 for armament training, air observer, bombing and gunnery schools.

== History ==
In 1936 a decision was taken to establish an RAF bombing school at Penyberth, a farm of about 250 acres (101 ha) for RAF Penrhos which was purchased by the Air Ministry, including the area of the low plateau in the bend of the river where the Afon Penrhos joins the Afon Geirch. Opposition was strongly felt, particularly as it was perceived that the sixteenth century house, Penyberth was, in Saunders Lewis' words, 'one of the essential homes of Welsh culture, idiom and literature'. As work proceeded, an arson attack was carried out on 8 September 1936 after which the arsonists gave themselves up at Pwllheli police station. Despite this the base came into operation in February 1937. In December 1940 a detachment from No. 312 (Czechoslovak) Squadron was moved to protect Penrhos from German attack.

The site of the former RAF base was used to house a nursing home for elderly Poles called "Polish Village". By 2025, it was demolished and redeveloped.

== Units ==
During the course of the operation of the station, the following units were at sometime based at RAF Penrhos:

- 'C' Flight of No. 1 Anti-Aircraft Co-operation Unit RAF (1 AACU)
- 'J' Flight of No. 1 Anti-Aircraft Co-operation Unit RAF (1 AACU)
- No. 1 Air Observers School RAF
- No. 2 Air Crew Holding Unit RAF
- No. 2 Service Flying Training School RAF.
- No. 5 Armament Training Camp RAF with Westland Wallaces
- No. 5 Armament Training Station RAF
- No. 5 Flying Training School RAF
- No. 5 Service Flying Training School RAF
- No. 6 Flying Training School RAF
- No. 6 Service Flying Training School RAF
- No. 9 Air Observers School RAF with Handley Page Harrows and Fairey Battles the unit was renamed No. 9 Bombing & Gunnery School two months later
- No. 9 (Observers) Advanced Flying Unit RAF
- No. 9 Service Flying Training School RAF
- No. 10 Flying Training School RAF
- No. 10 Service Flying Training School RAF
- No. 11 Service Flying Training School RAF
- No. 12 Flying Training School RAF
- No. 12 Operational Training Unit RAF
- No. 12 Service Flying Training School RAF
- No. 63 Squadron RAF
- No. 258 Squadron RAF
- A detachment of No. 312 (Czechoslovak) Squadron RAF with Hawker Hurricanes until April 1941
- No. 2780 Squadron RAF Regiment
- Signals Instructor School RAF

During the late 1980s privately owned aircraft used to land here during the summer on a 400-yard tarmac strip.

== Current use ==
Part of the site is now Pen-y-berth caravan park.
