= Penyberth =

Farmhouse in Penrhos, Gwynedd, Wales

Coordinates: 52.8792°N 4.4774°W

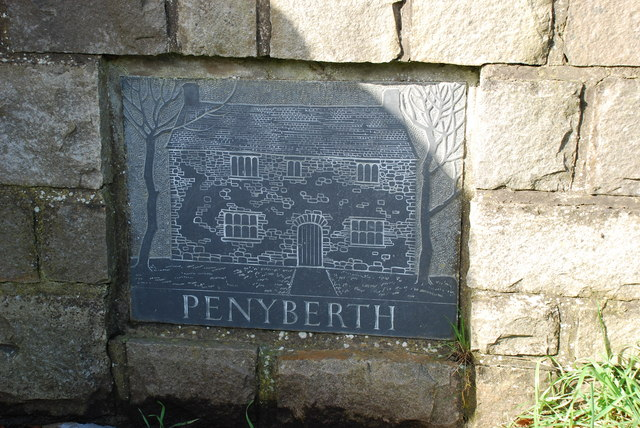
Memorial at Penyberth

Penyberth (Welsh pronunciation: [pɛnəˈbɛrθ]) was a farmhouse at Penrhos, on the Llŷn Peninsula near Pwllheli, Gwynedd, which had been the home to generations of patrons of poets, and also a way-station for pilgrims to Bardsey Island, but destroyed in 1936 in order to build a training camp and aerodrome for the RAF.

== History ==
=== Background ===
"Tân yn Llŷn" track by Plethyn

In 1936, the government's Air Ministry announced its plans to establish RAF Penrhos, an airfield which would also function as an air observer, gunnery and bombing school at Penyberth on the Llŷn peninsula in Gwynedd. This led to widespread nationalist protests in Wales, known as Tân yn Llŷn (Fire in Llŷn), helped define Plaid Genedlaethol Cymru (National Party of Wales). The government settled on Llŷn as the site for the airfield after similar locations in Northumberland and Dorset were met with protests.

However, Prime Minister Stanley Baldwin refused to hear the case against the airfield in Penrhos, despite a deputation representing half a million Welsh protesters. The Welsh writer and nationalist Saunders Lewis summed up public opinion in Wales when he claimed that the government was intent upon turning one of the "essential homes of Welsh culture, idiom, and literature" into a place for promoting what Lewis viewed as a barbaric method of warfare.

=== Fire and sentencing ===
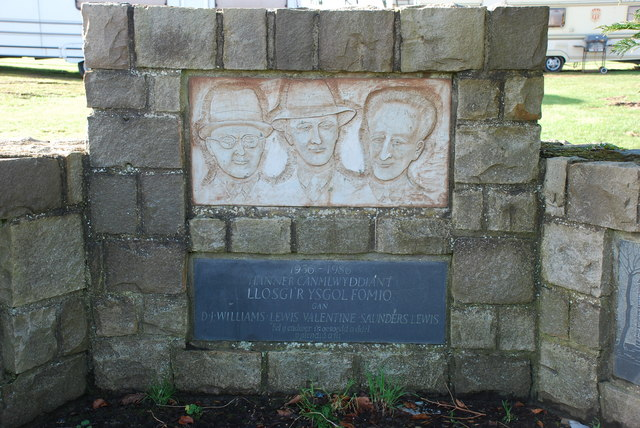
Llosgi'r Ysgol Fomio - The Burning of the Bombing School memorial

On 8 September 1936, three Plaid Cymru members, Saunders Lewis, the poet and preacher Lewis Valentine and the novelist David John Williams, committed an arson attack against RAF Penrhos and then went to give themselves up at Pwllheli police station, in accordance with Gandhian principles. Legend has it that they then spent the evening discussing poetry with the duty sergeant. The trial at Caernarfon failed to agree on a verdict and the case was sent to the Old Bailey in London. The "Three" were sentenced to nine months imprisonment in Wormwood Scrubs, and on their release they were greeted as heroes by a crowd of 15,000 people at a pavilion in Caernarfon.

=== Public response ===
Many Welsh people were angered by the judge's scornful treatment of the Welsh language, by the decision to move the trial to London, and by the decision of University College, Swansea, to dismiss Lewis from his post before he had been found guilty. Dafydd Glyn Jones wrote of the fire that it was "the first time in five centuries that Wales struck back at England with a measure of violence... To the Welsh people, who had long ceased to believe that they had it in them, it was a profound shock."

=== Symbolism ===
"Tân yn Llŷn" track by various artists

This incident is known in the Welsh language as Llosgi'r ysgol fomio (The bombing school burning) or Tân yn Llŷn (Fire in Llŷn), and has attained iconic status in Welsh nationalist circles.

=== Current use ===
Penyberth was the site of the Wakestock contemporary music festival from 2000 to 2014.

== See also ==
- RAF Penrhos
