= Usk Bridge =

Usk Bridge may be used as the name for any bridge crossing the River Usk in Wales, UK.

Specific notable examples include:

- Usk Bridge (Brecon), the main bridge in Brecon, Powys
- Usk Bridge (Usk), the main road bridge in Usk, Monmouthshire
- Great Western Railway Usk bridge, the main railway bridge in Newport city centre
- M4 motorway Usk bridge, the motorway crossing near the city of Newport

== See also ==
- List of bridges in Wales
