= Albany Gallery =

Coordinates: 51°29′37.32″N 3°10′0.14″W

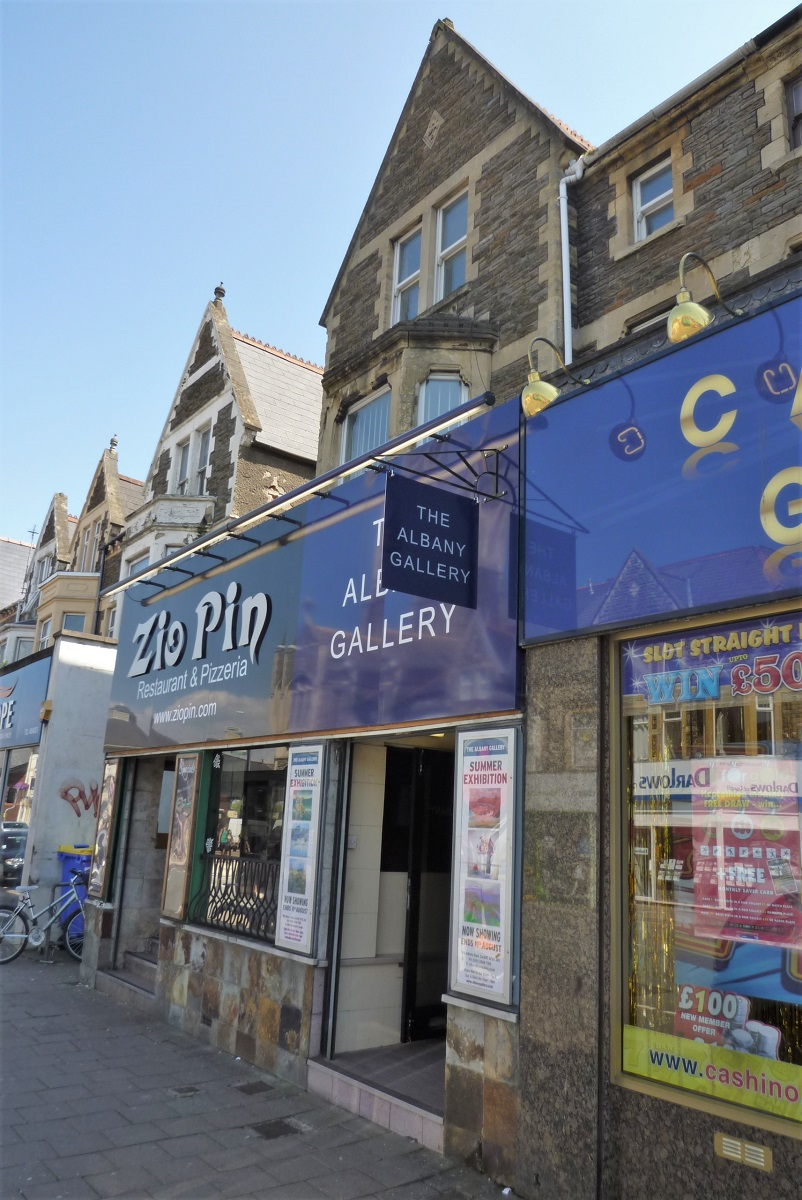
Albany Gallery on Albany Road

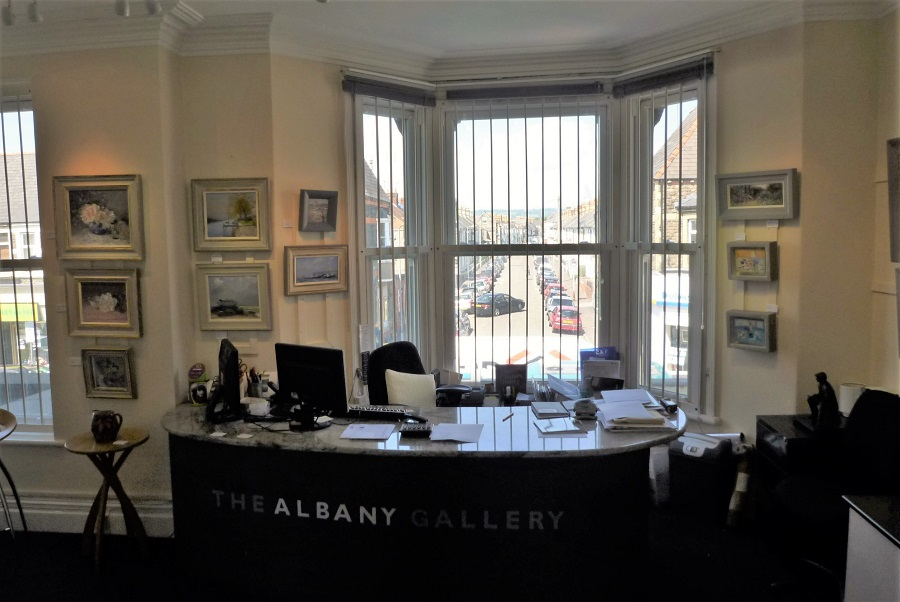
Albany Gallery reception

The Albany Gallery is a commercial art gallery in Roath, Cardiff, Wales. It was established in 1965 by Mary Yapp and painter, David Griffiths.

== Background ==
The Albany Gallery was created by former farmer Mary Yapp and artist David Griffiths, whom Yapp had met in Pwllheli where Griffiths held an annual summer exhibition. Griffiths expressed an interest in opening a gallery in Cardiff and they found suitable premises on Albany Road, Roath. Originally called the David Griffiths Gallery, it was eventually renamed the Albany Gallery in 1967. Griffiths left after 6 months to concentrate on his painting. Yapp ran the gallery for 25 years with a friend, Joan Hughes, then after that ran the gallery by herself. Yapp's three children later became partners in the business. Yapp retired from the business in 2019 aged 91 (and died in 2024).

The gallery celebrated its 60th anniversary in 2025, opening a special exhibition on 24 October with a talk by television presenter, Arfon Haines Davies.

== Exhibitions ==
The gallery's first exhibition in 1965 was of Caernarfon painter, Charles Wyatt Warren, which sold out within two days and was covered in the Western Mail newspaper.

Yapp became the agent for Kyffin Williams. A Kyffin Williams exhibition at the Albany Gallery in October 2004 saw people sleeping overnight outside the gallery, in the hope of buying one of his works.

Yapp championed Pontardawe artist, Mike Jones, who held regular solo exhibitions at the Albany Gallery.

The gallery takes part in the Roath Gallery Weekend, which first took place in May 2024.
