= Little Kix =

Studio album by Mansun
- Released: 14 August 2000
- Recorded: 2000
- Studio: Astoria on the River Thames
- Genre: Synth pop; indie rock
- Length: 52:14
- Label: Parlophone
- Producer: Hugh Padgham, Michael Hunter

Mansun chronology
Six (1999)	Little Kix (2000)	Kleptomania (2004)

Singles from Little Kix
- 1. "I Can Only Disappoint U" Released: 31 July 2000; 2. "Electric Man" Released: 6 November 2000; 3. "Fool" Released: 29 January 2001

Little Kix is the third album by English alternative rock band Mansun, released on 14 August 2000 and was the band's last studio album to be completed and released before their dissolution in 2003. It was promoted by three singles, and peaked at #12 on the UK Albums Chart.

== Overview ==
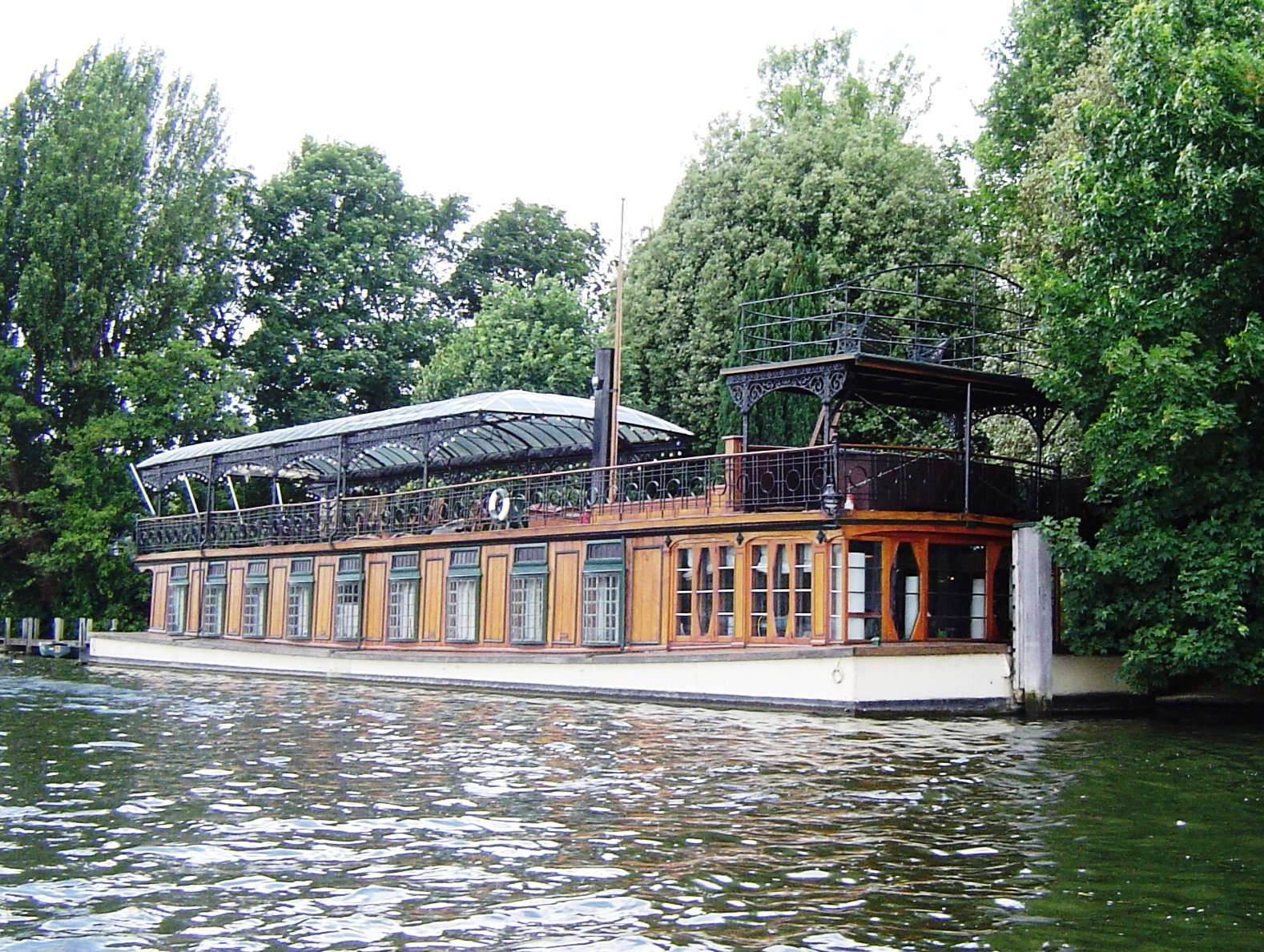
Little Kix was recorded on the Astoria.

The album was recorded aboard the Astoria, a boat that housed a recording studio owned by David Gilmour of Pink Floyd, and marked a departure from the band's previous way recording in that bandleader Draper had been removed from his position of producer by the record company and was replaced by Hugh Padgham, formerly a producer for Phil Collins, XTC and the Police, to ensure more "independent local radio friendly" sound. Draper also stated that the working method was greatly different from his work on the former two albums: "Little Kix was the only album I had to make demos for, the rest I just made up as I went along".

Record label interference extended further than the choice of producer, with Parlophone imposing several limitations that Draper felt restricted their creativity: "[W]e were battered into being a pop group with 'Little Kix'... We were told absolutely definitively 'You are not allowed to have any prog rock elements in the album', so that's why the album fades in and it's one second longer than Dark Side of the Moon, just to piss the record company off (laughs)". In the liner notes of Legacy: The Best of Mansun Draper provided an example of the dysfunction that existed between the band and its label that centred on the track "Fool". After reading a book on song writing by Jimmy Webb he claimed it "inspired me to write an ironic song that is now my least favourite Mansun track. Bowie intro, comical chorus lyrics and guess what? The label wanted it as a fucking single! I couldn’t believe it".

Draper credits the album's gestation process as part of what ultimately led to the end of the band: "What's left is an odd story, people have spoken to me about writing books about it, I don't think I'll ever go on the record and tell the true story, there are one or two people that know. At the end of the day people always say bands split over musical differences but they never do. It's all to do with money and drugs and all sorts of shit."

== Release ==
Little Kix was released in August 2000. Early album titles include Magnetic Poetry and The Trouble with Relationships. Little Kix did not match the popularity of the group's previous albums and reflected a continuing decline in commercial fortunes for the group. It peaked at #12 on the UK Albums Chart and was certified Silver by the BPI.

Three singles were released from the album. The first, "I Can Only Disappoint U" became one of the group's most successful singles peaking at #8 on the UK Singles Chart in the run up to the album's release. "Electric Man", the second single was released in November and peaked at #23. The final single "Fool" charted at #28.

== Reception ==
Professional ratings
Review scores
Source	Rating
AllMusic	2.5/5 stars
The Guardian	3/5 stars
Leonard's Lair	4/5
Melody Maker	4/5 stars
NME	3/10
Pitchfork	6.8/10
Q	2/5 stars
Select	2/5
The Times	6/10
Uncut	4/5 stars

Dean Carlson of AllMusic observed in a negative review, "a new, lovelorn Mansun is shown stripped of their highly divisive costuming of old – and their bare bodies are ugly. It's this album's simpler approach that shows them naked and floppy without their previous new romantic/prog-rock garments to hide their failings."

NME critic Steven Wells gave a scathing review, saying, "If Attack of the Grey Lantern was a trip and Six was a panic attack, then Little Kix is cold turkey. Mature, mainstream and utterly predictable, the band that once promised us the world have delivered yet more lame, cripplingly self-referential, puffed-up, headache-inducing, late-Manics-style retro indie-pomp. From vital to utterly redundant in just three albums. What an horrendous cockup."

Leonard's Lair gave a positive review of the album, saying that it was "a return to former glories" as they felt Six was "a prog-rock album which even early Genesis fans might have called self indulgent." They felt that the album "doesn't contain anything as fantastic as 'Legacy' or 'Stripper Vicar' but certainly has its fair share of great moments", and concluded, "Mansun sometimes fly a little too high with ideas above their station but more often than not they deserve to get away with it thanks to superb musicianship and sheer spirit."

Pitchfork's Craig Griffith observed the departure of glam rock and progressive influence that featured on their previous albums, saying, "This is almost shifting onto another plane of music. But that's not to say the shift is dramatic enough for comparisons to become meaningless. The band has expressed a taste for the Bee Gees, ABBA, and mid-'80s Prince, and this record is probably the result of such affinities." However, he was critical of the lyrics, saying, "The album's largest detractor lies with its lyrics. The complete lack of irony prevents it from reaching its potential as a genuinely satisfying production ... Everything is so amazingly darling and clichéd."

== Track listing ==
All tracks are written by Paul Draper; except as indicated.

No.	Title	Writer(s)	Length
1.	"Butterfly (A New Beginning)"	Draper, Dominic Chad	5:52
2.	"I Can Only Disappoint U"	Draper, Chad	4:47
3.	"Comes as No Surprise"		4:01
4.	"Electric Man"		5:21
5.	"Love Is..."		4:37
6.	"Soundtrack 4 2 Lovers"	Draper, Chad	4:11
7.	"Forgive Me"		4:44
8.	"Until the Next Life"		4:49
9.	"Fool"		4:17
10.	"We Are the Boys"		4:25
11.	"Goodbye"		5:10
Total length:			52:14

== Personnel ==
Mansun

- Paul Draper – lead vocals, acoustic guitar, keyboards
- Dominic Chad – electric guitar, backing vocals, piano
- Stove King – bass
- Andie Rathbone – drums, percussion

Production

- Hugh Padgham – producer
- Mike Hunter – co-producer, hammond organ, Pro Tools
- Mark 'Spike' Stent – mixing
- Anne Dudley – strings on "Electric Man" and "Soundtrack 4 2 Lovers"
- Anton Corbijn – photography
- Pennie Smith – live photography

== B-sides ==
from "I Can Only Disappoint U"

- "Decisions, Decisions"
- "Repair Man"
- "My Idea of Fun"
- "Golden Stone"

from "Electric Man"

- "The Drifters"
- "The Apartment"
- "I Can Only Disappoint U (Perfecto club mix)"
- "Electric Man (Acoustic version)"
- "I Can Only Disappoint U (Instrumental mix)"

from "Fool"

- "I've Seen the Top of the Mountain"
- "Promises"
- "Fade in Time"
- "Black Infinite Space"

== Charts ==
Chart (2000)	Peak position
Japanese Oricon Album Chart	47
Scottish Albums Chart	13
UK Album Chart	12
