= Newbridge, Monmouthshire =

Newbridge, Monmouthshire may refer to:

- Newbridge, Caerphilly
- Newbridge-on-Usk
