= Six (song) =

"Six (Eleven EP)"

Single by Mansun

from the album Six
- Released: 1 February 1999
- Recorded: 1998
- Genre: Progressive rock, alternative rock, experimental rock
- Length: 8:08; 3:59 (Single Version/Baker Mix)
- Label: Parlophone
- Songwriter(s): Paul Draper
- Producer(s): Paul Draper, Mark 'Spike' Stent; Arthur Baker (Single Version)

Mansun singles chronology
"Negative" (1998)	"Six (Eleven EP)" (1999)	"I Can Only Disappoint U" (2000)

"Six" is a song by the English alternative rock band Mansun. The song was written by band-leader Paul Draper. It was recorded and produced by Paul Draper and Mark 'Spike' Stent with additional production by Mike Hunter during sessions for the group's second studio album.

The song was re-recorded with New York producer Arthur Baker in a simpler arrangement produced and mixed by Baker and released as the fourth and final single in early 1999 from the group's second album, Six. The Baker version charted better than its predecessor in the typically quiet post-Christmas singles market returning the group to the top twenty in the UK peaking at #16. The single version of "Six" has none of the experimental rock sound that is representative of the parent album as a whole. In the US, Baker's single version appears in place of the album version on Epic Records' truncated version of Six.

The music video for "Six" was directed by Grant Gee.

== Track listing ==
All songs written and composed by Paul Draper and Dominic Chad; except where indicated.

UK Limited edition clear 7" vinyl
No.	Title	Writer(s)	Length
1.	"Six (Single Version)"	Paul Draper	3:59
2.	"Live Television" (recorded live at Brixton Academy)		7:19

UK CD one
No.	Title	Writer(s)	Length
1.	"Six (Single Version)"	Paul Draper	3:59
2.	"Church of the Drive Thru Elvis"		3:01
3.	"But the Trains Run On Time"		3:37

UK CD two (Includes a free poster)
No.	Title	Writer(s)	Length
1.	"Six"	Paul Draper	8:08
2.	"What It's Like to Be Hated"		3:24
3.	"Being a Girl (Parts One and Two) (Live)" (recorded live at Brixton Academy)		4:52

== Personnel ==
Mansun

- Dominic Chad – lead guitar, backing vocals
- Paul Draper – lead vocals, rhythm guitar
- Andie Rathbone – drums
- Stove – bass

Production

- Paul Draper and Mark 'Spike' Stent – producer ("Six" (Album version))
- Arthur Baker – producer, mixing ("Six" (Single version))
- Mike Hunter – engineer ("Church of the Drive Thru Elvis", "But the Trains Run On Time")
- Ian Grimble – engineer ("What It's Like to Be Hated"), mixing (all tracks except "Six" (both versions))
- Yosuke Komatsu – photography

== Chart positions ==
Chart (1999)	Peak position
UK Singles Chart	16
Scottish Singles Chart	21
