= Dominic Chad =

English musician (born 1972)

- Born: Dominic Chad; 5 June 1972 (age 54); Exeter, Devon, England
- Genres: Alternative rock
- Occupations: Musician, songwriter
- Instruments: Guitar, vocals, keyboards, piano, synthesizers, bass
- Years active: 1991–present

Dominic Chad (born 5 June 1972 in Exeter, Devon) is an English musician, formerly the lead guitarist, backing vocalist, arranger and co-writer of the alternative rock band Mansun.

== Biography ==
=== Early days ===
Born in Exeter, Devon, Chad grew up in Maidstone, Kent where he attended Maidstone Grammar School. Dominic went on to study French and Russian at Bangor University, where he met bassist Mark Howard. They formed the band "Floating Bear" in 1991 with Lance Paine, Pete James and Iain Jenner and released a five-track cassette entitled "Barely Real". The band regularly played at the university's student bar including an Amnesty benefit gig, and also played at Pontardawe Festival.

=== Mansun ===
After being kicked off his degree at the end of the second year, Chad re-located to Chester where he worked as a barman at the Fat Cat Cafe Bar on Watergate Street and met Stove King and Paul Draper, with whom he formed Mansun. Whilst in Mansun, Chad worked as an arranger and songwriter, and co-wrote several of Mansun's songs with Draper as well as writing and performing a number of B-sides himself. He also took lead vocals on some of Mansun's songs, such as "Golden Stone", a B-side to "I Can Only Disappoint U" and a live cover of the Magazine single "Shot by Both Sides".

After nearly eight years together, Mansun broke up in 2003 whilst working on their fourth studio album.

=== Post-Mansun career ===
Chad has since gone on to work as a support worker, supporting people with learning difficulties, physical disabilities and brain injuries. From 2005 to 2010, he worked as an ambulance medic in the London Ambulance Service. Chad studied at the Oxford School of Sports Massage completing their Level 5 BTEC diploma, and also works as a therapist. He also volunteers as a RNLI Lifeboat Crew member in his spare time and in 2016 participated in Team Trailtriker, "4 women and 4 men from the UK aiming to raise as much money for Oxfam whilst raising awareness of those battling cancer and widening awareness of a rare illness called POEMS Syndrome".

Chad also composed and performed the music for the short film The Man on the Moor, directed by his friend Steven Rosam. He has also written and co-written episodes for Wussywat The Clumsy Cat, a children's TV show screened on CBeebies from June 2015.

As of 2019, Chad is working as an area manager with people who have learning difficulties.

== List of Mansun songs composed by Dominic Chad ==
Composed alone

Year	Title	Release
1998	"Face in the Crowd"	"Legacy" (single)
1998	"Inverse Midas"	Six
1998	"Witness to a Murder (Part Two)"	Six
2000	"Golden Stone"	"I Can Only Disappoint U" (single)
2003	"Slipping Away" (Instrumental Coda)	Kleptomania

Composed with Paul Draper (and others)

Year	Title	Release	Notes
1997	"The Holy Blood and the Holy Grail"	"She Makes My Nose Bleed" (single)	
1997	"The Impending Collapse of it All"	"Taxloss" (single)	
1997	"K.I.Double.S.I.N.G"	"Closed for Business" (single)	with Paul Draper and Stove King
1997	"Everyone Must Win"	"Closed for Business" (single)	with Howard Devoto and Paul Draper
1998	"Can't Afford to Die"	"Legacy" (single)	
1998	"Spasm of Identity"	"Legacy" (single)	
1998	"Check Under the Bed"	"Legacy" (single)	
1998	"GSOH"	"Legacy" (single)	
1998	"Hideout"	"Being a Girl (Part One)" (single)	with Paul Draper and Stove King
1998	"Been Here Before"	"Being a Girl (Part One)" (single)	
1998	"Negative"	Six	with Paul Draper, Stove King and Andie Rathbone
1998	"Shotgun"	Six	
1998	"Television"	Six	
1998	"When the Wind Blows"	"Negative" (single)	
1998	"King of Beauty"	"Negative" (single)	
1998	"I Deserve What I Get"	"Negative" (single)	
1999	"Church of the Drive Thru Elvis"	"Six" (single)	
1999	"But the Trains Run on Time"	"Six" (single)	
1999	"What It's Like to Be Hated"	"Six" (single)	
2000	"Butterfly (A New Beginning)"	Little Kix	
2000	"I Can Only Disappoint U"	Little Kix	
2000	"Soundtrack 4 2 Lovers"	Little Kix	
2000	"Decisions, Decisions"	"I Can Only Disappoint U" (single)	
2000	"Repair Man"	"I Can Only Disappoint U" (single)	
2000	"My Idea of Fun"	"I Can Only Disappoint U" (single)	
2000	"The Apartment"	"Electric Man" (single)	
2001	"Black Infinite Space	"Fool" (single)	
