= D. Gwenallt Jones =

Welsh poet, critic, and scholar (1899–1968)

David James Jones (18 May 1899 – 24 December 1968), commonly known by his bardic name Gwenallt, was a Welsh poet, critic, and scholar, and one of the most important figures of 20th-century Welsh-language literature. He created his bardic name by transposing Alltwen, the name of the village across the river from his birthplace.

== Early life ==
Jones was born in Pontardawe, Glamorganshire, the eldest son of Thomas "Ehedydd" ('lark') Jones and his wife Mary, who left Rhydcymerau, Carmarthenshire for his father to obtain work. He was conscripted into the Army in 1917 during World War I. But he declared himself a conscientious objector. Consequently he was imprisoned, initially in Wormwood Scrubs and then in Princetown Work Centre in the former Dartmoor Prison until 1919, which he wrote about in his 1934 novel Plasau'r Brenin('The King's Mansions'). In 1919 he enrolled at University College Wales, Aberystwyth, where he met the writer Idwal Jones, whose biography he had published in 1958.

Jones' father was killed by molten metal in Pontardawe Tinplate Works, which had a deep effect on him. His childhood was spent in an industrial area. However in his youth he often stayed with his relatives in Rhydcymerau, which had a deep influence on him.

== Later life and career ==
In 1926 the poem, Y Mynach, won Jones the Chair at the National Eisteddfod of Wales which was held in Swansea. Five years later he won the Chair for a second time at Bangor for his Breuddwyd y Bardd ('The Poet's Dream'). He was a founder member of the Welsh Academy (Academi Gymraeg). And he was the first editor of the literary magazine Taliesin, which he edited from 1961 to 1965. On graduating from Aberystwyth with a BA in Welsh and English, he became a teacher of Welsh in the grammar school of Barry, Glamorgan. Later, in 1927, he was appointed as a lecturer in the Welsh language department of the University College of Wales, Aberystwyth, the former name of Aberystwyth University He applied for the post of professor of the department upon the retirement of T. H. Parry-Williams. However, he was overlooked in favour of a much younger applicant, for which he never forgave the College.

Jones graduated as MA in 1929 and was awarded an honorary D.Litt. degree by the University of Wales in 1967.

Jones regularly attended chapel in his youth. But he later embraced Marxism. Subsequently he became a Welsh nationalist and a Christian poet. He was an early member of Plaid Cymru. Christian themes are present in much of his work, not least in Y Coed, which was published following his visit to the Holy Land.

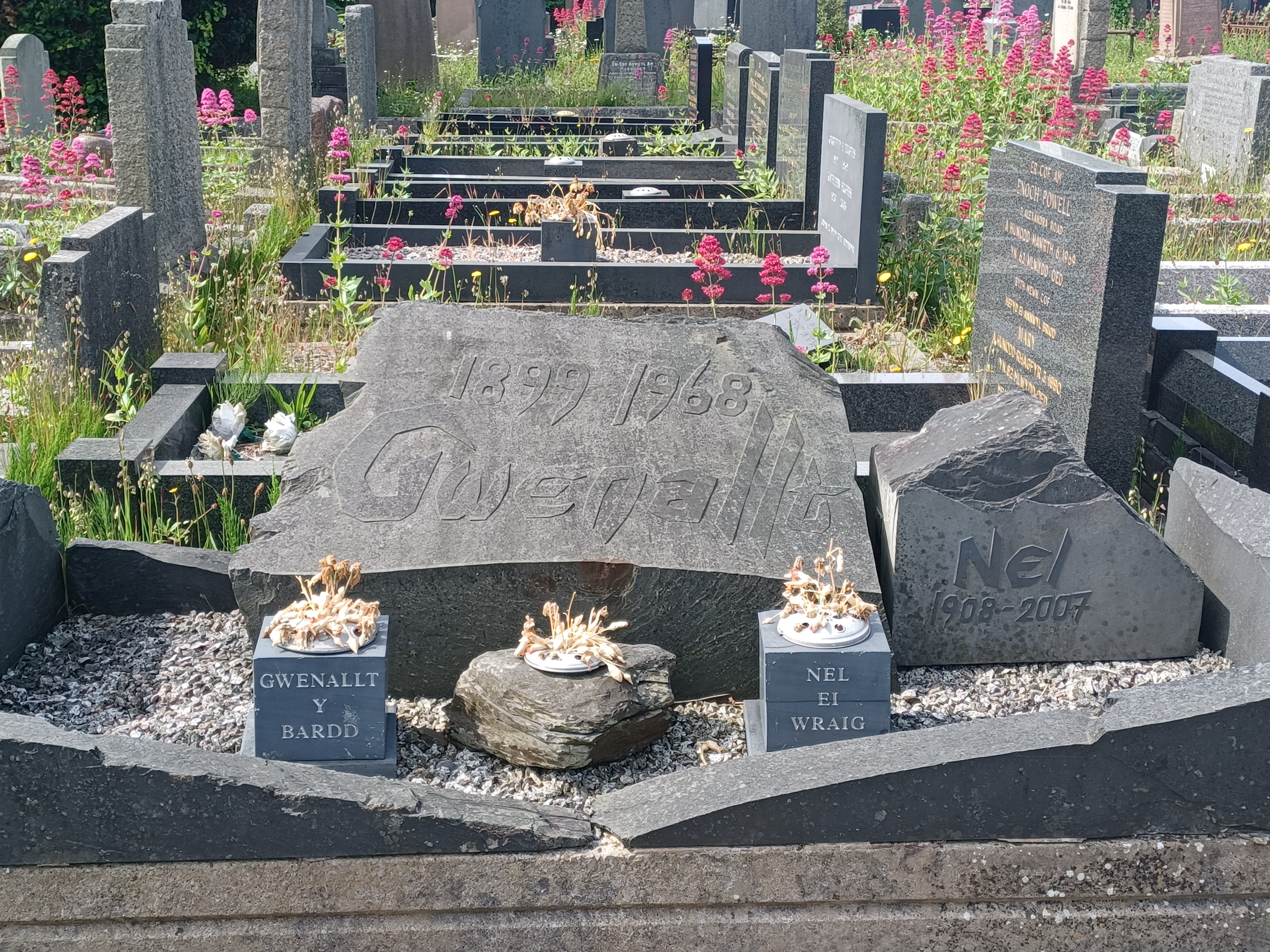
Gwenallt's grave in Plascrug Cemetery, Aberystwyth

Jones is buried in Plascug Cemetery, Aberystwyth. In 1997 a memorial plaque was placed on his house, Rhydymôr, Ffordd Rheidol, Penparcau, a village near Aberystwyth.

== Works ==
=== Novels ===
- Jones, D.G. (1934). Plasau'r Brenin. Llandysul: Gwasg Gomer.
- Gwenallt (1982). Ffwrneisiau. Llandysul, Dyfed: Gomer Press. ISBN 0850885884.

=== Other ===
- 1934. Yr Areithiau Pros. Collected and edited by D. Gwenallt Jones. Caerdydd : Gwasg Prifysgol Cymru.
- 1936. Blodeugerdd o'r Ddeunawfed Ganrif. Collected and edited by D. Gwenallt Jones. Caerdydd : Gwasg Prifysgol Cymru.
- 1936. Detholiad o Ryddiaith Gymraeg R. J. Derfel. D. Gwenallt Jones. Caerdydd : Gwasg Prifysgol Cymru.
- 1948. Bywyd a Gwaith Islwyn. D. Gwenallt Jones. Lerpwl : Gwasg y Brython.
- 1958. Cofiant Idwal Jones, Llanbedr-Pont-Steffan. D. Gwenallt Jones. Aberystwyth : Gwasg Aberystwyth.
- 2001. Cerddi Gwenallt: Y Casgliad. Collected Poems. Edited by Christine James. Llandysul : Gomer.

== Critical studies ==
- Allchin, Donald and D. Densil Morgan. 2000. Sensuous Glory The Poetic Vision of D. Gwenallt Jones. Norwich: Canterbury Press.
- Edwards, Hywel Teifi. 2006. Making the most of Gwenallt. Cambria. 3. 49.
- Hodges, H.A. 1975. Gwenallt: an English view of the poet. Planet. 29. 24-29.
- Johnston, Dafydd. 1994. A guide to the literature of Wales. Cardiff: University of Wales Press. Pages 99–101.
- Jones, Gwyn and John Rowlands. 1980. Profiles: A Guide to Writing in Twentieth Century Wales. Llandysul: Gomer. Pages 70–75.
- Stephens, Meic. 1972. The New Companion to the Literature of Wales. Cardiff: University of Wales Press. Pages 371-373.
