= Six (Mansun album) =

Studio album by Mansun
- Released: 7 September 1998
- Recorded: 1998
- Genre: Progressive pop; progressive rock; art rock
- Length: 70:37
- Label: Parlophone
- Producer: Paul Draper, Mark Stent and Mike Hunter

Mansun chronology
Attack of the Grey Lantern (1997)	Six (1998)	Little Kix (2000)

Singles from Six
- 1. "Legacy" Released: 29 June 1998; 2. "Being a Girl" Released: 24 August 1998; 3. "Negative" Released: 26 October 1998; 4. "Six" Released: 1 February 1999

Six is the second album by English alternative rock band Mansun, released in September 1998 via Parlophone. It was released in the UK and Europe on 7 September 1998, and in the US on 20 April 1999, with an alternative running order, different artwork, and the re-recorded single version of the title track. In an interview prior to the release of Six, Paul Draper stated that the "interlude" "Witness to a Murder (Part Two)" was included to separate the album into two parts as a tribute to old-style vinyl albums.

== Background ==
The main musical palette of the album were created out of guitar ideas that Paul Draper and Dominic Chad coined at soundchecks, on their tour bus and in hotel rooms, and were then "blended into wordy and complex tableaux."

== Recording ==
The majority of Six was written from scratch after Mansun returned from their Attack of the Grey Lantern tour. In 2018, Draper noted about the writing process:

Yeah, so what happened was we went out and built a fan base, and then we came back from tour and rented a house in London without having written a thing. We went in and started jamming on the first day. The opening track "Six" was a leftover from Attack called "More." That was all we had to start, and we recorded everything chronologically as we came up with it.

Wanting to capitalise upon their increasing live skills, the band recorded the basic tracks on Six live in the studio, firstly at Liverpool's Parr Street Studios and then later at London's Olympic Sound Studios. Chad said: "There's a lot of horrible, dirty sounds on there as a result. There's all sorts of spill – guitars over the drum takes, drums over the bass – purely because we were just in a room together. I think that if a producer had tried to clean it up and separate it all, it just wouldn't have the same feel."

After the basic tracks were recorded, the group added on the album's "nutsy effects," a lot of which were guitar effects. The band decided that if any of them wrote a new idea to jam, such as a riff, they also had to create a new guitar sound. They repeatedly used the TC Electronics Fireworx, a then-new rack processor which contributed to some "fantastic sounds." Chad said that "it doesn't so much process the sound of the guitar as completely change it. On some patches the notes you fret just trigger sounds; it's quite random." Other pedals used include a Colorsound Tone Bender, a Daddy-O, an Electro-Harmonix Big Muff, a Rat fuzz and, in helping to achieve a "really shitty chorus sound," a vintage Electro-Harmonix Clone Theory.

In addition to usage of the Eventide DSP4000 and Bell BF20 flangers, the band also put Chad's guitar through a Korg synthesiser on occasion while messing around with the synth's filters, while having to tape one of the synthesiser's keys down prior to playing guitar through it. Draper also used the Roland G-707, an early guitar synthesiser ("It's been mostly old gear, but new sounds,") while Chad developed a liking for using vari-speed techniques when recording, "slowing the tape down to half-time, transposing the guitar line down about four semi-tones and then playing it back at normal speed. It all helps make the tones interesting."

== Composition ==
Draper said the segues between songs were influenced by side two of the Beatles' Abbey Road (1969) and side one of Prince's Parade (1986).

The ending of "Fall Out," which re-incorporates the riff from "Legacy", features an Eventide DSP4000 coupled with "an old MXR Flanger". As Chad played the riff through the MXR pedal, Draper twirled the knobs simultaneously, contributing to a "really fucked up sound." "Fall Out" also incorporates elements of The Nutcracker by Pyotr Ilyich Tchaikovsky.

The main riff of "Anti-Everything" uses a Bel BF20 rack flanger. Chad recalled "it's on the verge of being out-of-tune-y, but it's a fantastic noise."

== Packaging ==
Six was influenced by The Prisoner and the penny-farthing icon from the show (pictured) features on the album sleeve and CD disc.

The album's sleeve art was a painting produced by Max Schindler and commissioned especially for the album. It contains many references to personal interests and obsessions of the band, such as a TARDIS and an image of Tom Baker as Doctor Who, and Patrick McGoohan as Number 6 (sitting in the ball chair commonly occupied by the different Number 2's), from The Prisoner. There is also a depiction of Winnie the Pooh standing close to a painting that may be a reproduction of Vinegar tasters, a Taoist allegorical painting. Dominic Chad is known to be both a Taoist and a fan of A. A. Milne, and the album's name is in fact a reference to Milne's book Now We Are Six.

The cover art also depicts a number of (perhaps non-existent) books, including:

- Life as a Series of Compromises by Graham Langdon
- Who on Earth is Tom Baker? by Tom Baker (the actor's autobiography)
- Nineteen Eighty Four by George Orwell (1984 was one of the album's working titles)
- The 120 Days of Sodom by Marquis de Sade (referenced in the lyrics of "Legacy")
- The Book of Mormon (referenced in the lyrics of "Cancer")
- The Bible Code by Michael Drosnin (referenced in the lyrics of "Inverse Midas")
- People Places, a talk given by architect Richard Rogers (referenced in the lyrics of "Anti-Everything")
- The House at Pooh Corner by A. A. Milne (referenced in the lyrics of "Shotgun")
- Dianetics by L. Ron Hubbard (referenced in the lyrics of "Negative")
- The Schizoid Man refers to an episode title of The Prisoner
- Paint It Black by Geoffrey Giuliano (a book on the death of Rolling Stones guitarist Brian Jones, an important influence on Dominic Chad)

The inlay booklet includes enlarged images of the piles of books from the cover, making it easier to read the authors and titles.

== Release ==
Six was released in September 1998, it débuted at #6 on the UK Albums Chart. The album spawned four singles, each one was altered for single release. The alterations ranged from subtle to dramatic. The first single "Legacy" and the third single "Negative" were given slight trims. Conversely, "Being a Girl" was literally cut in half with the opening two-minute section labelled 'Part One' and released as a single. The title track was completely re-recorded with producer Arthur Baker and released in the winter of 1999. "Legacy" was the most successful single and reached the top ten on the UK singles chart. "Being a Girl (Part One)" and "Six" made the top twenty, while "Negative" peaked at #27.

== Critical reception ==
Professional ratings
Review scores
Source	Rating
AllMusic	3/5 stars
The Guardian	4/5 stars
Melody Maker	4.5/5 stars
NME	6/10
Pitchfork	7.8/10
Q	2/5 stars
Record Collector	4/5 stars
Select	3/5
The Times	8/10
Uncut	5/5 stars

In a rave review for Uncut, critic Steve Sutherland described Six as "the most ridiculous, confusing, complicated, over-reaching, frustrating, inventive, hyperactive, surprising and liberating record to yet appear from the post-Britpop stable." Jon Garrett of PopMatters conceded that the album is "not for everyone" but was impressed by its "debauched beauty", calling it "the sound of a band collectively snubbing its fan base and smashing expectation to spectacular effect."

== Track listing ==
All tracks are written by Paul Draper; except where indicated.

Part One
No.	Title	Writer(s)	Length
1.	"Six"		8:07
2.	"Negative"	Draper, Dominic Chad, Stove King, Andie Rathbone	4:21
3.	"Shotgun"	Draper, Chad	6:38
4.	"Inverse Midas"	Chad	1:44
5.	"Anti-Everything"		2:25
6.	"Fall Out"		3:47
7.	"Serotonin"		2:33
8.	"Cancer"		9:31

Interlude
No.	Title	Writer(s)	Length
9.	"Witness to a Murder (Part Two)" (monologue performed by Tom Baker)	Chad	3:06

Part Two
No.	Title	Writer(s)	Length
10.	"Television"	Draper, Chad	8:21
11.	"Special / Blown It (Delete as Appropriate)"		5:32
12.	"Legacy"		6:33
13.	"Being a Girl"		7:59
14.	"I Care" (Japanese only bonus track)		3:42

=== US track listing ===
The US release of Six restructured the track listing considerably at the behest of Epic Records. The chapters and interlude were removed and the running order was rearranged with "Legacy" and "Shotgun" swapped. More significant was the omission of "Inverse Midas" and "Witness to a Murder (Part Two)" both of which were composed by Dominic Chad. The full eight-minute recording of the title track is substituted by the Arthur Baker re-recording. Small edits appear throughout the remaining track listing: the opening guitar from "Legacy", the feedback from the opening of "Negative" and the removal of silence from the end of "Cancer".

All tracks are written by Paul Draper; except where indicated.

No.	Title	Writer(s)	Length
1.	"Six (Baker Mix)"		3:56
2.	"Negative"	Draper, Chad, King, Rathbone	4:16
3.	"Legacy"		6:19
4.	"Anti Everything"		2:25
5.	"Fall Out"		3:47
6.	"Serotonin"		2:33
7.	"Cancer"		9:16
8.	"Television"	Draper, Chad	8:21
9.	"Special / Blown It (Delete as Appropriate)"		5:18
10.	"Shotgun"	Draper, Chad	6:27
11.	"Being a Girl"		8:00

== Personnel ==
Mansun

- Paul Draper – lead vocals, rhythm guitar
- Dominic Chad – lead guitar, backing vocals, piano, harpsichord
- Stove King – bass
- Andie Rathbone – drums, percussion

Tom Baker on track 9 spoken word Backing Vocals by Maryetta Midgley and Vernon Midgley

Production

- Paul Draper – producer
- Mark 'Spike' Stent – co-producer
- Mike Hunter – engineer, additional production
- Paul Walton – engineer
- Jan Kybeert – Pro Tools
- Matthew Vaughn – Pro Tools on "Legacy"
- Pennie Smith – band photography

== B-sides ==
from "Legacy" (Eight EP)

- "Can't Afford to Die"
- "Spasm of Identity"
- "Check Under the Bed"
- "Wide Open Space (The Perfecto Remix)"
- "GSOH"
- "Face in the Crowd"
- "The Impending Collapse of it All (Acoustic Version)"
- "Ski Jump Nose (Acoustic Version)"

from "Being a Girl (Part One)" (Nine EP)

- "Hideout"
- "Railings"
- "I Care"
- "Been Here Before"
- "Wide Open Space (Trouser Enthusiast Mix)"
- "Mansun's Only Acoustic Song"

from "Negative" (Ten EP)

- "When the Wind Blows"
- "King of Beauty"
- "I Deserve What I Get"
- "Take It Easy Chicken (Live)"
- "Mansun's Only Live Song"

from "Six" (Eleven EP)

- "Church of the Drive Thru Elvis"
- "But the Trains Run on Time"
- "What It's Like to Be Hated"
- "Being a Girl (Parts One & Two) (Live)"
- "Live Television"

== Chart positions ==
Chart (1998)	Peak position
Japanese Oricon Album Chart	40
Scottish Albums Chart	14
UK Albums Chart	6
