= Dolauhirion Bridge =

Bridge on the River Towy, Wales

Coordinates: 52.0091°N 3.8039°W

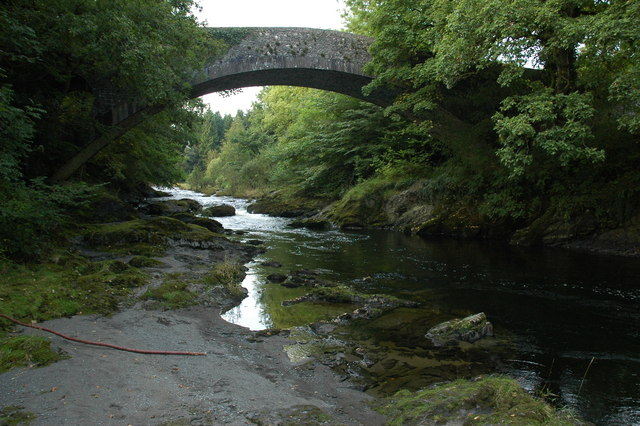
Pont Dolauhirion-Dolauhirion Bridge

Dolauhirion Bridge (Welsh: Pont Dolauhirion) is a single arch stone bridge which carries road traffic from Llandovery to Cilycwm over the River Towy (Welsh: Afon Tywi) in Carmarthenshire, Wales. It is a grade I listed structure. At the time the bridge was built the road was the main coach road from Llandovery to Lampeter.

Various wooden bridges had stood at the site until the present stone bridge was built in 1773 by the minister and bridge builder William Edwards. He had built several single arch stone bridges in Wales, particularly at Pontypridd, where he had constructed what was then the biggest single arch (140 feet (43 metres)) in the world. The Dolauhirion bridge has a span of 83 feet (25 metres) and a carriageway width of 12 feet (3.7 metres) with parapets. Typical of Edward's designs the bridge has circular openings in the spandrels, which relieve stress on the main structure in times of flood, and reduce weight and thus pressure on the arch.
