= Negative (song) =

"Negative (Ten EP)"

Single by Mansun

from the album Six
- Released: 26 October 1998 (UK); 13 January 1999 (Japan)
- Recorded: 1998
- Genre: Progressive rock, alternative rock, experimental rock
- Length: 4:21; 3:46 (Edit/Single Version)
- Label: Parlophone; Toshiba EMI (Japan)
- Songwriter(s): Paul Draper, Dominic Chad, Stove, Andie Rathbone
- Producer(s): Paul Draper, Mark 'Spike' Stent

Mansun singles chronology
"Being a Girl (Part One)" (1998)	"Negative (Ten EP)" (1998)	"Six" (1999)

"Negative" is a song by the English alternative rock band Mansun. The song was written by Paul Draper, Dominic Chad, Stove and Andie Rathbone. It was recorded and produced by Paul Draper and Mark 'Spike' Stent during sessions for the group's second studio album. The song was released as the third single in 1998 from the group's second album, Six. Despite being one of the album's more traditional songs the single peaked low at #27 on the UK Singles Chart, breaking the group's run of seven consecutive top twenty singles.

The music video for "Negative" was directed by Jamie Thraves.

== Track listing ==
All tracks are written by Paul Draper and Dominic Chad; except where indicated.

UK Limited edition clear 7" vinyl
No.	Title	Writer(s)	Length
1.	"Negative (Edit)"	Paul Draper, Dominic Chad, Stove King, Andie Rathbone	3:46
2.	"Mansun's Only Live Song" (recorded live at Barrowlands, Glasgow)	Paul Draper	5:50

UK CD one (Includes a free poster)
No.	Title	Writer(s)	Length
1.	"Negative (Edit)"	Paul Draper, Dominic Chad, Stove King, Andie Rathbone	3:46
2.	"When the Wind Blows"		4:50
3.	"King of Beauty"		4:56

UK CD two
No.	Title	Writer(s)	Length
1.	"Negative (LP Version)"	Paul Draper, Dominic Chad, Stove King, Andie Rathbone	4:21
2.	"I Deserve What I Get"		3:37
3.	"Take It Easy Chicken (Live)" (recorded live at Barrowlands, Glasgow)	Paul Draper	9:33

Japan CD EP
No.	Title	Writer(s)	Length
1.	"Negative (Single Version)"	Paul Draper, Dominic Chad, Stove King, Andie Rathbone	3:46
2.	"Mansun's Only Live Song" (recorded live at Barrowlands, Glasgow)	Paul Draper	5:50
3.	"When the Wind Blows"		4:50
4.	"King of Beauty"		4:56
5.	"I Deserve What I Get"		3:37
6.	"Take It Easy Chicken (Live)" (recorded live at Barrowlands, Glasgow)	Paul Draper	9:33

== Personnel ==
Mansun

- Dominic Chad – lead guitar, backing vocals
- Paul Draper – lead vocals, rhythm guitar
- Andie Rathbone – drums
- Stove – bass

Production

- Paul Draper and Mark 'Spike' Stent – producer
- Mike Hunter – engineer, additional production ("King of Beauty")
- Mark 'Spike' Stent – mixing ("Negative", "When the Wind Blows")
- Ian Grimble – mixing ("King of Beauty", "I Deserve What I Get", "Take It Easy Chicken (Live)")
- Paul Walton – engineer
- Jan Kybeert – Pro Tools
- Pennie Smith – band photography

== Chart positions ==
Chart (1998)	Peak position
UK Singles Chart	27
Scottish Singles Chart	29
