= David Griffiths (portrait painter) =

Welsh portrait painter

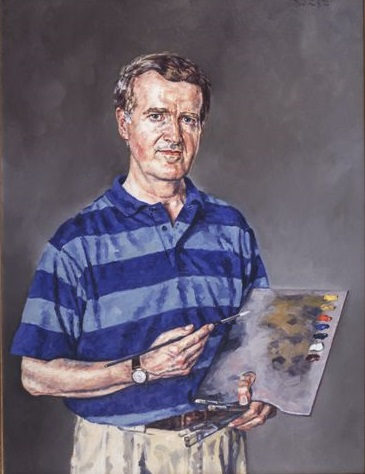
David Griffiths self-portrait

David Griffiths MBE (born 16 February 1939) is a Welsh portrait painter.

== Biography ==
He was born to a Welsh family in Liverpool, England, but the family moved to Pwllheli when he was seven. He studied at the Slade School of Fine Art, London under the direction of Professor Sir William Coldstream.

Griffiths had an annual summer show in Pwllheli in the 1960s. He met art collector Mary Yapp and, in 1965, they formed an art gallery together in Cardiff (later the Albany Gallery), though Griffiths left the partnership after 6 months to concentrate on his paintings.

He is known as U.K. portrait painter. David Griffiths' output of work include portraits of royalty, ambassadors, archbishops, Lords Chancellor, distinguished parliamentarians, and well-known musicians and actors. His portrait of Prince Charles on the occasion of Charles' investiture as Prince of Wales in 1969 brought him to general notice. He has also painted William Stamps Farish III (ex-U.S. Ambassador to the United Kingdom), Enoch Powell, and Welsh notables including Barry John, Gwynfor Evans, John Meurig Thomas, Lord Tonypandy (as Speaker of the House of Commons), Siân Phillips, Bryn Terfel and Sir Geraint Evans.

The Midland Bank sponsored a major exhibition of his work at the 1970 National Eisteddfod. In 2002, the National Library of Wales held a retrospective show of his work.

Over sixty of his oil paintings are in UK university or gallery collections.

He was appointed a Member of the Order of the British Empire (MBE) in the 2019 New Year Honours for services to Art, particularly Portrait Painting.
