= I Can Only Disappoint U =

2000 single by Mansun

Single by Mansun

from the album Little Kix
- Released: 25 July 2000 (Japan); 31 July 2000 (UK)
- Recorded: 2000, Astoria on the River Thames
- Genre: Alternative rock
- Length: 4:47; 4:21 (Single Mix)
- Label: Parlophone (Europe), Toshiba EMI (Japan)
- Songwriters: Paul Draper, Dominic Chad
- Producers: Hugh Padgham, Michael Hunter (co-producer)

Mansun singles chronology
"Six" (1999)	"I Can Only Disappoint U" (2000)	"Electric Man" (2000)

"I Can Only Disappoint U" is a song by the English alternative rock band Mansun. It was released in July 2000 as the lead single from the band's third album Little Kix, peaking at No. 8 and becoming the band's fourth and final top ten hit in the UK.

The song was written by frontman Paul Draper with lead guitarist Dominic Chad. It was recorded and produced by Hugh Padgham and co-producer Michael Hunter. A progressive house/trance remix by Paul Oakenfold preceded the release of the single during the summer of 2000.

In 2004, Mansun released a demo recording of the song on the compilation album Kleptomania. The demo was recorded by Paul Draper alone with guitar overdubs by Dominic Chad.

In 2013, Dev Hynes, recording under his Blood Orange name, recorded a cover of the song. The song was retitled "Always Let U Down" and released on his second studio album Cupid Deluxe.

== Track listing ==
All tracks are written by Dominic Chad and Paul Draper; Except "Golden Stone" written by Dominic Chad.

CD 1 (Includes a free poster)
No.	Title	Length
1.	"I Can Only Disappoint U (Single Mix)"	4:21
2.	"Decisions, Decisions"	6:03
3.	"Repair Man"	4:03

CD 2
No.	Title	Length
1.	"I Can Only Disappoint U (LP Mix)"	4:47
2.	"My Idea Of Fun"	4:00
3.	"Golden Stone"	4:35

Cassette
No.	Title	Length
1.	"I Can Only Disappoint U (Single Mix)"	4:21
2.	"My Idea Of Fun"	4:00
3.	"Repair Man"	4:03

12" vinyl promo
No.	Title	Length
1.	"I Can Only Disappoint U (Perfecto Club Mix)"	6:37
2.	"I Can Only Disappoint U (Perfecto Instrumental)"

CD EP (Japan)
No.	Title	Length
1.	"I Can Only Disappoint U (Single Mix)"	4:21
2.	"My Idea Of Fun"	4:00
3.	"Golden Stone"	4:35
4.	"Decisions, Decisions"	6:03
5.	"Repair Man"	4:03
6.	"I Can Only Disappoint U (Perfecto Club Mix)"	6:37

== Personnel ==
Mansun

- Dominic Chad – electric guitar, backing vocals, piano, lead vocals ("Golden Stone").
- Paul Draper – lead vocals, acoustic guitar, keyboards
- Andie Rathbone – drums, percussion
- Stove – bass

Production

- Hugh Padgham – producer ("I Can Only Disappoint U", "Decisions, Decisions", "Repair Man"), Mixing ("Decisions, Decisions")
- Mike Hunter – producer ("Repair Man", "My Idea Of Fun", "Golden Stone"), co-producer ("I Can Only Disappoint U", "Decisions, Decisions", "Repair Man"), mixing ("Repair Man", "My Idea Of Fun", "Golden Stone"), engineer ("My Idea Of Fun", "Golden Stone")
- Mark 'Spike' Stent – mixing ("I Can Only Disappoint U")
- Anne Dudley – strings ("Decisions, Decisions")
- Anton Corbijn – photography
- Alex Hutchinson – design

== Chart positions ==
Chart (2000)	Peak position
UK Singles Chart	8
Scottish Singles Chart	9
