= Mike Jones (painter) =

Welsh painter (1941–2022)

Mike Jones (1941 – 9 January 2022) was a Welsh painter whose work was inspired by the coal miners and working people of South Wales.

== Biography ==
Born in 1941, Jones grew up in the village of Godrergraig, where his father was a coal miner (also running the Bird in Hand pub). When Jones lost an eye at the age of nine, his surgeon suggested he start drawing to help improve his coordination. Though he was encouraged to paint by his headmaster, Jones was discouraged from going to the nearby Swansea School of Art, with his parents preferring him to find a more reliable job.

After becoming friends with painters Josef Herman and Will Roberts, Jones developed an interest in the subject of coal miners. He obsessively filled sketchbooks with drawings of local working people. He became known as an important chronicler of working life in Wales and, in later life, a link to a former industrial life of the area. He was championed by Mary Yapp and her gallery, the Albany Gallery in Cardiff, which held regular solo exhibitions. The National Library of Wales holds examples of Jone's work.

Jones' final exhibition was held to mark his 80th birthday, in October 2021 at Tŷ’r Gwrhyd, Pontardawe.

Jones worked from an attic studio at his home in Pontardawe. He died on 9 January 2022, aged 80.
