= Newbridge-on-Usk =

Village in Monmouthshire, Wales

Coordinates: 51.6486°N 2.8917°W

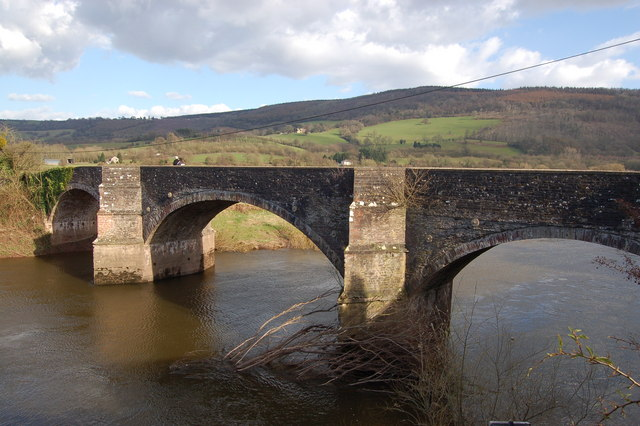
The bridge at Newbridge-on-Usk

Newbridge-on-Usk (Welsh: Pontnewydd ar Wysg) is a hamlet in the village and parish of Tredunnock, near Usk, Monmouthshire, south east Wales, in the United Kingdom.

== Location ==
Newbridge-on-Usk is located on the River Usk 5 miles (8 km) to the north of Newport in the Vale of Usk. Situated below the steep Wentwood escarpment, it lies between the historic towns of Caerleon and Usk, about 4 miles (6.4 km) from the junction 24 of the M4 motorway via the B4237 Coldra, B4236 and Catsash Road.

== History and amenities ==
At the river is the Newbridge Inn, once owned by radio and television presenter Chris Evans. The inn is owned and run by the Celtic Manor Resort.

The elegant red sandstone three-arched New Bridge dates from 1779 and is said to have been designed by William Edwards. It is Grade II* listed. It stands at the Normal Tidal Limit (NTL) of the River Usk.
