= New Bridge, Newbridge-on-Usk =

Bridge in Wales, United Kingdom

New Bridge
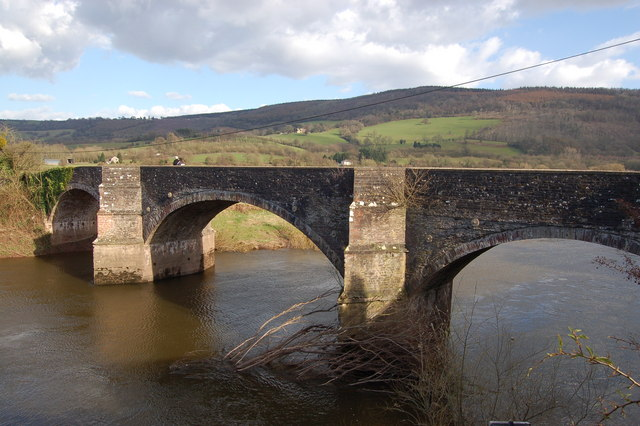
- "an elegant Georgian triple-arched bridge"
- Coordinates: 51.6487°N 2.89°W
- Carries: road traffic
- Crosses: River Usk
- Locale: Newbridge-on-Usk, Monmouthshire, Wales

Characteristics
- No. of spans: 3
- Piers in water: 2

History
- Designer: probably William Edwards
- Construction start: 1779

Listed Building – Grade II*
- Official name: New Bridge
- Designated: 22 June 2000
- Reference no.: 23490

New Bridge crosses the River Usk at Newbridge-on-Usk between Usk and Caerleon. The bridge carries the B4236. It was constructed in 1779, probably by William Edwards, a prominent civil engineer of Pontypridd, or by a member of his bridge-building dynasty. The bridge has Grade II* listed building status.

== History ==
An earlier crossing of the Usk at Newbridge was the medieval Tredynog Bridge, constructed in timber. Following its collapse, the present replacement was constructed in 1779. It was built by Walter Bowen and Christopher Thorn and its design is attributed to either William Edwards, or "a member of the celebrated Edwards family of bridge-builders".

== Architecture and description ==
The bridge is constructed of Old Red Sandstone ashlar. It has three arches, with two piers in water. The piers form pedestrian refuges on the bridge. The architectural historian John Newman describes the bridge as "an extremely fine design beautifully executed". The bridge is a Grade II* listed structure.
