= Pontardawe Arts Centre =

Multi-purpose cultural venue in Pontardawe, Neath Port Talbot, Wales

Coordinates: 51.71986°N 3.85017°W

- Address: Herbert Street; Pontardawe; Wales
- Owner: Neath Port Talbot council
- Capacity: 450

Website
- www.pontardaweartscentre.com

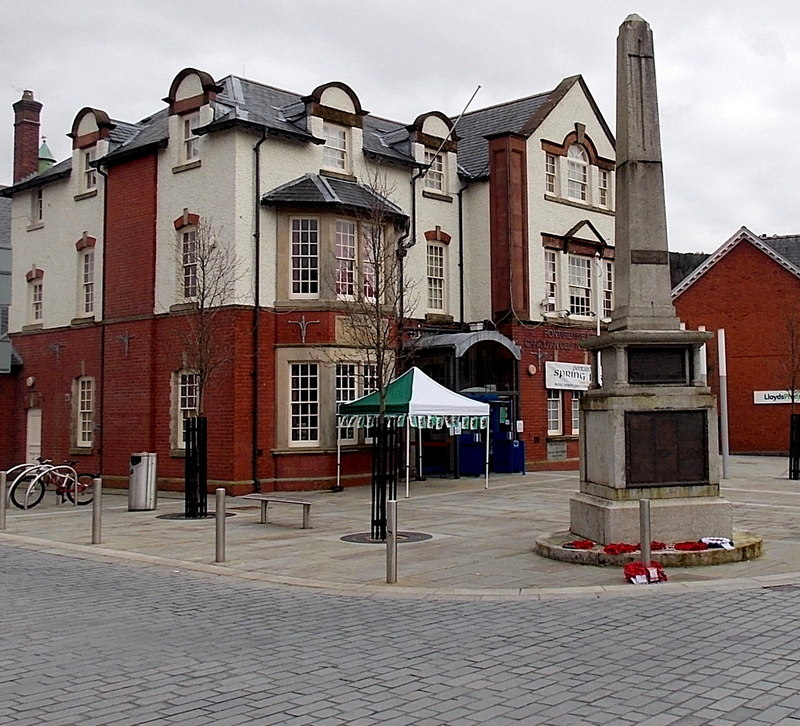
Image of the Pontardawe Arts Centre

Pontardawe Arts Centre is a multi-purpose cultural venue in Pontardawe, Neath Port Talbot, Wales. The building is owned by Neath Port Talbot County Borough Council and is located in Herbert Street.

The Arts Centre opened in October 1996. It was converted from the former Pontardawe Public Hall and Institute, built in 1908 and opened by Adelina Patti; the building had gone out of use and was derelict when a scheme to improve provision for the arts in the town was conceived by Lliw Valley Borough Council in 1993.

Pontardawe Arts Centre receives core funding from the Arts Council of Wales, and maintains a programme that includes:

- Drama – adult and child, Welsh language and English language
- Dance – classical and contemporary
- Comedy – comedy club and named comedians
- Music – roots, world, blues, rock/pop
- Entertainment – adult and child including pantomime
- Film – mainstream and specialist with resident film club

The building is also home to Oriel Lliw, a gallery which displays twelve exhibitions per annum by local, national and international artists; the Clydach and District Amateur Operatic Society; Class Act Theatre School, and the Pamela Miller School of Ballet.

== Facilities ==
- 450-seat digital & surround sound cinema and theatre (combined in one hall)
- Theatre performance facilities has excellent technical support.
- New refurbished performance studio replaced old snooker room.
- Art gallery
- Dance studios
- Bar
