= Pontardawe Tinplate Works =

Former tinplate works in Pontardawe, Wales

Coordinates: 51°42′54″N 3°51′19″W

Pontardawe Tinplate Works was a tinplate works in Pontardawe, Wales. The factory was founded in 1843 by William Parsons, as the Primrose Forge and Tinplate Works. In 1861, it was leased from him by William Gilbertson, by which time it comprised nine mills. The workforce was largely recruited from amongst mainly Welsh-speaking former coal miners after local seams had been exhausted.

The site of the works is now occupied by Cwmtawe Community School, Pontardawe Leisure Centre with the associated Ynysderw Playing Fields, and several stores.
