= William Edwards (architect) =

Welsh architect (1719–1789)

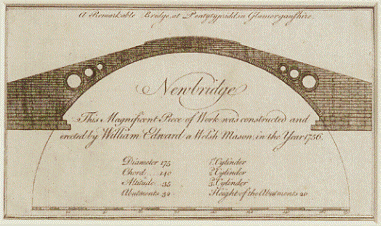
Newbridge, Pontypridd

William Edwards (February 1719 – 7 August 1789) was a Welsh Methodist minister who also practised as a stonemason, architect and bridge engineer.

Edwards was born the son of Edward David in Eglwysilan, Caerphilly County Borough in a small farmhouse, and began preaching in his early twenties. In 1745, he became joint pastor of a newly established Independent chapel at Groeswen, remaining in the post until his death.

He taught himself the rudiments of masonry and at the age of 27 was commissioned to build a bridge over the Taff for £500 and to maintain it for 7 years. After several attempts he succeeded and went on to build further bridges across south Wales.

On his death, he was buried in St Ilan's church in Eglwysilan, where his tomb is a grade II* listed structure.

Three of his sons (Thomas, David and Edward) also became bridge builders, two of whom built Newport bridge in 1801. A fourth son (William) was killed in action at Gibraltar.

== Early life ==
His father died when he was only two years old. William was brought up by his mother. Edwards' first employment was common farm work. But at the same time he was taking lessons in arithmetic from a neighbor in the evenings. Edwards soon become so expert in dry-stone wall building that he was extensively employed in repairing and building dry-stone walls for the neighboring farmers. His walls were observed to be so neat that he was everywhere in request.

== Career ==
In 1746, when it was proposed to throw a bridge over river Taff, he was employed to build it. However, Edwards had not sufficiently provided for the passage of the floods, which in certain seasons rush down from the Brecon Beacons. It proved to be a serious obstruction in the way of a heavy flood which swept down the valley about two years and a half after the bridge had been completed. Trees were torn up by the roots and carried down the stream and dammed the torrent. Force finally swept away arches and piers together, carrying the materials far down the river. Edward's second bridge was a failure because of daring experimentation. His friends generously came forward and helped him with the means of building his third bridge, which proved a complete success. The plan which he adopted, of more equally balancing the work and relieving the severe thrust upon the haunches, was to introduce three cylindrical holes or tunnels in the masonry at those parts of the bridge.

Among the more important of the later works of Edwards were the large bridge over the river Usk, at the town of Usk, in Monmouthshire; one, of three arches, over the river Tawe, near Swansea; another, of one arch of 95 feet span, over the same river near Morriston.

In 1750, he became an ordained preacher among the independents. Shortly after, he was chosen minister of congregation to which he belonged, and he continued to hold the office for about forty years, until his death.

== Famous bridges ==
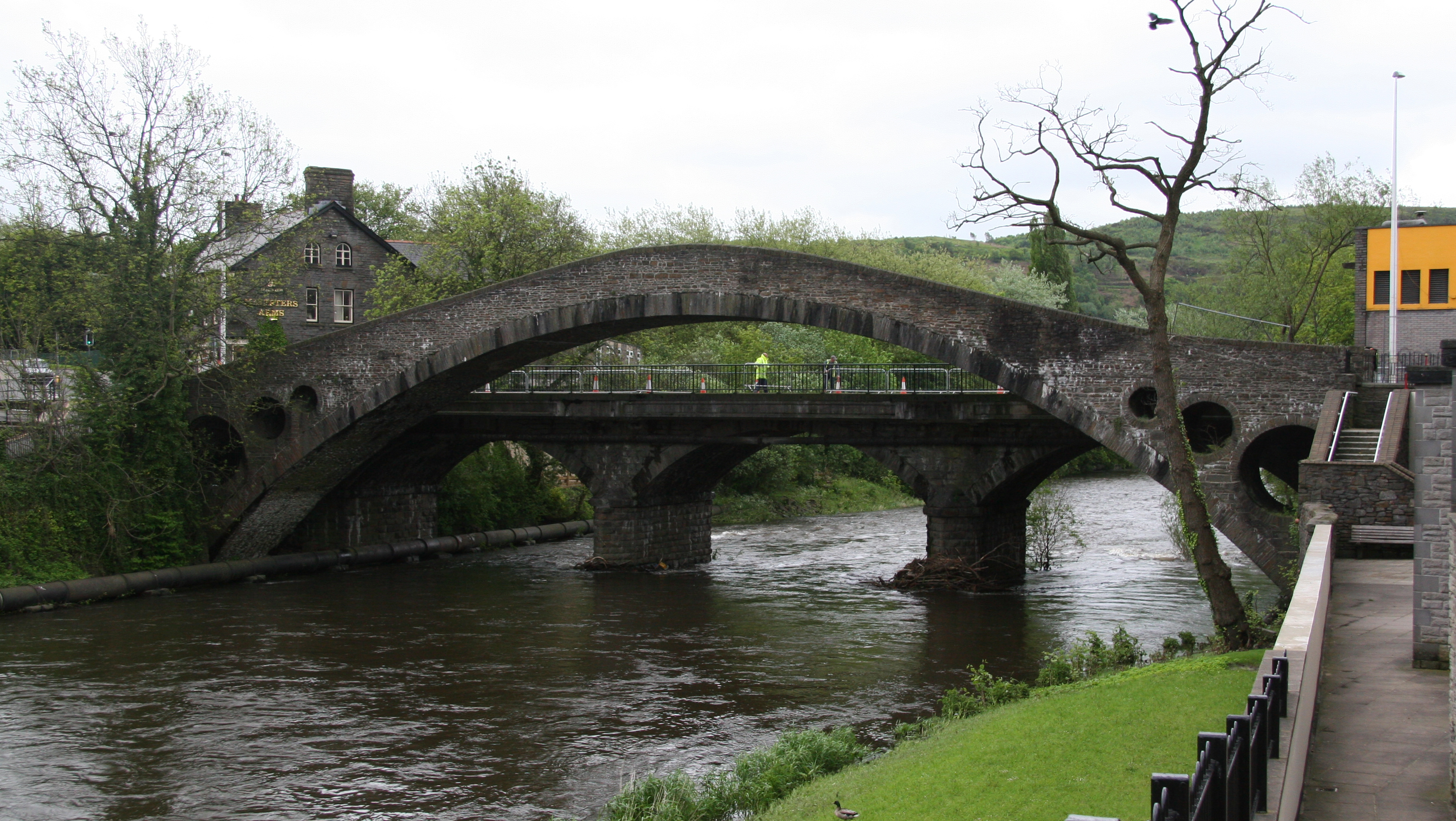
Old and new bridge in Pontypridd

Edwards' most famous creation was the Old Bridge at Pontypridd, built between 1746 and 1756. The contract included a "guarantee" clause, and Edwards actually constructed four successive bridges at the same site, with only the last surviving the torrential waters of the river Taff. The first bridge had three arches which were swept away by flood water after two and a half years. The second, a bold single arch design, was also swept away before completion. The third attempt failed due to the weight of the haunches causing the centre to fail.

At 140 ft, the fourth and final version was the largest single-span bridge in the world when it was completed, exceeding the previous largest, the Rialto Bridge in Venice, by some 42 feet. Edwards' master-stroke was to lighten the weight of the haunches by leaving "holes" in the structure. The resulting construction still stands today, although another bridge next to it carries modern traffic and Edwards bridge is only now used by pedestrians. The bridge opened in 1755 and celebrated its 250th anniversary in 2005.

Edwards also went on to build or design bridges in Aberafan, Betws, Cilycwm, Glasbury, Pontardawe and Usk, and was also responsible for the layout of Morriston, the planned industrial village near Swansea developed by the Swansea Valley industrialist Sir John Morris.

== Works by Edwards (and sons) ==
- c. 1740 Forge at Cardiff
- 1746–1756 Old Bridge, Pontypridd. 1 arch, 140 ft span.
- 1746–1752 Usk Bridge, Usk. 5 arches. Widened 1856.
- ? Beaufort Bridge. 3 arches. Demolished 1868.
- ? Pontardawe Bridge. 1 arch, 80 ft span.
- ? Betws Bridge. 1 arch, 45 ft span.
- 1760s Workshops at Morriston
- c. 1768 Aberafan Bridge, 1 arch, 70 ft span. Demolished 1842.
- c. 1768 Morriston new town.
- 1773 Dolauhirion Bridge. 1 arch, 84 ft span. Built by son Thomas Edwards.
- 1777 Glasbury Bridge. 7 arches. Built by son Thomas Edwards. Destroyed by flood, 1895.
- 1778 Wychtree Bridge. 1 arch, 95 ft span. Demolished 1959.
- 1779 New Bridge, Newbridge-on-Usk.
- 1782 Chapel of Libanus, Morriston (part-time)
- 1787 Cenarth Bridge, Carmarthenshire. Built by David.
- 1794 Usk Bridge, Brecon, widened by Thomas.
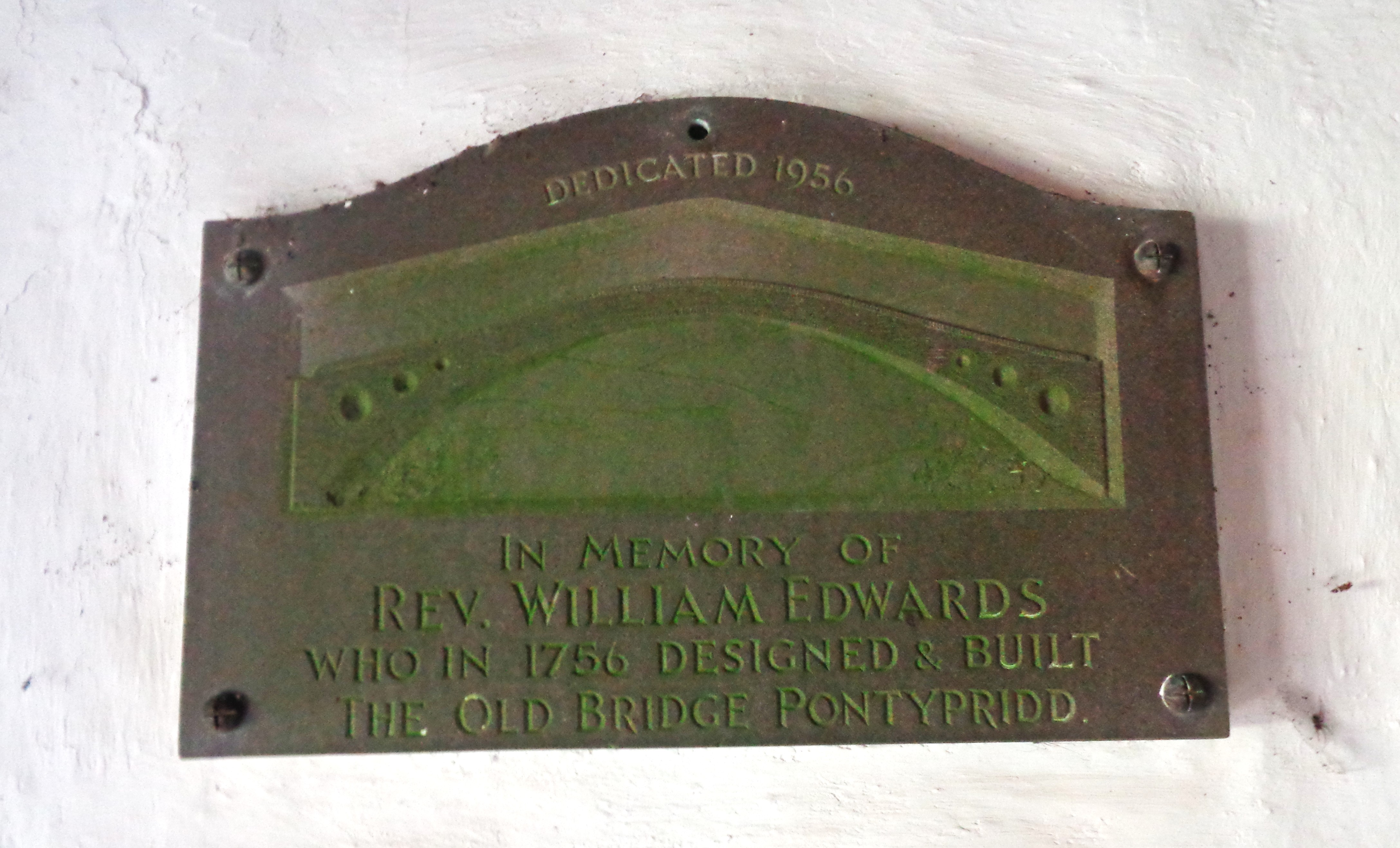
Memorial plaque. St Ilan's Church.

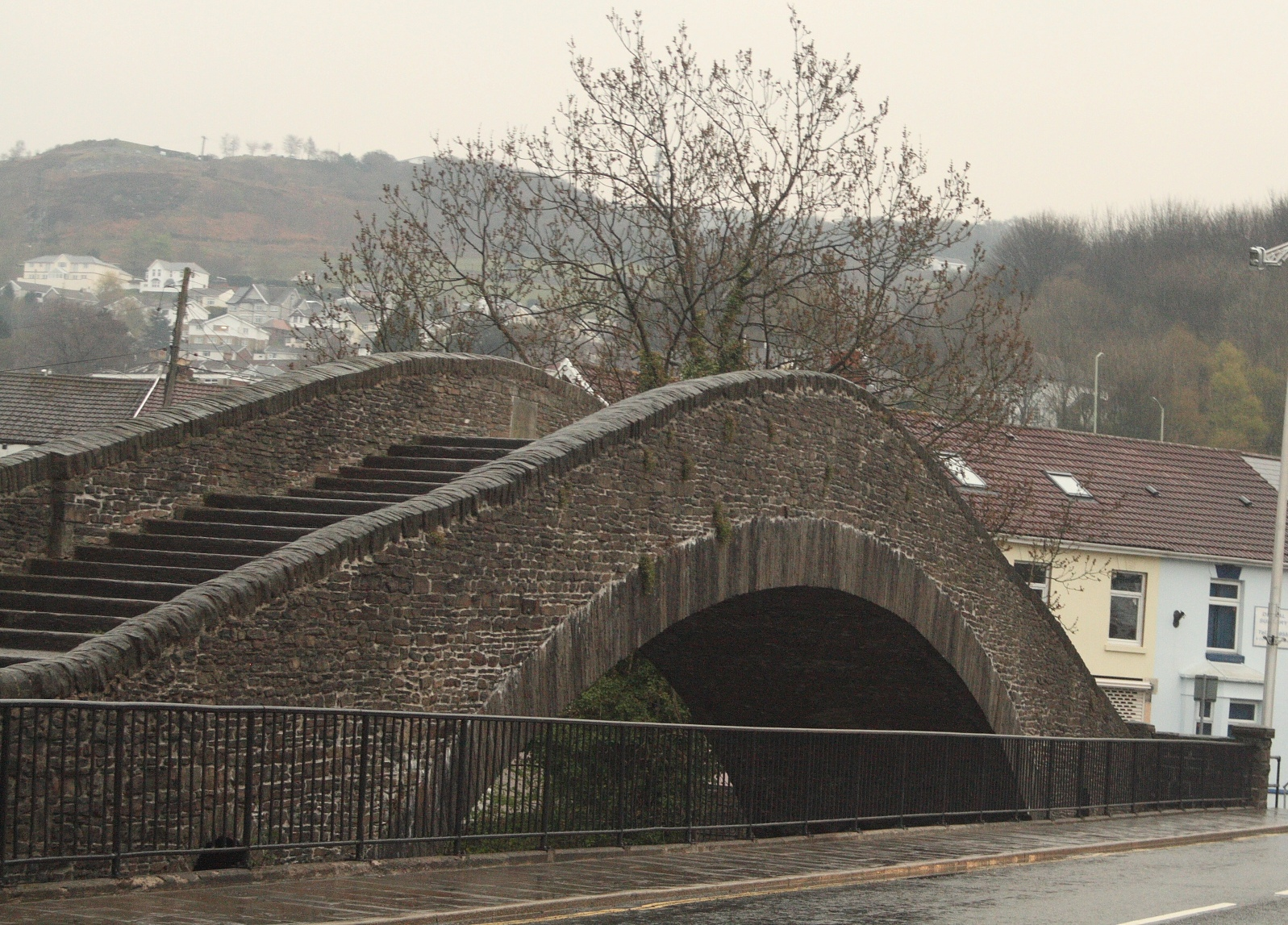
Old bridge in Pontypridd

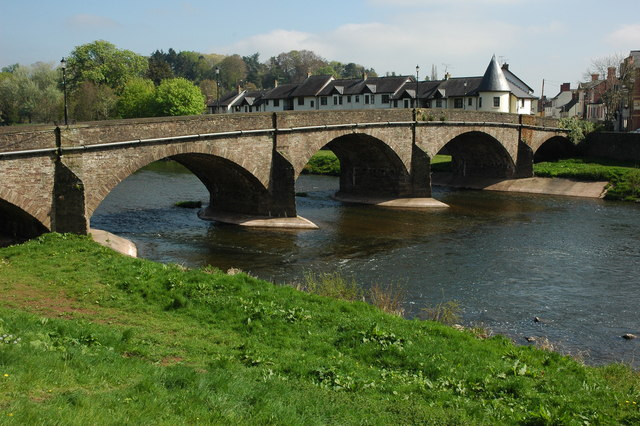
Usk bridge

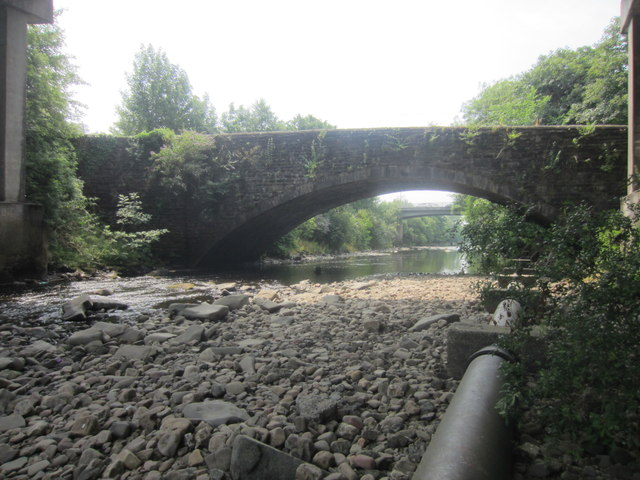
Old bridge at Pontardawe

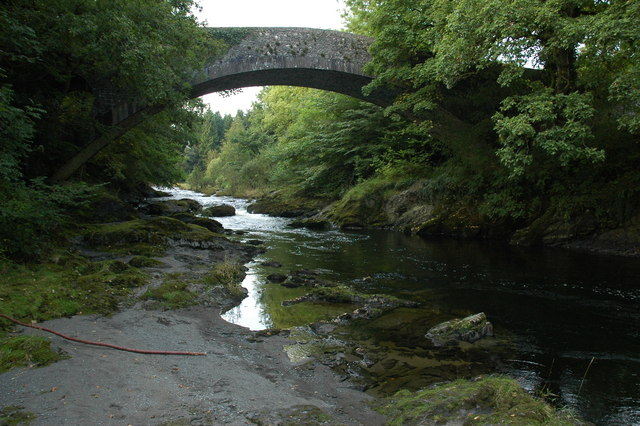
Dolauhirion bridge, Cilycwm

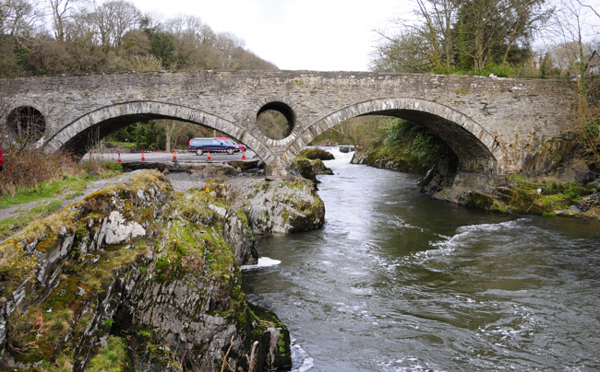
Cenarth bridge

== Literature ==
- Colvin H. A. (1995) Biographical Dictionary of British Architects 1600–1840, Yale University Press, 3rd edition London, 336–337. Provides listing of his work with references to further articles about Edwards.

== See also ==
- Dolauhirion Bridge
