= Usk Bridge (Brecon) =

Bridge in Brecon, mid-Wales

Coordinates: 51°56′51″N 3°23′38″W

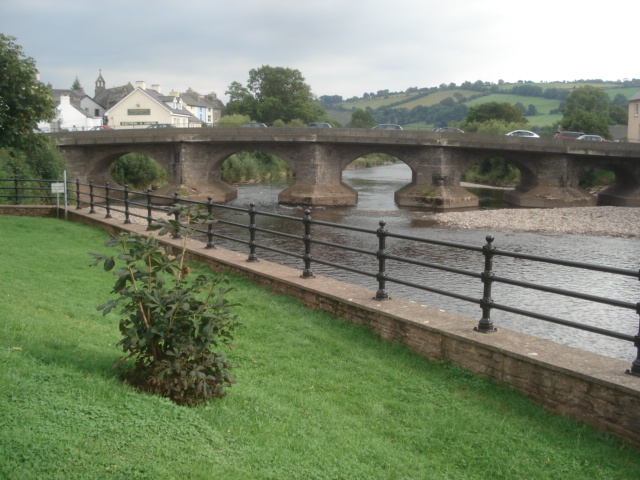
The Usk Bridge

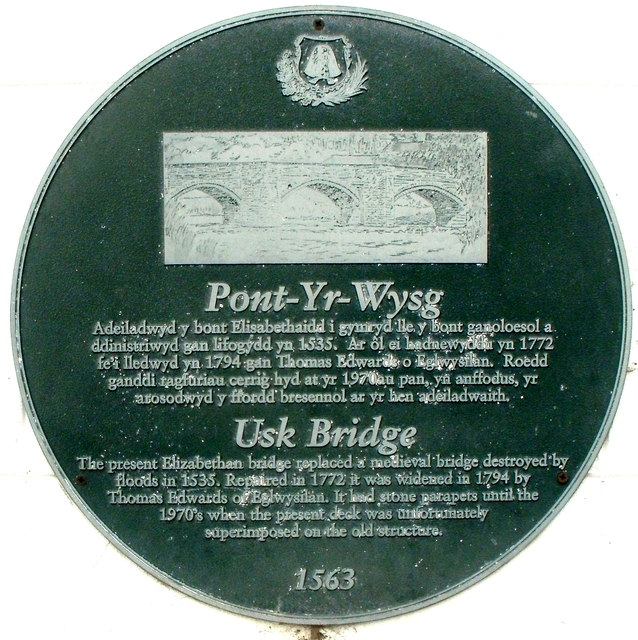
Usk Bridge plaque

The Usk Bridge (Welsh: Pont-Yr-Wysg) in Brecon, Powys, Wales is the town's oldest route over the River Usk. It carries the B4601 road, formerly the A40, between Brecon and Llanfaes.

== History ==
The river was fordable at Brecon and the date of construction of the original bridge here is uncertain. The existing stone bridge was built in 1563 and replaced an earlier bridge that was washed away in the floods of 1535. It was widened in 1794 by bridge builder Thomas Edwards, at a cost of £1,000 (equivalent to £150,000 in 2023)

During the 20th century it was widened further with the addition of metal framed footpaths on either side. In the 1950s it required widening to take modern road traffic and a new concrete bed, described as "functional and safe but extremely ugly", was laid on top of the original stone base.

== Status ==
The bridge is a Grade I listed structure.
