= Usk Bridge (Usk) =

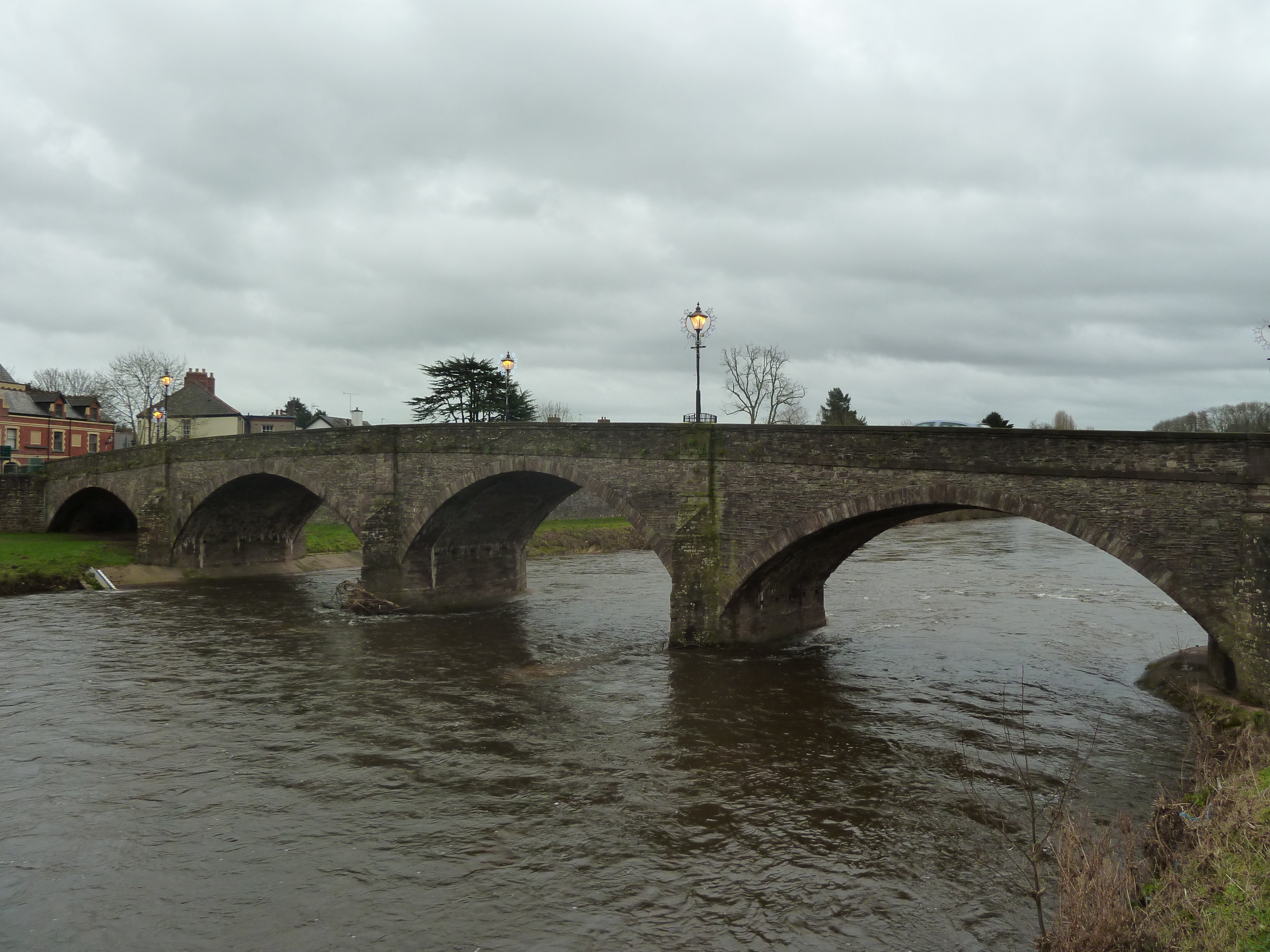
- "well-proportioned 18th and early 19th century road bridge"
- Coordinates: 51.7018°N 2.9068°W
- Carries: road traffic
- Crosses: River Usk
- Locale: Usk, Monmouthshire, Wales

Characteristics
- Material: Old Red Sandstone
- No. of spans: 5
- Piers in water: 2

History
- Designer: William Edwards
- Construction start: 1746-47
- Construction end: 1836-37

Statistics
- Daily traffic: road

Listed Building – Grade II*
- Official name: The Usk Bridge (partly in Llanbadoc Community)
- Designated: 1 April 1974
- Reference no.: 2129

The Usk Bridge, Usk, Monmouthshire, carries the A472 over the River Usk. It is the town's oldest crossing of the river and is a Grade II* listed structure.

== History and description ==
The existing stone bridge is constructed of Old Red Sandstone and is attributed to the Welsh bridge builder William Edwards. It was built between 1746 and 1747. It has five arches with pointed cutwaters between each arch. The bridge was widened in 1836-7, the widening maintaining the original appearance. The evidence of reconstruction can be seen in the arch soffits.

The bridge was designated a Grade II* listed structure in 1974. The architectural historian John Newman described it as "traditional but well-proportioned". It has been subject to considerable damage by traffic in the 21st century.

== See also ==
- List of bridges in Wales

== Sources ==
- Newman, John (2000). Gwent/Monmouthshire. The Buildings of Wales. London: Penguin. ISBN 0-14-071053-1.
