= Pontardawe =

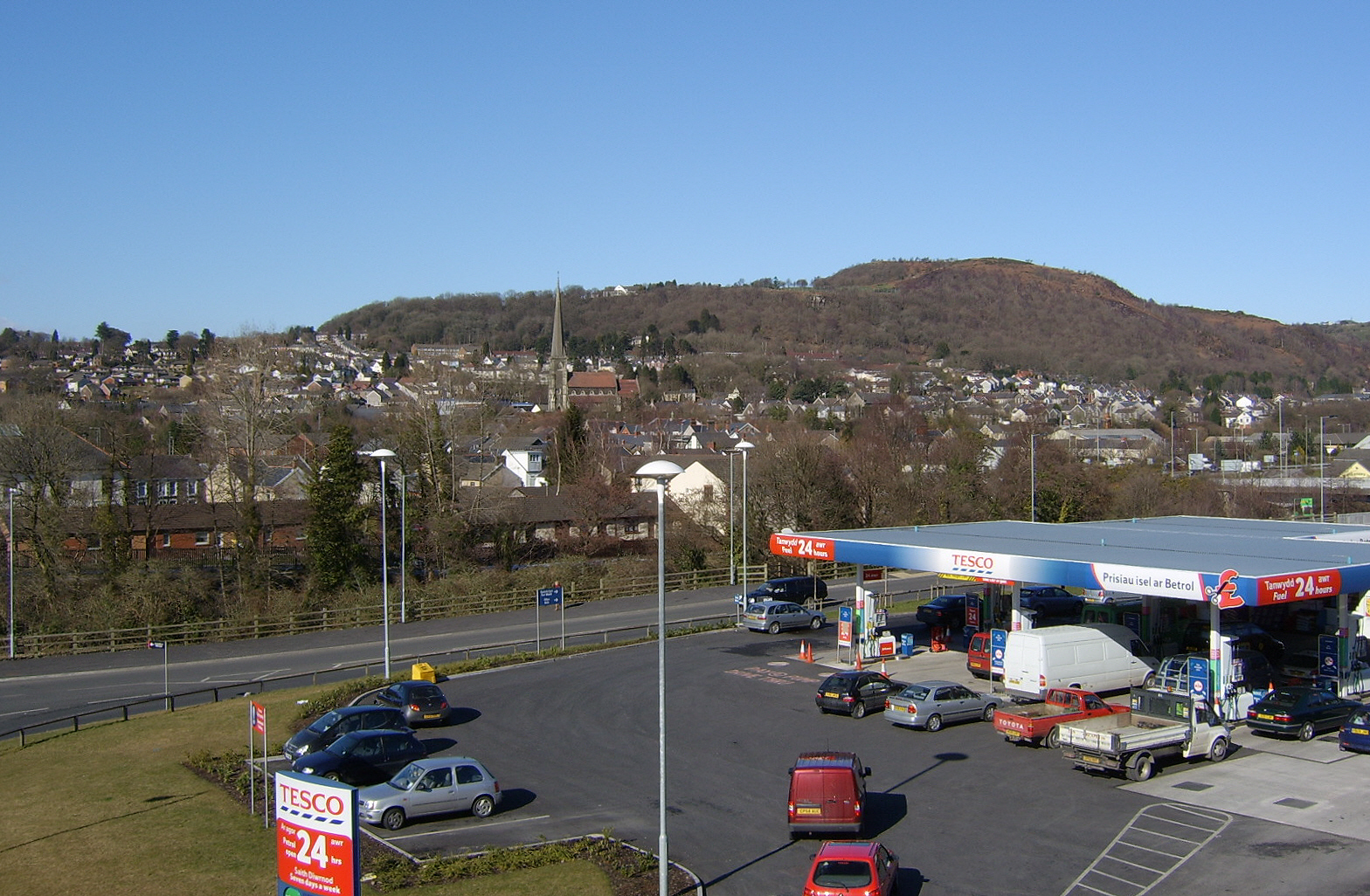
- Looking north over Pontardawe

- Location within Neath Port Talbot
- Population: 7,938 (2011 census)
- OS grid reference: SN721040
- Principal area: Neath Port Talbot
- Preserved county: West Glamorgan
- Country: Wales
- Sovereign state: United Kingdom
- Post town: SWANSEA
- Postcode district: SA8-SA9
- Dialling code: 01792
- Police: South Wales
- Fire: Mid and West Wales
- Ambulance: Welsh
- UK Parliament: Brecon, Radnor and Cwm Tawe
- Senedd Cymru – Welsh Parliament: Neath
- List of places UK Wales Neath Port Talbot 51.722°N 3.851°W Map of the community

Pontardawe (Welsh pronunciation: [pɔntarˈdawɛ]) is a town and a community in the lower Swansea Valley (Welsh: Cwmtawe). It had a population of approximately 7,172 in the 2021 Census for Pontardawe Parish, and forms part of the county borough of Neath Port Talbot.

On the opposite bank of the River Tawe is the village of Alltwen, part of the community of Cilybebyll, and is administered separately from Pontardawe. The town is at the crossroads of the A474 road and the A4067 road.

Pontardawe came into existence as a small settlement on the north-western bank of the River Tawe, where the drovers' road from Neath and Llandeilo crossed the river to go up the valley to Brecon. The National Cycle Route 43 from Swansea to Builth Wells passes through the town and the recreation ground.

== History ==
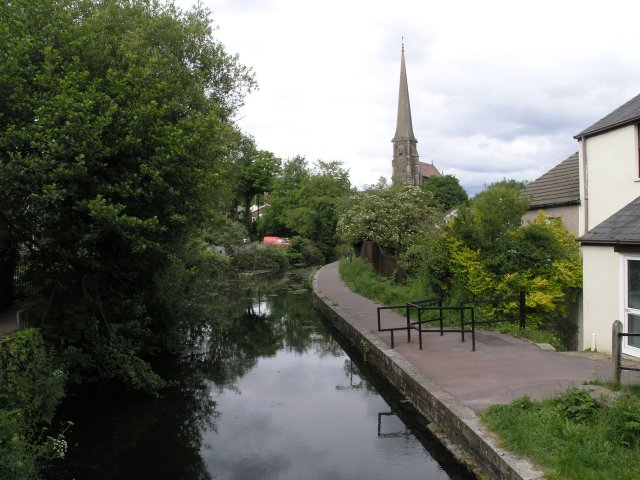
The Swansea Canal and the spire of the Church of St Peter

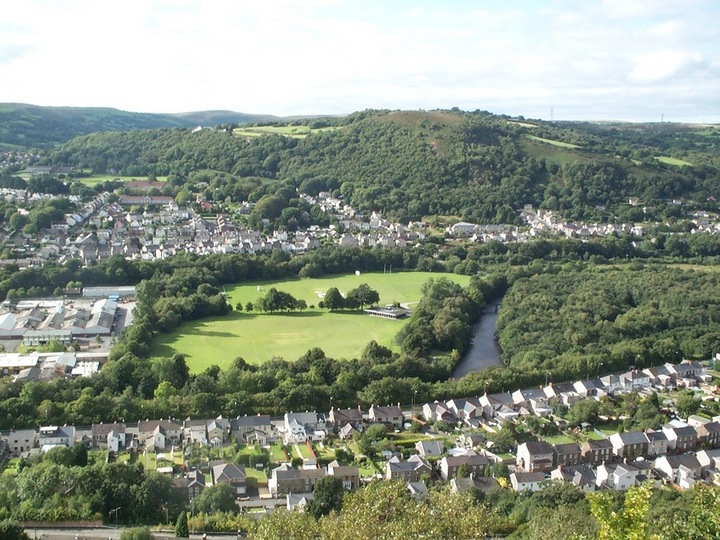
Pontardawe from the Graig above Alltwen

The name, which translates to "bridge on the Tawe", first appears on a map in 1729, as "Pont-ar-Dawye" in Emanuel Bowen's New and Accurate Map of South Wales. By 1796, the Swansea Canal had connected Pontardawe with Swansea Docks. Accessibility by canal enabled the industrial development of the area, which started with the Ynysderw ironworks in 1835. Close to the ironworks, tinplate and steelworks became the basis of the town's development during the latter part of the 19th century, exporting products to all parts of the world. The industrialist William Parsons of Neath (1795-1864) developed the town's early industry, but from 1861 onwards, for the next 90 years, the Gilbertson family were the most important proprietors in the town, manufacturing iron, steel and tinplate. As well as metalwork, there was also significant coal mining in the area and a pottery at Ynysmeudwy. These industries declined during the 20th century. Small engineering firms, motor maintenance, building supplies, and a health centre, are on the Alloy Industrial Estate.

The Church of St Peter, which has French-style architecture, was financed by William Parsons and completed in 1862.

From 1861 until 1964, a railway line connected Pontardawe with the rest of the valley and further afield. The Swansea Vale Railway (SVR) was founded in 1845 to develop and extend the short tramroad which had been opened nearly 30 years earlier to transport the coal down the lower part of the valley to the Swansea docks. It was extended to Pontardawe and Ystalyfera in 1861, and to Brynamman in 1863. On 1 October 1873, the SVR opened a branch from Ynysygeinon, near Ystalyfera, to Coelbren on the Neath and Brecon Railway, thereby connecting Pontardawe for the first time to the national rail network. The Midland Railway took over operation of the SVR from 1 September 1874; and by 1877 there were three passenger trains a day calling at Pontardawe in each direction, conveying through carriages between Swansea and Brecon, Hereford, Malvern, Worcester and Birmingham. Traffic on the route began declining between the wars, and passenger services to Brecon were withdrawn in 1931 and those to Brynamman in 1950. The railway line through Pontardawe finally closed to all traffic in 1964.

== Landmarks ==
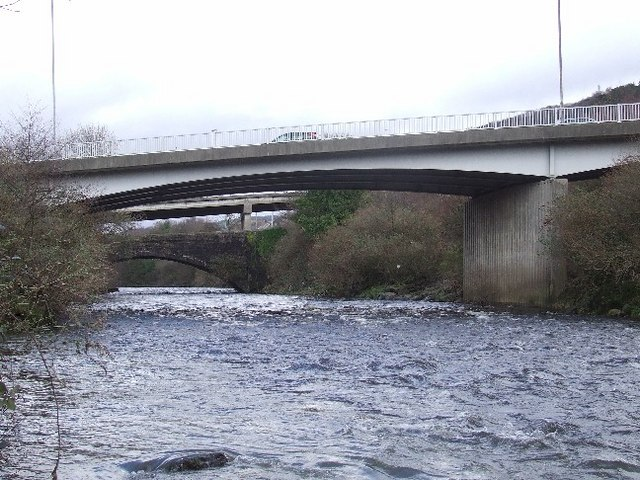
Three bridges at Pontardawe. The old stone bridge was built by William Edwards of Eglwsilan

The best-known landmark is the tall spire of St Peter's Church which dominates the centre of the town from its site on a high point of the valley floor close to the Swansea Canal.

The town includes two sections of the Swansea Canal with a total length of 2.5 miles (4.0 km). The old stone bridge of Pontardawe was built by William Edwards of Eglwsilan, a famous bridge builder. He also built the Old Bridge at Pontypridd, which was the longest single-span bridge in the world when it was constructed, as well as the bridge at Cenarth. Edwards was also responsible for the design of Morriston, a new town developed by the Swansea Valley industrialist Sir John Morris.

== Politics ==
Prior to local government reorganisation in 1974, Pontardawe and district was served by Pontardawe Rural District Council; this merged in 1974 to become part of Lliw Valley DC and was subsequently reorganised again when the Pontardawe area became a part of Neath Port Talbot county borough. Pontardawe Town Council is currently led by Plaid Cymru.

The constituency office of Jeremy Miles MS is in the town. As part of the South Wales West regional constituency, Pontardawe is also represented by Tom Giffard MS, Altaf Hussain MS, Sioned Williams MS, and Luke Fletcher MS.

== Music and arts ==
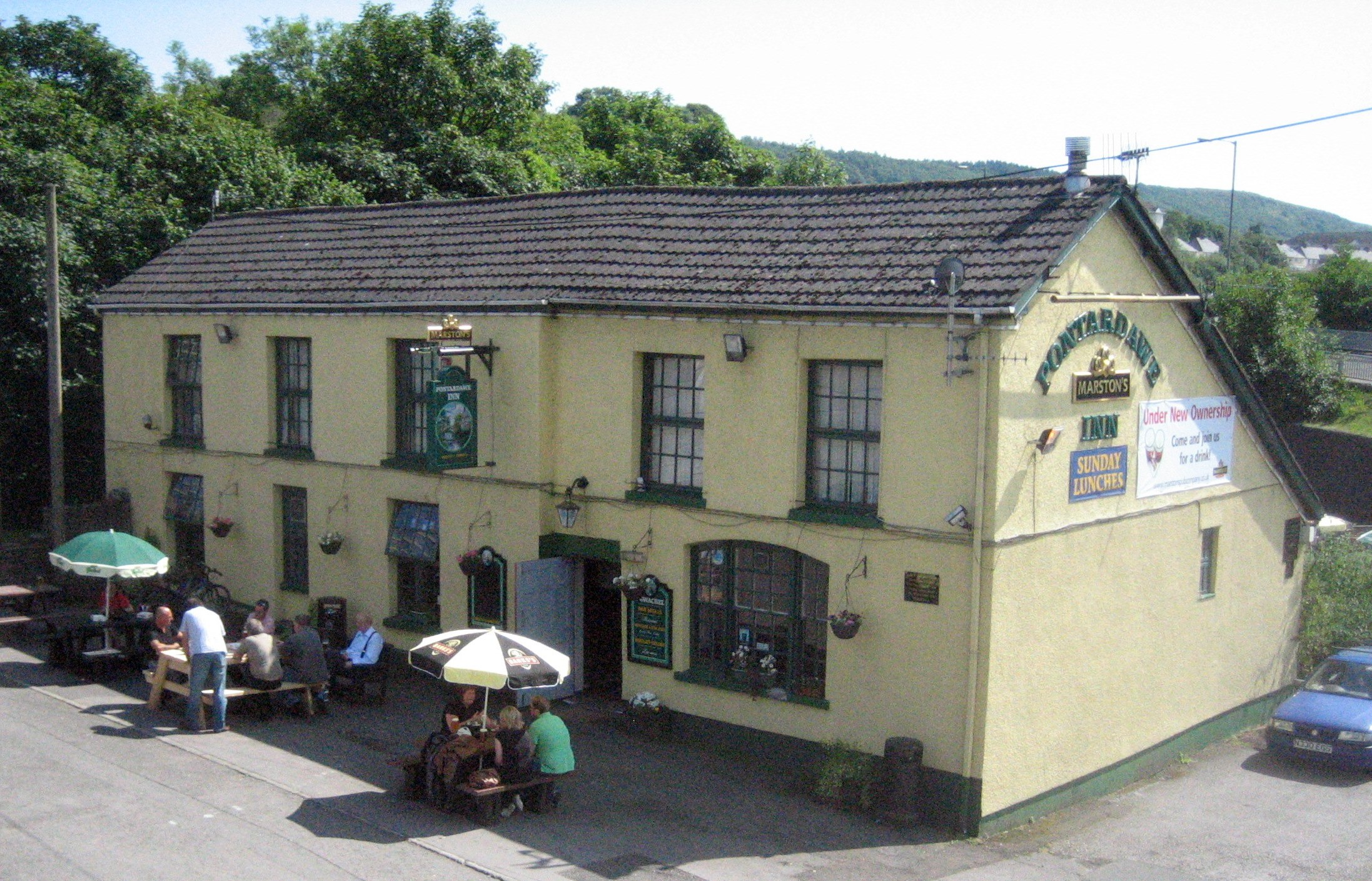
The Pontardawe Inn, known locally as the Gwachel

The Pontardawe Arts Centre stages performances by musicians of both national and international fame.

Every August from 1978, Pontardawe hosted the Pontardawe Festival; held on a weekend on the leisure centre playing-fields at Parc Ynysderw. This event featured singing, dancing, and other artistic performances from all over the world. Several years of bad weather affected admissions and due to the withdrawal of arts funding, the festival has ceased.

== Retail ==
The first phase of a new retail park on Ffordd Parc Ynysderw, close to Cwmtawe Community School, opened in July 2008.

In 2008, the Pontardawe Chamber for Trade & Commerce was formed. The goal is to promote business and rekindle a sense of community in and around the area, which had been lost following the arrival of nearby superstores. Seasonal festivals are held in the town centre.

== Notable people ==
- Mary Hopkin (born 1950) folk singer
- D. Gwenallt Jones (1899–1968) poet, critic, and scholar
- Stan Barstow (1928-2011) novelist, lived latterly in Pontardawe
- Mike Jones (1941–2022) painter who lived and worked in Pontardawe
- Rosie Ribbons (born 1983) singer-songwriter
- Lloyd Woolf (born 1981) comedy actor and writer
- Lewy Williams (born 2002) professional darts player

== Sports and recreation ==
Pontardawe has a cricket team, a lawn bowls club, a rugby club – Pontardawe RFC – and a football club. The playing fields adjoining the Pontardawe Leisure Centre at Parc Ynysderw are one of the UK's 471 King George Fields established as a memorial to King George V. They were officially transferred to their present site in 2003 and occupy land which formerly belonged to the tinplate works but is now owned and maintained by the local authority. The Cwmtawe rugby sevens competition is held at Parc Ynysderw.

Pontardawe has an Air Cadets unit – 1358 (Pontardawe) Squadron – that is open to both boys and girls aged 12 (in Year 8) to 18. Activities include flying, gliding, adventure training, first aid, and The Duke of Edinburgh's Award.

Pontardawe has a successful karate and kickboxing team who are members of the Welsh Contact Karate Association.

There is also a Swim Wales swimming club (Swansea Valley SC / Clwb Nofio Cwmtawe).

On a hill overlooking the town is the local golf course.

== Education ==
=== Primary schools ===
- Godre'r-graig Primary School
- Llangiwg Primary School
- Rhydyfro Primary School
- Ysgol Gynradd Gymraeg Pontardawe
- Ysgol Gynradd Gymraeg Trebannws

=== Secondary schools ===
- Cwmtawe Community School is a purpose-built 11–16 English-medium comprehensive school serving Pontardawe and its surrounding areas.
- Additionally, the senior department of Ysgol Gymraeg Ystalyfera Bro Dur, an all-ages (3–18) comprehensive school, provides Welsh-medium secondary education to pupils from the upper Swansea Valley at its recently extended and modernised campus in Ystalyfera, four miles from Pontardawe.

=== Further education ===
- Coleg Pontardawe – a Learndirect centre forming part of Neath Port Talbot College – is located on the Alloy Industrial Estate near the town centre. It offers vocational training courses for workers at the local factories and businesses on the industrial estate as well as adult students from throughout Pontardawe and the surrounding areas.

== Twinning ==
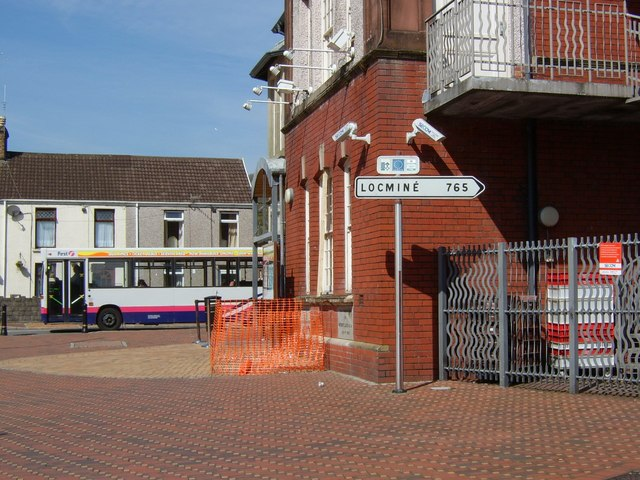
Signpost outside Pontardawe Arts Centre pointing to Locminé

Pontardawe is twinned with:

- Locminé, France

== See also ==
- Pontardawe Tinplate Works
