= Legacy (Mansun song) =

1998 single by Mansun

Single by Mansun

from the album Six
- B-side: "Can't Afford to Die"; "Spasm of Identity"; "Check Under the Bed"; "GSOH"; "Face in the Crowd"; "The Impending Collapse of It All" (acoustic); "Ski Jump Nose" (acoustic)
- Released: 29 June 1998
- Length: 6:29 (album version); 5:57 (radio edit); 4:41 (short radio edit)
- Label: Parlophone
- Songwriters: Paul Draper; Dominic Chad
- Producer: Paul Draper

Mansun singles chronology
"Closed for Business" (1997)	"Legacy" (1998)	"Being a Girl (Part One)" (1998)

"Legacy" is a song by English rock band Mansun. It was released as both a single and an extended play (EP) from the group's second album, Six, on 29 June 1998. "Legacy" follows a similar template to many of the group's other hits and was also their highest-charting single, peaking at No. 7 in the UK Singles Chart.

== Overview ==
"Legacy" was released as the first single from Mansun's second album, Six. It preceded the album by three months, but is somewhat unrepresentative of the overall sound of its parent album. It bears similarities with "Wide Open Space" and "Closed for Business"; two of the band's most popular singles. The song references the Marquis de Sade. The song's name was later used as the title for the group's retrospective compilation Legacy: The Best of Mansun in 2005. The closing refrain "Nobody cares when you're gone" was later reused as the title of a documentary about the group included on DVD editions of the Legacy: The Best of Mansun compilation.

The music video was directed by Mike Mills. After the controversial "Taxloss" video, it is probably their most unconventional and well known video. The video parodies the group and others like themselves, sending up the clichés of male pop and rock bands and the experience of the music industry. The entirety of the video is performed by simplistic and jerkily animated puppets against unconvincing but humorous cardboard backdrops.

== B-sides ==
The single was released in the final week of 1998 that allowed singles to have four tracks on each format. The new chart rules were instated the following week that meant that singles could only be eligible to chart with three tracks per format. The four-track EP was nostalgically valued by many musicians; this compromised the Mansun releases, which had offered value and incentives to fans by cramming numerous B-sides on each format. For example, "Legacy" provided a wealth or a plethora of content depending on a person's disposition by having five original B-sides, a remix, two versions of "Legacy" and two acoustic re-recordings across the single's four formats.

After the instatement of the new chart rules, ineligible four-track EPs were released as statements by musicians; the premise was to elevate the material as being a whole as opposed to a commercial pop hit. 3 Colours Red's EP Paralyse (1998) and Who the Fuck Are Arctic Monkeys? (2006) by Arctic Monkeys are examples of the practice. The chart rules were revised in October 2007 allowing four-track releases under the 'Maxi' name.

== Track listings ==
UK EP CD1 (includes a free poster)
No.	Title	Writer(s)	Length
1.	"Legacy" (extended version)	Paul Draper	6:29
2.	"Can't Afford to Die"	Draper, Dominic Chad	2:49
3.	"Spasm of Identity"	Draper, Chad	3:03
4.	"Check Under the Bed"	Draper, Chad	4:09

UK EP CD2
No.	Title	Writer(s)	Length
1.	"Legacy"	Draper	5:57
2.	"Wide Open Space" (The Perfecto remix)	Draper	7:16
3.	"GSOH"	Draper, Chad	1:22
4.	"Face in the Crowd"	Chad	3:43

UK limited-edition 7-inch red vinyl EP
No.	Title	Writer(s)	Length
1.	"Legacy"	Draper	5:57
2.	"GSOH"	Draper, Chad	1:22
3.	"Can't Afford to Die"	Draper, Chad	2:49

UK EP cassette
No.	Title	Writer(s)	Length
1.	"Legacy" (extended version)	Draper	6:29
2.	"Wide Open Space" (The Perfecto remix)	Draper	7:16
3.	"The Impending Collapse of It All" (acoustic)	Draper, Chad	4:16
4.	"Ski Jump Nose" (acoustic)	Draper	2:30

Japanese EP
No.	Title	Writer(s)	Length
1.	"Legacy" (radio edit)	Draper	5:56
2.	"Can't Afford to Die"	Draper, Chad	2:48
3.	"Spasm of Identity"	Draper, Chad	3:02
4.	"Check Under the Bed"	Draper, Chad	4:09
5.	"GSOH"	Draper, Chad	1:22
6.	"Face in the Crowd"	Draper, Chad	3:43
7.	"Wide Open Space" (The Perfecto remix)	Draper	7:16
8.	"Legacy" (Bridge Master)	Draper	6:26

== Personnel ==
Mansun

- Dominic Chad – Guitar, Backing Vocals, Bass ("Spasm of Identity")
- Paul Draper – Vocals, Guitar
- Andie Rathbone – Drums
- Stove – Bass

Production

- Paul Draper – producer ("Legacy")
- Mark 'Spike' Stent – producer ("Legacy"), mixing ("Legacy", "Spasm of Identity", "Face in the Crowd"), recording ("Spasm of Identity", "Face in the Crowd")
- Mike Hunter – additional recording ("Legacy", "Face in the Crowd"), engineer ("Legacy"), recording ("Can't Afford to Die", "Check Under the Bed", "GSOH", "Wide Open Space (The Perfecto Remix)", "The Impending Collapse of It All (Acoustic)", "Ski Jump Nose (Acoustic)")
- Ian Grimble – mixing ("Can't Afford to Die", "Check Under the Bed", "GSOH", "The Impending Collapse of It All (Acoustic)", "Ski Jump Nose (Acoustic)")
- Ian Caple – recording ("Wide Open Space (The Perfecto Remix)")
- Paul Oakenfold and Steve Osborne – additional production and remix ("Wide Open Space (The Perfecto Remix)")
- Danton Supple – remix engineer ("Wide Open Space (The Perfecto Remix)")
- Alex Sava – remix programmer ("Wide Open Space (The Perfecto Remix)")
- Pennie Smith – photography

== Charts ==
Chart (1998)	Peak position
Europe (Eurochart Hot 100)	30
Scotland Singles (OCC)	8
UK Singles (OCC)	7

== Release history ==
Region	Date	Format(s)	Label(s)	Ref.
United Kingdom	29 June 1998	CD; cassette	Parlophone	
United Kingdom	6 July 1998	7-inch vinyl	Parlophone	
Japan	7 August 1998	CD	Parlophone; EMI	
