= Cwmtawe Community School =

Coordinates: 51°42′57″N 3°51′13″W

- Ysgol Gymunedol Cwmtawe

Location
- Parc Ynysderw; Pontardawe, Neath Port Talbot; Wales

Information
- Type: Comprehensive School
- Motto: "We can and we will succeed by working together and giving of our best"
- Established: 1969 (Moved to new building 1996)
- Head teacher: Lee Hitchings
- Staff: 85 teaching, 73 support staff
- Gender: Coeducational
- Age: 11 to 16
- Enrolment: 1,283
- Language: English
- Colours: Royal Blue and Gold
- Website: http://www.cwmtawe.org

Cwmtawe Community School (in Welsh: Ysgol Gymunedol Cwmtawe) Formerly known as Pontardawe Technical School and Cwmtawe Comprehensive School, is a modern English-medium education comprehensive school in Pontardawe, South Wales.

The school moved to newly built premises in 1996. Its old building was used by the local Welsh-language primary school, Ysgol Gynradd Gymraeg Pontardawe (YGGP), until it was demolished in 2010. Cwmtawe recently won an award for environmentally friendly schools, based on school improvements, community and curriculum links, saving money, and raising environmental awareness. Although Cwmtawe is not a Welsh-medium school, Welsh is taught at second-language level, as it is mandatory under the National Curriculum that all Welsh school children up to age 16 be taught the language.

Cwmtawe has very good Key Stage 3 and GCSE results exceeding the targets set in Wales's national standards. In 2000, it was in 113th place in Wales for GCSE passes (based on 5 GCSEs, grades A*-C). Since then, examination results have improved dramatically; according to the latest inspection report by Estyn, the school has a GCSE pass rate of 73%, putting it in 12th place and within the top 10% of all schools in Wales.

== Feeder primary schools ==
The feeder primary schools for Cwmtawe are:

- Alltwen Primary School
- Godre'r Graig Primary School
- Llangiwg Primary School
- Rhos Primary School
- Rhydyfro Primary School
- Tairgwaith Primary School

== Notable former pupils ==
- Bleddyn Bowen, rugby union player
- Aled Brew, rugby union player
- Loren Dykes, football player
- Gareth Edwards, rugby union player
- James Griffiths, rugby union player
- Robert Jones, rugby union player
- Clive Lewis, Court of Appeal Judge
- Elgan Rees, rugby union player
- Arwel Thomas, rugby union player
- Justin Tipuric, rugby union player
- Lewy Williams, professional darts player
- Joe Hawkins, rugby union player
