= Being a Girl =

"Being a Girl (Part One) (Nine EP)"

Single by Mansun

from the album Six
- Released: 24 August 1998
- Recorded: 1998
- Genre: Progressive rock, alternative rock, experimental rock
- Length: 8:00; 2:00 (Part One)
- Label: Parlophone; Toshiba EMI (Japan)
- Songwriter: Paul Draper
- Producers: Paul Draper, Mark 'Spike' Stent

Mansun singles chronology
| "Legacy" (1998) | "Being a Girl (Part One) (Nine EP)" (1998) | "Negative" (1998) |

"Being a Girl" is a song by the English alternative rock band Mansun. It was released as a single on 24 August 1998, as the second single from the band's second studio album Six. The song was written by bandleader Paul Draper and produced by Draper with Mark 'Spike' Stent, with additional production by Mike Hunter during the Six sessions.

The song reached number 13 on the UK singles chart, becoming Mansun's seventh-consecutive top-20 hit.

== Background ==
The single version of "Being a Girl" is titled "Being a Girl (Part One)", and features just the first two minutes of the album's version. It was also released on an EP named the Nine EP. Draper described "Part One" of the song as new wave and punky. He said the full song was an "odd, long-winded digressive piece of music with something about communism and hating who you are and where you are, and Marxism and whatever baloney I was reading at the time."

The song was recorded in London's Olympic Studios, which Draper noted was previously used by Led Zeppelin. Drummer Andie Rathbone's kit was placed in a small kitchen in order to capture a "dry" drum sound.

== Reception ==
Melody Maker compared Part One of "Being a Girl" to Magazine and the Police, "reconstructed well enough – with its sudden bursts of guitar and stop-start arrangement – to sound bright and Nineties." In contrast to lead single "Legacy", which he felt gained better context in the album, "Being a Girl" was a "succinct battering-ram of a single."

== Track listing ==
All tracks are written by Paul Draper; except where indicated.

UK CD One/Japan CD
| No. | Title | Writer(s) | Length |
|---|---|---|---|
| 1. | "Being a Girl (Part One)" | | 2:00 |
| 2. | "Hideout" | Paul Draper, Dominic Chad, Stove King | 2:42 |
| 3. | "Railings" | Howard Devoto | 5:51 |

UK CD Two
| No. | Title | Writer(s) | Length |
|---|---|---|---|
| 1. | "Being a Girl (Part One)" | | 2:00 |
| 2. | "I Care" | Paul Draper, Dominic Chad | 3:42 |
| 3. | "Been Here Before" | | 4:09 |

UK Cassette
| No. | Title | Length |
|---|---|---|
| 1. | "Being a Girl (Part One)" | 2:00 |
| 2. | "Wide Open Space (Trouser Enthusiast Mix)" | 8:48 |
| 3. | "Mansun's Only Acoustic Song" |

7" Promo
| No. | Title | Length |
|---|---|---|
| 1. | "Being a Girl (Part One)" | 2:00 |

== Personnel ==
Mansun

- Dominic Chad – lead guitar, backing vocals
- Paul Draper – lead vocals, rhythm guitar
- Andie Rathbone – drums
- Stove – bass
- Howard Devoto – vocals ("Railings")

Production

- Paul Draper and Mark 'Spike' Stent – producer
- Mike Hunter – engineer, additional production
- Paul Walton – engineer
- Jan Kybeert – Pro Tools
- Pete Nevin – illustration

== Chart positions ==
| Chart (1998) | Peak position |
|---|---|
| UK Singles Chart | 13 |
| Scottish Singles Chart | 14 |
