= Pontardawe Festival =

Pontardawe Festival logo

Pontardawe Festival is an annual festival of world music and dance which is held every August on the playing fields in Pontardawe, Wales, UK.

The festival is run by volunteers on a not-for-profit basis and has been held every year with one exception since it first started in 1978.

It has received funding in the past from the Arts Council of Wales, but in 2006 the council decided to reduce funding to the festival and ask it to apply for lottery funding instead.

Pontardawe got lottery funding in 2006
