= Arfon Haines Davies =

Welsh television broadcaster

Arfon Haines Davies (born 1948) is a Welsh television presenter who began his career as a continuity announcer for HTV Wales (now part of ITV Cymru Wales) during the 1970s and 1980s.

Haines-Davies comes from Aberystwyth and studied drama in London. He began work as an announcer for HTV Wales in 1975 while still at college, after his sister had seen an advert in a Welsh language magazine and encouraged him to apply. He continued in this role for the next 18 years, additionally presenting a variety of television shows in English and Welsh. Continuity announcers appeared on screen during his period in the role, hence Haines Davies was one of ITV's most familiar faces. He is still presenting programmes, notably with the ITV series Never To Be Forgotten in 2008.

Haines-Davies was one of the people honoured by the Gorsedd of Bards at the 2014 National Eisteddfod of Wales for his contribution to Welsh language and culture.
